= List of South African admirals =

The following is an incomplete list of people who have attained admiral rank within the South African Navy (SAN).

== Key ==
| Abbreviation | Rank |
|---|---|
| Cdre | Commodore |
| R Adm (JG) | Rear Admiral (Junior Grade) |
| R Adm | Rear Admiral |
| V Adm | Vice Admiral |
| Adm | Admiral |

The ranks of Flag Officers changed on 1 Apr 1998 when the rank previously called Commodore became known as Rear Admiral (Junior Grade). For the purposes of this list if they held the rank of Commodore before 1998 they are listed with that rank.

== List ==
| Rank | Name | Last position held | Notes | Dates of service |
|---|---|---|---|---|
| Adm | Hugo Biermann | Chief of the Defence Force | Only person to hold the rank of admiral | 1952–1976 |
| V Adm | James Johnson | Chief of the Navy | Nickname "Flam" | |
| V Adm | Johan Charl Walters | Chief of the Navy | Nickname "Fido" | |
| V Adm | Ronald A Edwards | Chief of the Navy | Nickname "Ronnie" | |
| V Adm | Andries P Putter | Chief of the Navy | Nickname "Dries" | |
| V Adm | Glen Syndercombe | Chief of the Navy | | |
| V Adm | Lambert Jackson Woodburne | Chief of the Navy | Nickname "Woody" | |
| V Adm | Robert Simpson-Anderson | Chief of the Navy | | |
| V Adm | Johan Retief | Chief of the Navy | | |
| V Adm | Refiloe Johannes Mudimu | Chief of the Navy | | |
| V Adm | Samuel Hlongwane | Chief of the Navy | Nickname "Zeph" | |
| V Adm | Monde Lobese | Chief of the Navy | | |
| V Adm | Marthinus Bekker | Chief of Defence Force Staff | Nickname "Bert" | |
| V Adm | Martyn Trainor | Chief of Corporate Staff | Nickname "Spook" | |
| V Adm | Paul Murray | Chief of Staff Finance | | |
| V Adm | Piet Loedolff | Chief of Staff Personnel | Now an author and lecturer | |
| V Adm | Aart Malherbe | Chief of Staff Logistics | | |
| V Adm | Asiel Kubu | Chief of Human Resources | | |
| V Adm | David Mkhonto | Chief of Staff Logistics, SANDF | | |
| R Adm | Chris Bennett | Chief of Naval Staff | | |
| R Adm | Henry Edelbert Fougstedt | Chief of Naval Staff | | |
| R Adm | Robert W. Higgs | Chief of Naval Staff | Nickname "Rusty" | |
| R Adm | M.R. Terry-Lloyd | Chief of Naval Staff | | |
| R Adm | Bubele Mhlana | Chief of Staff-Joint Operations Division, Flag Officer Fleet | Nickname "Bravo" | |
| R Adm | Derek Christian | Deputy Chief Joint Operations | | |
| R Adm | Hanno Teuteberg | Deputy Chief of the Navy | | |
| R Adm | Guy Jamieson | Deputy Chief of the Navy | | |
| R Adm | Douglas Faure | Director Maritime Warfare, Deputy Chief of the Navy | | |
| R Adm | Gladys Mbulaheni | Chief of Naval Staff | First woman appointed full Rear Admiral | |
| R Adm | Phillip Schoultz | Flag Officer Fleet | | |
| R Adm | Dave Forsyth | Director Navy Reserves | | |
| R Adm | Peter Tomlinson | FOC Fleet Operations | | |
| R Adm | Bernhard Teuteberg | Chief Director Maritime Strategy | | |
| R Adm | H.P. Botha | Commandant Defence College; Deputy Chief of Staff Personnel | | - |
| R Adm | George Noel Green | Chief of Naval Staff Logistics | | |
| R Adm | Eric Green | Flag Officer Fleet | Brother of Alan Green | |
| R Adm | Alan Green | Chief Military Policy, Strategy Planning | Brother of Eric Green | |
| R Adm | Hennie Bester | Flag Officer Fleet | | |
| R Adm | Musawenkosi Nkomonde | Flag Officer Fleet, Inspector General of the Navy, Chief Director Maritime Strategy | Nickname "Kop" | |
| R Adm | Sagaren Pillay | Chief Director Maritime Strategy | Nickname "Sarge" | |
| R Adm | Paul Wijnberg | FOC Naval Command East | | |
| R Adm | Mosoeu Magalefa | Chief of Naval Staff | | |
| R Adm | George Mphafi | Chief Director Operational Development, Joint Operations Division | | |
| R Adm | Rolf Hauter | Chief Director Maritime Strategy, Chief Director Strategy and Planning SANDF | | |
| R Adm | Anthony Howell | Chief Director Maritime Warfare | Nickname "Chubby" | |
| R Adm | Alan Mandy | Chief Director Logistic Planning, Log Division | | |
| R Adm | Erhard Martin Kramer | Deputy Chief of Staff, SADF | | |
| R Adm | Raymond Eberlein | Chief Director Manpower Provisioning and Development, SADF; Chief of Naval Staff Personnel | | |
| R Adm | Evert Groenewald | Chief of Naval Staff Intelligence, Chief of Naval Operations | Nickname "Gringo" | |
| R Adm | Jaap Weideman | Navy Inspector General | | |
| R Adm | Johannes Richard Nortier | Chief of Naval Staff Logistics | Nickname "Dick" | |
| R Adm | James Sleigh | Chief of Naval Staff | | |
| R Adm | Barend Visser | Chief Director Logistic Systems, SANDF | | |
| R Adm | Paul Viljoen | FOC Navcom East, Chief of Naval Operations | Nickname Flip | 1989–1992 |
| R Adm | Stephanus Biermann | Chief of Staff, Training and Manning | Nickname "Chips"; Brother of Hugo Biermann | |
| R Adm | Anthony Morris | Chief Director Defence Acquisition Management, Materiél Division | Nickname "Muggies" | |
| R Adm | Dunstan Smart | Chief of Military Legal Services | | |
| R Adm | Izak G. Bothma | on the staff of CSP 1986 | | |
| R Adm | James Matshimane | Director Naval Personnel, CD HR Strategic Direction & Plan Chief Military Policy and Planning | | |
| R Adm | Servaas Verster | Chief Director Acquisition; Director Weapon Systems | Nickname "Kek" | |
| R Adm | Willem du Plessis | Defence Advisor to Washington DC; Deputy Chief of Staff Intelligence; National Intelligence Service | | |
| R Adm | Handsome Thamsanqa Matasane | Flag Officer Fleet, Director Maritime Warfare | | |
| R Adm (JG) | Thomas F. Shenfield | Chief of Naval Staff Finance | | |
| R Adm (JG) | Ivan Visée | Chief of Naval Staff Reserves | | |
| R Adm (JG) | Theo Butler | Director Naval Logistics c. 2001 | | |
| R Adm (JG) | Ockert van der Schyf | Director Naval Acquisition, Acquisition & Procurement Division | Nickname "Ockie" | |
| R Adm (JG) | Digby Thomson | Director Maritime Warfare | | |
| R Adm (JG) | Neville Howell | FOC Naval Base Durban | | |
| R Adm (JG) | Kwaedi Mabula | IG SA Navy | | |
| R Adm (JG) | Khanyisile Litchfield-Tshabalala | Director Fleet Human Resources, Fleet Command | First woman admiral | |
| R Adm (JG) | Loyiso Metu | Director Fleet Human Resources | died 2021 | |
| R Adm (JG) | William Joubert | Director Naval Planning | | |
| R Adm (JG) | Ralph Ndabambi | Director Naval Reserves | | |
| R Adm (JG) | Duncan Forrest | Director Naval Policy and Doctrine | | |
| R Adm (JG) | Jan Rabe | Director Fleet Force Preparation | | |
| R Adm (JG) | Frank Peché | | | |
| R Adm (JG) | Edward Ratala | Inspector General (Navy) | | |
| R Adm (JG) | Koos Louw | FOC Naval Base Simon's Town | | |
| R Adm (JG) | Arne Söderlund | Director Fleet Force Preparation | Nickname "Angel" | |
| R Adm (JG) | Solomon Peterson | Director Fleet Force Preparation | Nickname "Solly" | |
| R Adm (JG) | Gert Engelbrecht | Director Performance Audit IG DoD | | |
| R Adm (JG) | Karl Wiesner | Director Maritime Warfare | | |
| R Adm (JG) | Rendani Masutha | Defense Legal Services | | |
| R Adm (JG) | John George Barker | Inspector General Navy; Defence Attaché in France | | |
| R Adm (JG) | Cobus Visser | Director Technology Development, Defence Materiél Division | | |
| R Adm (JG) | Derek Dewey | Director Technology Development, Defence Materiél Division | | |
| R Adm (JG) | Leon Reeders | Director Naval Acquisitions, Defence Materiél Division | | |
| R Adm (JG) | Andre F. Steyn | DFS, Defence Secretariat | 1998 | |
| R Adm (JG) | Laura Jansen van Vuuren | Commandant Defence College | 2nd woman admiral | |
| R Adm (JG) | Patrick Duze | Director Force Preparation and Joint Operations, Joint Operations Division | Nickname "Lucky" | |
| R Adm (JG) | Monica Josias | Director Maritime Diplomacy and Strategy | | |
| R Adm (JG) | Kasaval Naidoo | Director Maritime Plans, Dir HR Formation Staff Acting General Officer Commanding Training Command | | |
| R Adm (JG) | Emily Masanabo | Director Navy Transformation | | |
| R Adm (JG) | Kevin J. Watson | Director Naval Engineering Services | | |
| R Adm (JG) | Dirk Izak De Villiers | Director Military Strategy, Military Policy Strategy & Planning, Inspector General SA Navy, Director Special Projects | | |
| R Adm (JG) | Frederick Andrew Hans | Director Supply Services Support Management at DOD LSF, Director Naval Logistics | | |
| R Adm (JG) | Alan Claydon-Fink | Director Naval Acquisitions | | |
| R Adm (JG) | Joseph Dlamini | Director Maritime Plans and Strategy, | | |
| R Adm (JG) | Nomonde Gogi-Gumede | Director Maritime Intelligence | | |
| R Adm (JG) | Z Kani | Director Operational Law Support, Dir Mil Def Council | | |
| R Adm (JG) | Henry Morake | D HR Service Systems, HR Div | | |
| R Adm (JG) | Z Camagu | Director Supply Services Support Management, DOD Logistic Support Formation | | |
| R Adm (JG) | S Makhanya | Director HR Separation | | |
| R Adm (JG) | Mokgadi A. Maphoto | Provost-Marshal General | | |
| R Adm (JG) | Leslie Katerinic | Chief of Fleet Staff | | |
| R Adm (JG) | Ernest Penzhorn | Director Naval Reserves | | |
| R Adm (JG) | Joseph Sinovich | Director Capabilities, Joint Operations Division | Nickname "Joe" | |
| R Adm | T E Mhlonyane | Inspector General | | |
| R Adm (JG) | S Pedersen | Director Naval Acquisition | | |
| R Adm (JG) | SF du Toit | Commandant, SA National Defence College | | |
| R Adm (JG) | Jabulani Mbotho | FOC Naval Base Durban, Director Fleet Force Preparation | | |
| R Adm (JG) | Bhekinkosi Mvovo | Director Naval Engineering, Fleet Command | | |
| R Adm (JG) | Andre de Wet | Director Fleet Force Preparation | | |
| R Adm (JG) | Sikumbuzo Msikinya | FOC Naval Base Simons Town, Navy Inspector General | | |
| R Adm (JG) | Francois Du Toit | Director Maritime Warfare | | |
| R Adm (JG) | ILH Nzimande | Attache Brazil, Director Naval Transformation | | |
| R Adm (JG) | Lisa Hendricks | Chief of Fleet Staff | | |
| R Adm (JG) | Mfanelo Bongco | Dir Mil Intelligence | | |
| R Adm (JG) | Jonathan Kamerman | Director Naval Acquisition | Nickname "Jonny" | |
| R Adm (JG) | John Renolds | OC Naval Log Base | | |
| R Adm (JG) | Steven Stead | Chief of Naval Staff Operations | | |
| R Adm (JG) | Joseph Dlamini | Director Maritime Dip & StratFOC Simonstown | | |
| R Adm (JG) | Willem J.J. van Niekerk | Director Naval Personnel | | |
| R Adm (JG) | Andy Cole | Director ETD Systems Integrity, Chief Director Human Resources Development | | |
| R Adm (JG) | Joseph Ikaneng | Director Fleet Logistics, Fleet Command | Nickname "Papi" | |
| R Adm (JG) | Obed Mthethwa | Director Engineering System Support, Logistics Division | | |
| R Adm (JG) | E.D. Bower | Director Naval Reserves | | |
| R Adm (JG) | Caroline Kriel | | | |
| R Adm (JG) | Philiswa R. Mboyise | Dir Navy Transformation, Defence Advisor to Brazil | | |
| R Adm (JG) | X.T. Hokoma | Director Naval Personnel | | |
| R Adm (JG) | Bryan Donkin | Chief of Naval Staff Operations | | |
| R Adm (JG) | P Tshabalala | Senior Liaison officer | | |
| R Adm (JG) | Steve van H. du Toit | Chief of Naval Staff Personnel | | |
| R Adm (JG) | Pieter Potgieter | Commandant Military Academy; OC Naval Base Simonstown | | |
| R Adm (JG) | S I Nantsi | Director Electronic Collection, Intel Div | | |
| R Adm (JG) | Grace Nkosi | Director Procurement, Logistics Div | | |
| R Adm (JG) | Judy Rustin-Patrick | CoS Fleet Comd HQ | | |
| R Adm (JG) | Godfrey Masimala | Director Maritime Plans | | |
| Cdre | Albert Samuel Davis | Naval Officer in Command, Durban | Nickname "Sam" | |
| Cdre | Heinrich Nicolaus Schoeman | | Recipient of Taiwanese Order of Resplendent Banner in 1980 | |
| Cdre | Theo Honiball | Chief of Naval Staff Planning | | |
| Cdre | Lukas Bakkes | Director Naval Reserves | | |
| Cdre | Paul Dryden-Dymond | Commodore Superintendent Naval Dockyard Simonstown | (b. 26.07.1912) | |
| Cdre | Peter Fougstedt | Chief of Staff, NAVCOM East | | |
| Cdre | Brian Hegarty | Director Training & Manning, Navy HQ | | |
| Cdre | Willem Ehlers | Military Aide to Pres P.W. Botha | Nickname "Ters" | |
| Cdre | Willem Greyling van der Merwe | | | |
| Cdre | Nicolaas Smit | D Kaart (Afr), Chief of Staff Operations | Nickname "Nick" | |
| Cdre | Peter Erich Bitzker | Inspector General Navy | Nickname "Butch"; Naval Attaché to Berlin | |
| Cdre | James Dalgleish | Chief of the Navy | | |
| Cdre | Frederick Dean | Chief of the Navy | Nickname "Dizzy" | |
| Cdre | John Dart | | | |
| Cdre | Chris Botha | Commanded the SA base in France, later Chief of Naval Staff Finance | | |
| Cdre | Dieter Gerhardt | OC Naval Base Simon's Town | Convicted Soviet spy | |
| Cdre | B.J. Pienaar | Director Internal Audit, Military Inspectorate | 1975-1984 | |
| Cdre | Jean de Villiers | | | |
| Cdre | Gert Brits | Commander Naval Operations Command | | |
| Cdre | Bill Hogg | Deputy Chief of Staff Naval Operations; Commander Naval Operations Command | | |
| Cdre | Jacobus J. de Beer | Director at Chief of Staff Personnel | Nickname "Koos"; Alumni of the 6/79 joint staff course | |
| Cdre | J.J. Nieuwoudt | | Alumni of the 4/78 joint staff course | |
| Cdre | W.R. Joubert | | Alumni of the 6/79 joint staff course | |
| Cdre | Charles Sanderoff | | | |
| Cdre | Roy Kingon | Inspector General Navy | | |
| Cdre | John Fairbairn | Commodore Superintendent Naval Base Simon's Town | | |
| Cdre | John Ferris | COMNAVCAPE 1982 | | |
| Cdre | Andre Burgers | Chief of Naval Staff Intelligence | | |
| Cdre | Andrew Cecil McMurray | Director Naval Operations, Chief of Staff Operations | | |
| Cdre | Andre Rudman | Commander Naval Training Command | | |
| Cdre | Jeremy Mathers | Director Naval Technology | | |
| Cdre | Nic Vorster | Chief of Naval Staff Operations (now known as Director Maritime Warfare) | | |
| Cdre | Errol Massey-Hicks | Chief of Naval Staff Operations | | |
| Cdre | Johan Andries de Kock | | | |
| Cdre | Vic Holderness | Commander Naval Operations Command | | |
| Cdre | John T. Kleinschmidt | Commander Naval Logistic Command | | |
| Cdre | Trevor Beddy | COMNAVCAPE | | |
| Cdre | Norman Wise | Commander Naval Logistics Command | | |
| Cdre | H. Jooste | Director at Military Intelligence Division | | |
| Cdre | P.J.C. Brown | Director Naval Stores | Nickname "Tubby" | |
| Cdre | John C. Goosen | | | |
| Cdre | George Basson | Chief of Naval Staff Operations, Director Maritime Warfare | | |
| Cdre | Jacques de Vos | OC Naval Base Simonstown | | |
| Cdre | Niel Guy | Director Resources | | |
| Cdre | Hendrik F. Nel | Formerly Dean Military Academy | Nickname "Hennie" | |
| Cdre | H.C. Nel | OC Naval Dockyard Simonstown | c1990 | |
| Cdre | D.W. Robertson | | | |
| Cdre | Edward William Jupp | | Nickname "Ted" | |
| Cdre | Dennis K. Kinkhead-Weekes | Director Naval Operations | Nickname "Skonky", 28/4/1920-12/8/1997 | |
| Cdre | Peter Keene | Chief of Naval Staff Intelligence, FOC Naval Base Simonstown | | |

== See also ==
- List of South African military chiefs
