= James Johnson (South African Navy officer) =

South African naval officer (1918–1990)

Vice Admiral James 'Flam' Johnson SSA SM DSC
- Born: 10 February 1918; Benoni, Transvaal, Union of South Africa
- Died: 2 October 1990 (aged 72); South Africa
- Military career
- Branch: South African Navy
- Service years: 1946–1977
- Rank: Vice Admiral
- Nickname: Flam
- Commands: South African Navy; SAS President Pretorius
- Wars: World War II
- Awards: Star of South Africa SSAG Southern Cross Medal SM Queen Elizabeth II Coronation Medal Good Service Medal Union Medal Distinguished Service Cross (United Kingdom) DSC 1939–45 Star Africa Star Atlantic Star Burma Star War Medal 1939–1945

Vice-Admiral James 'Johnny' Johnson SSA SM DSC (10 February 1918 – 2 October 1990) was a former Chief of the South African Navy (1 April 1972 to 30 September 1977). He was nicknamed "Flam" after his wartime red beard - "Vlambaard" in Afrikaans.

== Early career ==
He trained at the General Botha Training college from 1933 to 1934 and joined the P&O after leaving General Botha.

He was commissioned in 1938 and joined HMS York in 1939. After his ship was sunk in Suda Bay, Crete, he joined HMS Jed, which took part in the Battle of the Atlantic from 1942 to 1943. During this time he was awarded the Distinguished Service Cross for Gallantry. He also served as commanding officer of HMS Verbena (K85) and HMS Rosebay (K286)

== SA Navy career ==
After the war he transferred to the South African Navy in 1946 as a lieutenant commander. He held various commands, including SAS Bloemfontein, SAS Transvaal, SAS Good Hope (F432) during March to May 1948 and the Navy Gymnasium. He commanded the Rothesay-class frigate SAS President Pretorius when she was delivered from Britain in 1964, in the rank of captain. He was promoted to commodore in 1966.

1969 he was promoted to flag rank and appointed Chief of Naval Staff.

He was appointed Chief of the South African Navy in 1972 and was the last chief to occupy Admiralty House before Naval Headquarters moved to Pretoria.

== Awards and decorations ==
=== Distinguished Service Cross ===
The citation in the London Gazette reads:

For outstanding courage, enterprise and devotion to duty in action with enemy submarines while serving in H.M.S. Jed
Lieutenant James Johnson, R.N.R. (Brekpan (sic), Transvaal)

=== List ===
- Star of South Africa (Gold) (SSAG)
- Southern Cross Medal (1952) (SM)
- Southern Cross Medal (1975) (SM)
- Queen Elizabeth II Coronation Medal (Great Britain)
- Good Service Medal (Gold (30 Years))
- Good Service Medal (Silver (20 Years))
- Union Medal (South Africa)
- Distinguished Service Cross (United Kingdom) (DSC) (Great Britain)
- 1939–45 Star (Great Britain)
- Africa Star (Great Britain)
- Atlantic Star (Great Britain)
- Burma Star (Great Britain)
- War Medal 1939–1945 (Great Britain)
- Grand Cross of Naval Merit of the Order of May (Argentina)

Military offices
Preceded by Hugo Biermann	Chief of the South African Navy; 1972–1977	Succeeded by J Charl Walters
Preceded by M.R. Terry-Lloyd	Chief of Naval Staff; 1969–1972	Unknown
Unknown	OC SAS Good Hope (F432); 1948–1948	Succeeded by Lt Cdr Paul Dryden-Dymond
