= George Noel Green =

South African Navy officer

Rear Admiral George Noel Green SM
- Born: 1 December 1921; Johannesburg
- Spouse: Fiona Margaret Green
- Military career
- Allegiance: South Africa
- Branch: South African Navy
- Service years: 1938–1981
- Rank: Rear Admiral
- Unit: SAS Transvaal
- Commands: Chief of Naval Staff Logistics; OC Simonstown Naval Dockyard
- Wars: Second World War
- Awards: Southern Cross Medal SM Good Service Medal Union Medal 1939–45 Star Africa Star Atlantic Star War Medal 1939–1945 Defence Medal (United Kingdom) Africa Service Medal (WWII)

Rear Admiral George Noel Green SM was a South African Navy officer who served as Chief of Naval Staff Logistics.

== Early life ==
He was born in Johannesburg, a son of a marine engineer who had a long association with life at sea.

== World War II ==
He joined the Royal Navy in 1938 as a Boy Seaman 2nd class and later attained the rank of petty officer. He was appointed as an officer in the Royal Navy on 1 January 1945 at the rank of sub lieutenant. Torpedo officer and Watchkeeping Officer on HMS Caesar. Torpedo Anti Submarine officer and Assistant Navigator on HMS Bellona. Officer of the Quarters and Forecastle officer on HMS Nigeria. He served on the battleship HMS Hood, later destroyed by gunfire from the German battleship Bismarck. During the assault on Tobruk, his tank landing craft was blown from under him.

== South African navy career ==
He transferred to the South African Navy on 1 May 1947 with the rank of lieutenant. OC SAS Transvaal in May 1947-August 1957. OC Naval College from 1964 to 1966. He was promoted to Naval captain on 1 July 1966. Senior Naval Staff Officer Maritime Headquarters at Silvermine in 1966–1969. OC SAS President Steyn, SAS President Kruger beginning in July 1966 – 1971. He was promoted to Commodore in 1972 and served as the Officer Commanding Simonstown Naval Dockyard. He was promoted to rear admiral and succeeded R Adm Fido Walters as CNS Logistics on 1 October 1977.

== Awards and decorations ==
- Southern Cross Medal (1952) (SM)
- Good Service Medal (Gold (30 Years))
- Good Service Medal (Silver (20 Years))
- Union Medal
- 1939–45 Star
- Africa Star
- Atlantic Star
- War Medal 1939–1945
- Defence Medal (United Kingdom)
- Africa Service Medal (WWII)

== See also ==
- List of South African admirals

Military offices
Preceded by R Adm Fido Walters	Chief of Naval Staff Logistics; 1977–1979	Unknown
Preceded by Cdre Peter Selk	OC Simonson' Town Naval Dockyard; 1972–197?	Unknown
Preceded by Cdr Chips Biermann	OC SA Naval College	Unknown
