= Johan Charl Walters =

South African admiral

Vice Admiral Johan Charl Walters SD SM MMM SAN (Rtd)
- Born: January 9, 1919; Moorreesburg, Cape Province, Union of South Africa
- Died: 9 February 1993 (aged 74); Parow, Cape Town, Cape Province, South Africa
- Relatives: 2nd wife Aletta Walters (née Latsky), 1st wife Phyllis Evelyn Shinns (née Shurrie)
- Military career
- Allegiance: South Africa
- Branch: South African Navy
- Service years: 1941–1980
- Rank: Vice Admiral
- Commands: Chief of the South African Navy
- Awards: Southern Cross Decoration SD Southern Cross Medal SM Military Merit Medal MMM Good Service Medal Union Medal 1939–45 Star Atlantic Star Pacific Star War Medal 1939–1945 Africa Service Medal (WWII)

Vice-Admiral Johan Charl Walters SD SM MMM SAN (Rtd) (1919–1993) was a former Chief of the South African Navy.

== Early life ==
He was born on 9 January 1919 in Moorreesburg, Cape Province, and was christened on 2 March 1919.

== Naval career ==
He was trained at the General Botha Training college from 1934 to 1935 and joined the Ellerman Hall Line after leaving General Botha.

He served in World War II on a number of ships:

- 1941 – 1941 - Sub Lt. HMSAS Oostewal
- 1941 – 1942 HMSAS Natalia in command as a Sub Lieutenant
- 1943 HMSAS Bluff
- 1944 Lt HMSAS Soetvlei
- 1944 – 1945 HMS Salvestor
- 1946 HMS Chaster, HMS Indefatigable, HMS Barcross, HMS Barbrake
- 1947 HMS Rockrose 1947 – 1954
- Lt Cdr HMSAS Pretoria
- 1955 HMS Scott, HMS Shackleton
- 1956 HMSAS Protea
- October 1957 to 1963 LCDR/CDR/CAPT HMSAS Natal (K10) He was promoted to Commander in December 1960.
- 1964 – 1974 Commodore and Hydrographer of the Navy
- 1975 – 1976 Rear Admiral Chief of Naval Staff Logistics
- 1 October 1977 – 30 January 1980 Vice Admiral Chief of Navy

== Awards and decorations ==
- Southern Cross Decoration (SD)
- Southern Cross Medal (1952) (SM)
- Military Merit Medal (MMM)
- Good Service Medal (Gold (30 Years))
- Good Service Medal (Silver (20 Years))
- Union Medal
- 1939–45 Star
- Atlantic Star
- Pacific Star
- War Medal 1939–1945
- Africa Service Medal (WWII)

Military offices
Preceded by James Johnson	Chief of the South African Navy; 1977–1980	Succeeded by Ronald A Edwards
Unknown	Chief of Naval Staff Logistics; 1975–1977	Succeeded by George Noel Green
