= QF 4-inch naval gun Mk XVI =

Standard British naval gun from WW2

Ordnance QF 4 inch gun Mk XVI
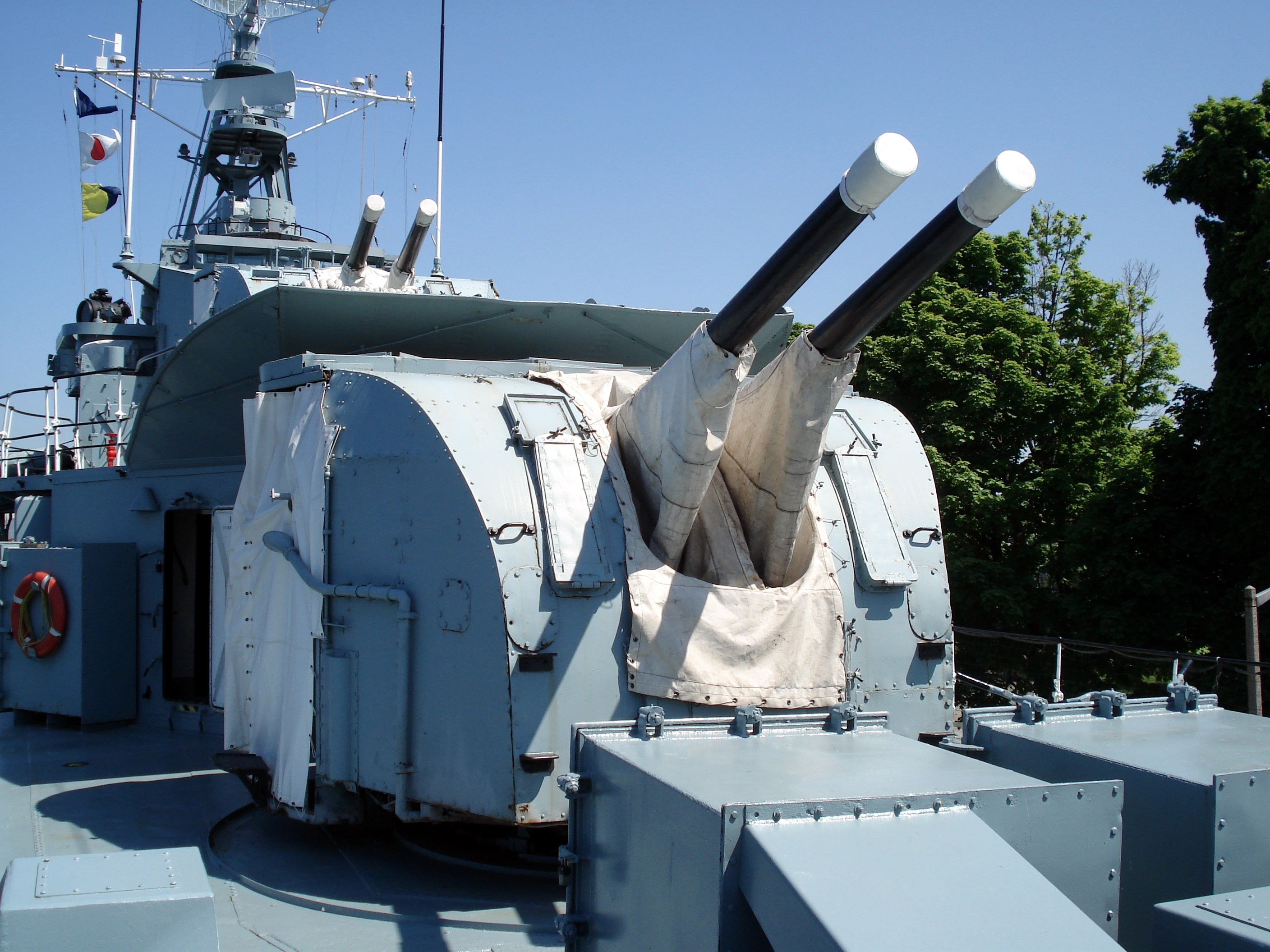
- Twin Mk XVI on HMCS Haida
- Type: Naval gun Naval anti-aircraft gun
- Place of origin: United Kingdom

Service history
- In service: 1936--1950s
- Used by: Royal Navy; Royal Canadian Navy; Royal Australian Navy; South African Navy; Royal Malaysian Navy
- Wars: World War II; Korean War; Suez Crisis

Production history
- No. built: 2,555
- Variants: Mk XVI* and Mk XXI

Specifications
- Mass: Barrel & breech 4,495 lb (2,039 kg)
- Barrel length: 180 inches (4,572 mm) (45 cal)
- Shell: Fixed QF 35 pounds (15.88 kg) HE; 38.25 pounds (17.35 kg) S.A.P.
- Calibre: 4-inch (101.6 mm)
- Breech: vertical sliding-block
- Recoil: hydro - pneumatic 831 millimetres (33 in)
- Elevation: mounting dependent (-10 to 80 deg on H.A. twin mark XIX mount)
- Traverse: mounting dependent
- Rate of fire: 15–20 rounds per minute
- Muzzle velocity: 2,660 feet per second (811 m/s)
- Maximum firing range: 19,850 yards (18,150 m) at 45 degrees elevation AA Range: 39,000 feet (11,890 m) at 80 degrees elevation
- Filling weight: 9 pounds (4.08 kg)

The QF 4 inch Mk XVI gun (Note: Mk XVI = Mark 16. Britain used Roman numerals to denote marks (models) of ordnance until after World War II. Mark XVI indicates this was the sixteenth model of QF 4 inch gun.) was the standard British Empire naval anti-aircraft and dual-purpose gun of World War II.

== Service ==
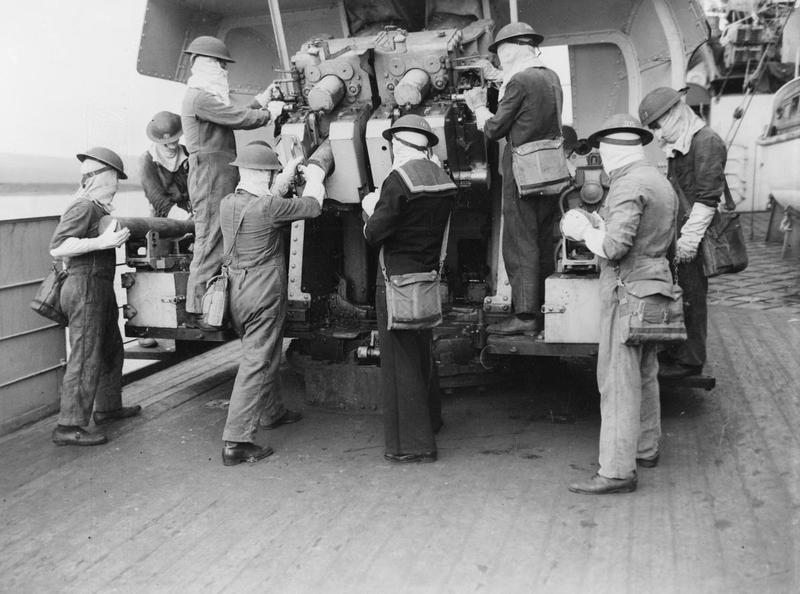
Crew of a dual 4-inch at action stations aboard HMS Berwick while in screening the Atlantic Convoys in May 1943.

The Mk XVI superseded the earlier QF 4 inch Mk V naval gun on many Royal Navy ships during the late 1930s and early 1940s. The ammunition fired by the Mk V gun and the Mk XVI guns were different. The ammunition for the Mk V gun was 44.3 inches (1.13 m) long and weighed 56 pounds (25 kg), while the ammunition fired by the Mk XVI gun was 42.1 inches (1.07 m) long and weighed 66.75 pounds (30.28 kg). The weight of the high-explosive projectile grew from 31 pounds (14 kg) for the Mk V to 35 pounds (16 kg) for the Mk XVI.

There were three variants of the gun produced with differing construction methods. The original Mk XVI had an A tube, jacket to 63.5 inches (1.61 m) from the muzzle and a removable breech ring. The Mk XVI* replaced the A tube with an autofretted loose barrel with a sealing collar at the front of the jacket. The Mk XXI was a lighter version with an autofretted monobloc barrel and a removable breech ring. The total number of Mk XVI and XVI* guns produced was 2,555, while there were 238 Mk XXI guns produced. Of those totals, 604 Mk XVI* and 135 of the Mk XXI guns were produced in Canada and 45 of the Mk XVI* were produced in Australia. These guns were usually mounted on HA/LA Mark XIX twin mountings, although several Australian frigates and corvettes had single-gun Mk XX mountings.

The last Royal Navy ship to operate with a Mark XIX twin mounting was HMS Mermaid (F76), which had originally been designed for the Ghana Navy and so required a simple and inexpensive main armament. Acquired by the British Government in 1972, she served until 1977 when she was purchased by the Royal Malaysian Navy and renamed KD Hang Tuah.

== List of equipped vessels ==
=== As secondary armament ===
(list not complete)

Aircraft carriers:

- HMS Furious
- HMS Unicorn

Escort carriers:

- Nairana class
- HMS Pretoria Castle
- HMS Activity

Battleships:

- Revenge class
- HMS Barham, HMS Malaya & HMS Warspite (post-refit)

Battlecruisers:

- HMS Hood

Heavy cruisers:

- County class
- HMS Exeter (post-refit)
- HMS Effingham (post-refit)

Light cruisers:

- C-class cruisers (converted to anti-aircraft cruisers)
- Minotaur class
- Arethusa class
- Leander class
- Town class
- Fiji class

Others:

- Roberts-class monitor

=== As main armament ===
(list not complete)

- Abdiel-class minelayers
- Tribal-class destroyers
- L and M-class destroyer (the first series L: HMS Gurkha, Lance, Legion, Lively)
- HMS Petard (modified)
- Weapon-class destroyers
- V and W-class destroyers (after WAIR modification – 15 ships)
- HMS Wallace (after WAIR modification)
- Hunt-class destroyers
- Some Bathurst-class corvettes (single-gun Mk XX mounting)
- Black Swan-class sloops
- Egret-class sloops
- Bittern-class sloop (modified)
- Grimsby-class sloop (modified)
- Bay-class frigates
- River-class frigates (part of Canadian-built)
- 8 auxiliary AA defence ships
- Some landing ships

=== Allied ships fitted out in Britain ===
- ORP Błyskawica (Polish)
- HNLMS Jacob van Heemskerck (Dutch)
- HNLMS Isaac Sweers (Dutch)
- 4 French Elan-class avisos and Chamois-class avisos

=== Post-war construction ships ===
- Type 15 frigates (converted)
- Type 16 frigates (converted)
- SAS Jan van Riebeeck and Simon van der Stel converted frigates (South Africa)
- NNS Nigeria frigate (Nigerian)
- Vosper Mk 3 corvettes (NNS Dorina and Otobo) (Nigerian)

The South African Navy Loch-class frigates (HMSAS Good Hope and HMSAS Transvaal) each had two of these guns mounted on a twin Mark XIX mount on their foredeck between 1955 and 1976.

== Ammunition ==
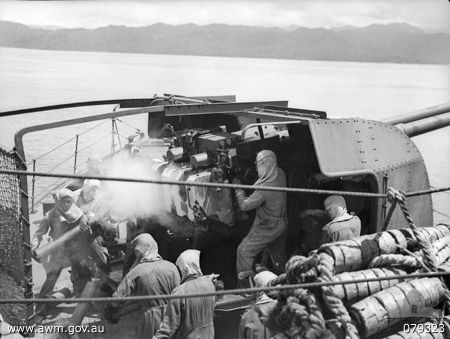
Twin guns of HMAS Swan bombarding shore positions in New Guinea, February 1945

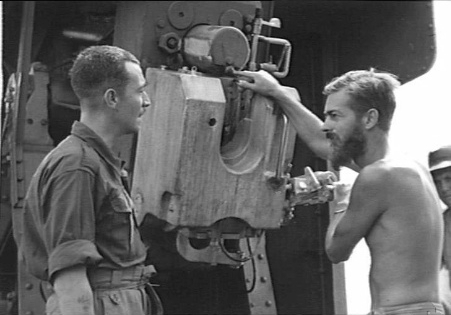
Single Mk XX mounting on HMAS Barcoo, 1945

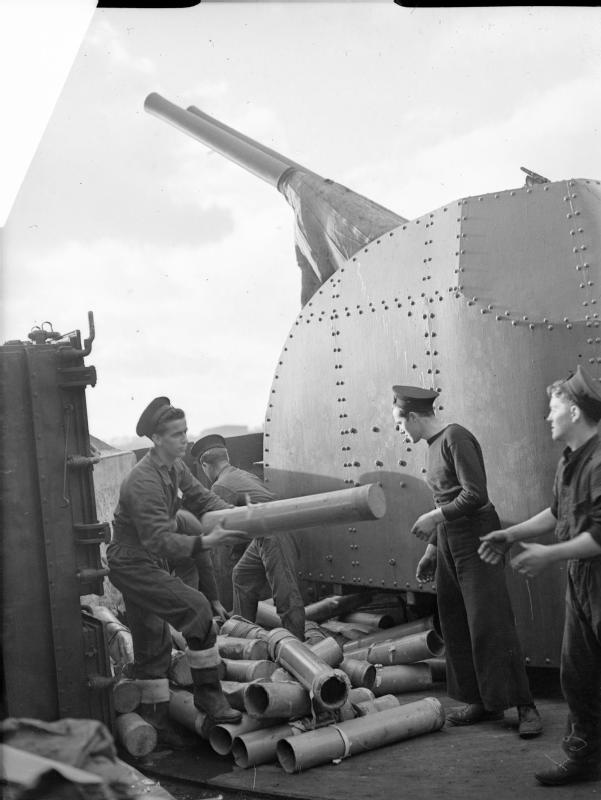
Gunners of HMS Glasgow clearing empty cartridges after a shoot

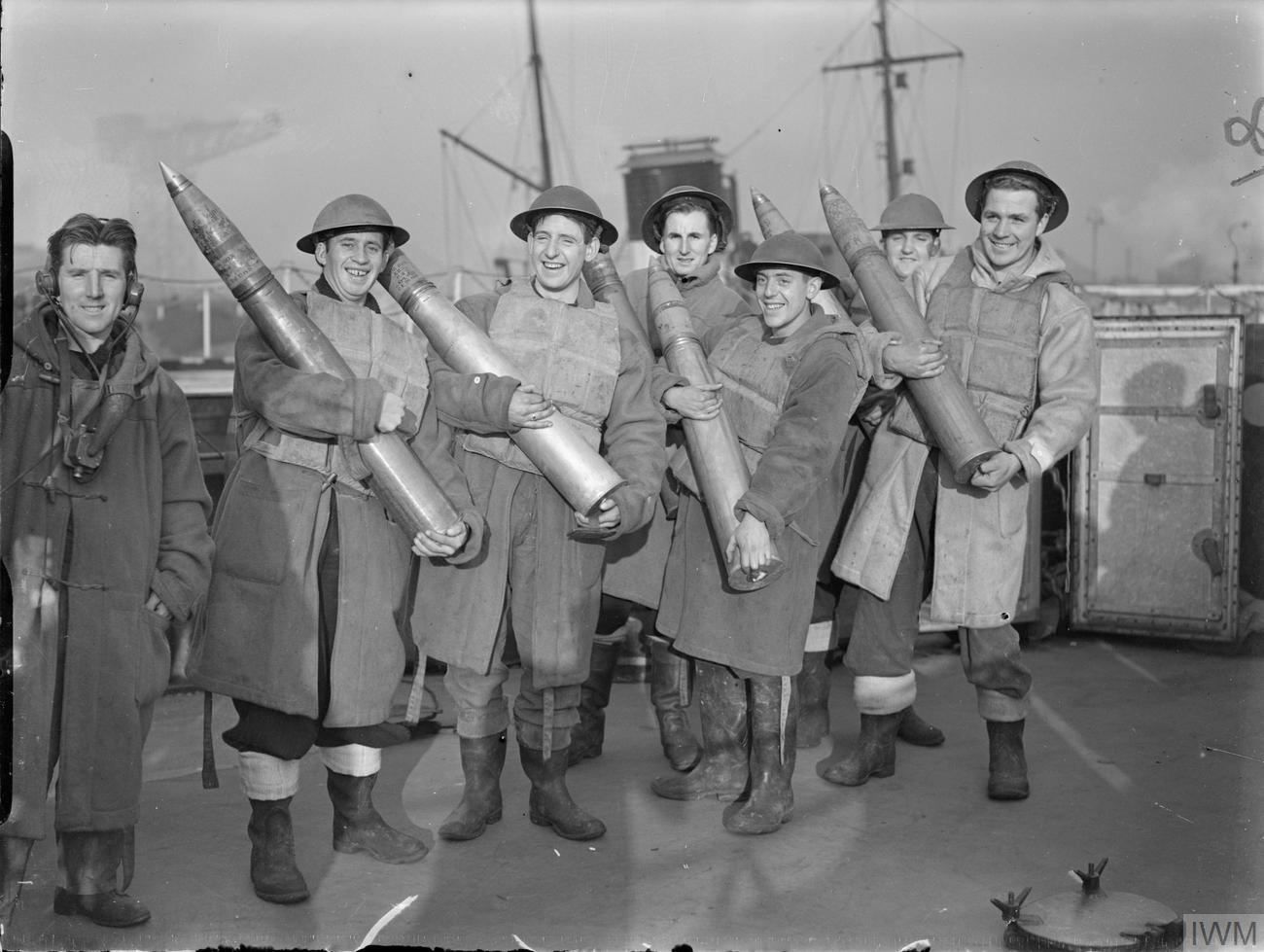
Gunners of V-class destroyer HMS Vivien displaying anti-aircraft rounds, 1940

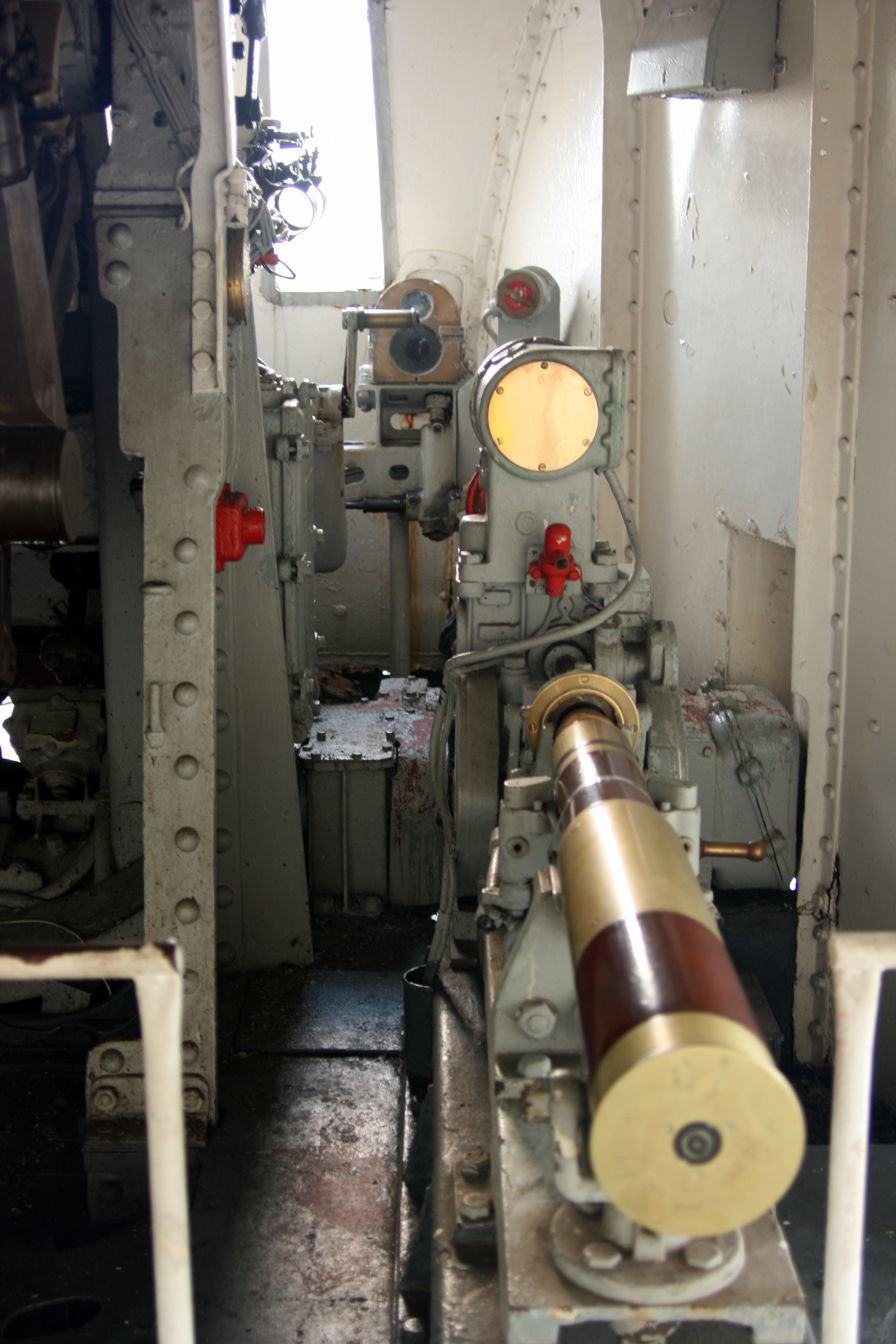
A round in a fuze setter on HMS Belfast

== See also ==
- QF 4 inch Mk V naval gun : Royal Navy anti-aircraft predecessor
- List of naval anti-aircraft guns
- List of naval guns

== Surviving examples ==
- Front Lawn of HMCS York, Toronto, Ontario, Canada
- On HMCS Haida, Hamilton, Ontario, Canada.
- A pair in turret from HMCS Huron (G24) at the Royal Military College, Kingston, Ontario, Canada
- Naval Museum of Alberta, Canada
- HMCS Unicorn, Saskatoon, Saskatchewan, Canada.
- Trenton Park, Trenton, Nova Scotia, Canada
- On HMS Belfast, London, which retains four twin guns.
- Explosion! Museum of Naval Firepower, Gosport, Hampshire, UK
- On ORP Błyskawica, Gdynia (re-bored to 100 mm).
- A pair at South African National Museum of Military History, Johannesburg
- A pair in a turret from INS Haifa (K-38), at Clandestine Immigration and Naval Museum, Haifa, Israel.
- Two single guns on HMAS Diamantina, Brisbane, Australia
- One twin gun at the Marinemuseet, Horten, Norway.
- One twin gun in the Aldhurst military vehicles collection, Surrey England. Further research has proven the left gun was installed on the heavy cruiser HMS Devonshire from 1943 until she was scrapped in 1954.

== Bibliography ==
- Campbell, John (1985). Naval Weapons of World War Two. Naval Institute Press. ISBN 0-87021-459-4.
- Gardiner, Robert; Chumbley, Stephen, eds. (1995). Conway's All The World's Fighting Ships 1947–1995. Annapolis, Maryland: Naval Institute Press. ISBN 1-55750-132-7.
