= M.R. Terry-Lloyd =

South African naval officer (1913–1978)

Rear Admiral Merddyn Ray Terry-Lloyd SSA SM
- Born: 29 July 1913; Queenstown, Eastern Cape, Cape Province, Union of South Africa
- Died: October 28, 1978 (aged 65); Pretoria, Transvaal, South Africa
- Military career
- Allegiance: South Africa
- Branch: South African Navy
- Rank: Rear Admiral
- Commands: SAS President Kruger (F150); HMSAS Vrystaat; HMSAS Simon van der Stel; HMSAS Natal; HMSAS Good Hope; HMSAS Southern Seas; HMSAS Southern Isles; HMSAS Mooivlei
- Awards

Rear Admiral Merddyn Ray Terry-Lloyd SSA SM (29 July 1913, Queenstown – 28 October 1978, Pretoria) was a South African naval officer.

== Early life ==
Terry-Lloyd attended Queen's College in Queenstown before moving to finish his schooling at St. Andrew's College, Grahamstown. After leaving school in 1930 he went to work at the Netherlands Bank in East London.

== Naval career ==
Terry-Lloyd had wanted to join the Royal Navy at the age of 12 as a cadet but his father forbade it. Still intent on joining the Navy he joined the South African Division of the Royal Naval Volunteer Reserve in 1931. He was commissioned as a Sub Lieutenant in 1934, and promoted to Lieutenant in 1938.

In 1940, Terry-Lloyd transferred to the Seaward Defence Force, the naval component of the South African Active Citizen Force and attended Anti Submarine courses before being given command of HMSAS Mooivlei. In 1942 he was stationed in the Mediterranean and commanded HMSAS Southern Isles and HMSAS Southern Seas. Terry-Lloyd was promoted Lieutenant Commander in 1943 and appointed Senior Officer Anti Submarine Flotillas in 1944, followed by a post as Staff Officer in Cape Town and General Staff Officer in Pretoria in 1945.

In 1946, Terry-Lloyd was appointed to the South African Permanent Force and sent to England on a Staff course followed by a stint as a liaison officer at the South African High Commission. On his arrival in South Africa he was given command of HMSAS Good Hope followed by command of HMSAS Loch Natal in November 1948. He served as Staff Officer in Pretoria from 1950 until January 1954 when he assumed command of HMSAS Simon van der Stel.

In August 1955, Terry-Lloyd was appointed Officer Commanding of the Naval base at Salisbury Island before being sent to England in 1956 to take command of the frigate HMSAS Vrystaat. On his promotion to Captain he was also appointed as Senior Officer Tenth Frigate Squadron – known as F10.

Terry-Lloyd was then sent to England to oversee the construction of the Type 12 frigates purchased under the Simonstown Agreement, also serving as the first captain of SAS President Kruger (F150). On the ships arrival in Simon's Town in 1963 he was promoted to Commodore.

On 1 February 1965, Terry-Lloyd was appointed to Headquarters as Director Operations, a position he held until 1 July 1966, when he was appointed Chief of Naval Staff in the rank of Rear Admiral

== Retirement and death ==
Terry-Lloyd’s final posting before his retirement in 1973 was as Armed Forces attache at the South African Embassy in London. Shortly before his retirement he was invested with the Star of South Africa

Terry-Lloyd died on 28 October 1978.

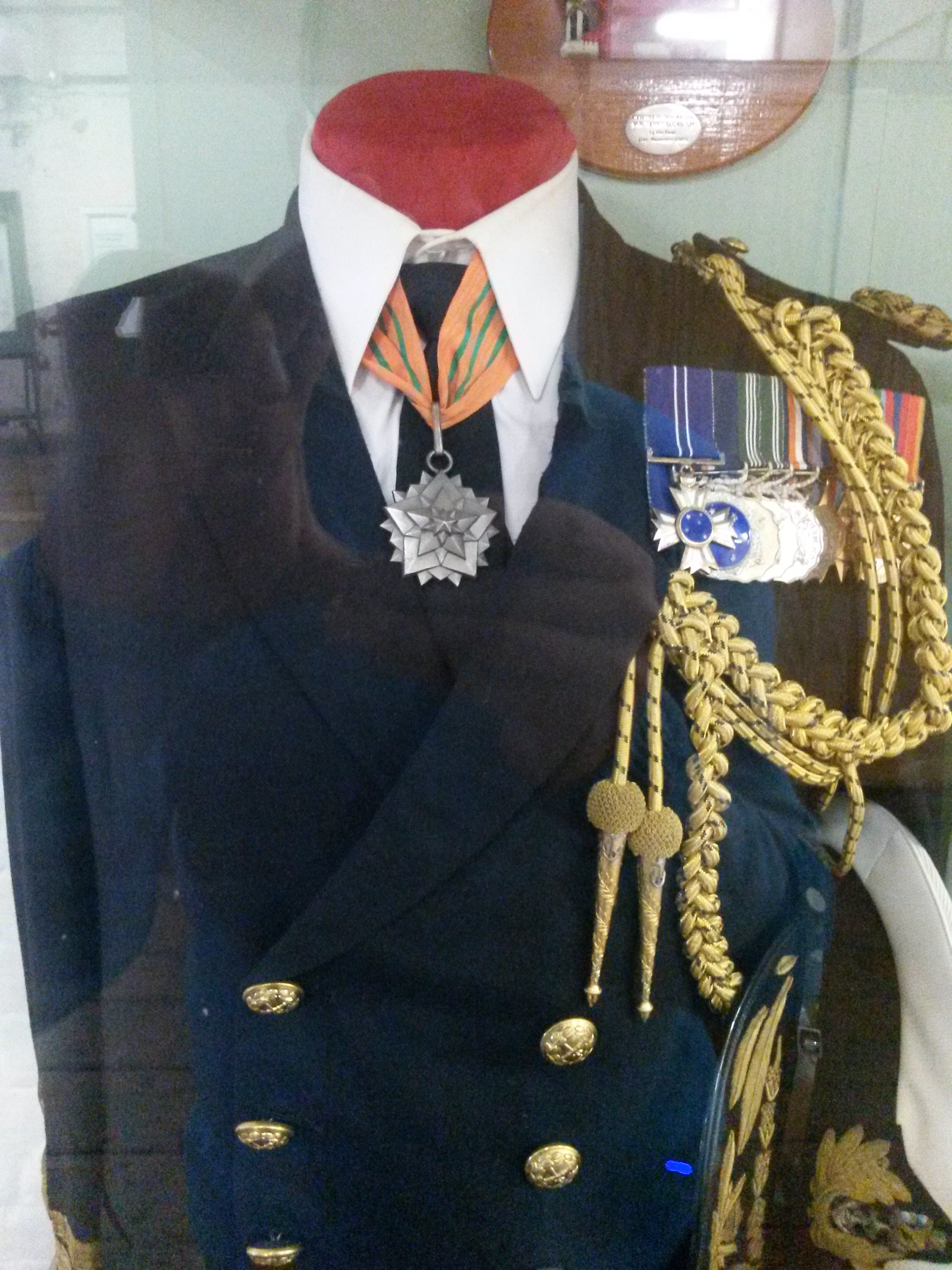
His uniform on display at the Naval Museum

== Awards and decorations ==
- Star of South Africa (1952) (SSA)
- Southern Cross Medal (1952) (SM)
- Union Medal
- 1939–45 Star
- Atlantic Star
- Africa Star
- War Medal 1939–1945
- Africa Service Medal (WWII)
