= HMS Vanguard (23) =

British Fast battleship

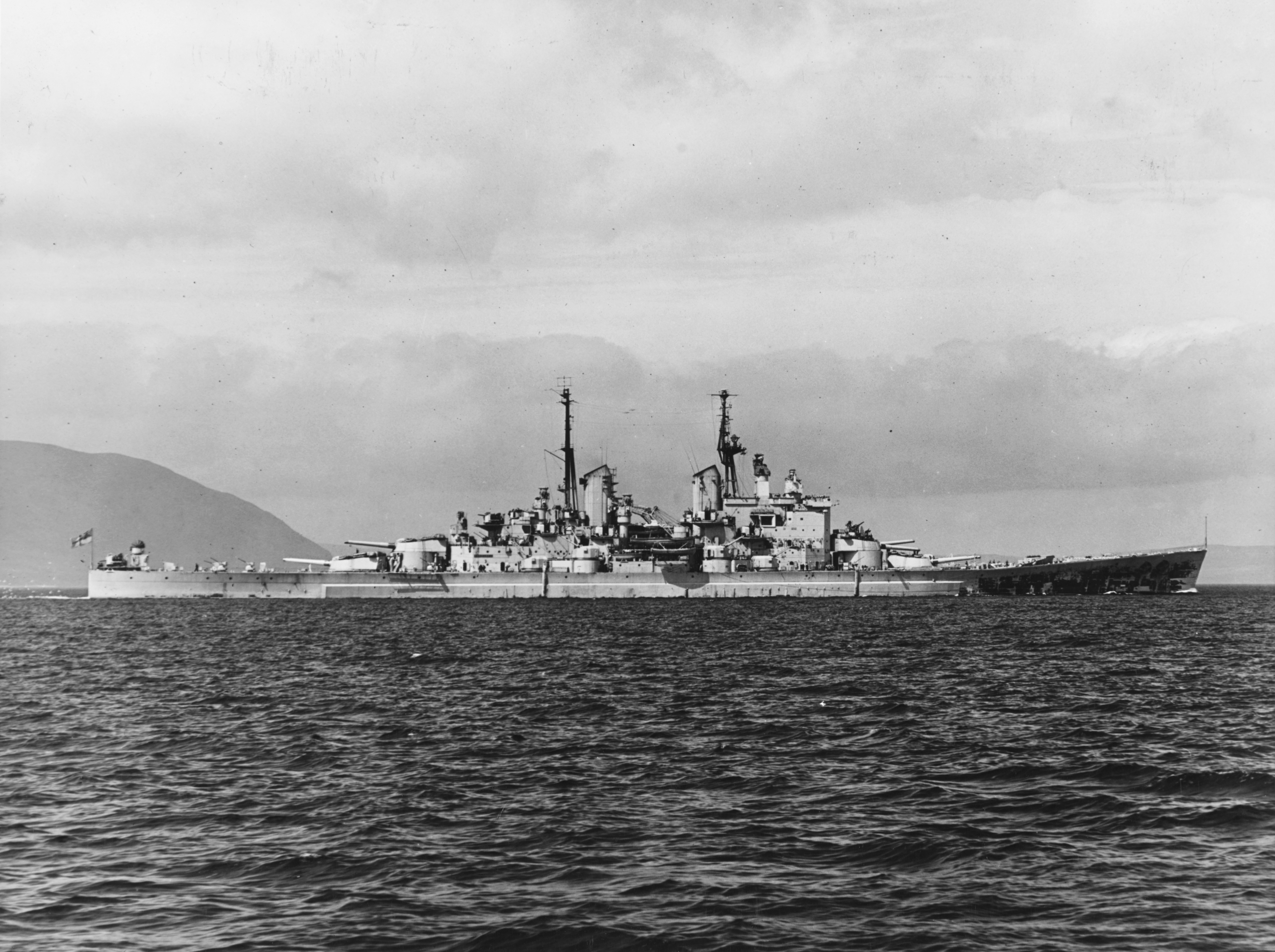
- Profile view of Vanguard underway

Class overview
- Operators: Royal Navy
- Preceded by: Lion class (planned); King George V class (actual)
- Succeeded by: None
- Built: 1941–1946
- In commission: 1946–1960
- Completed: 1
- Scrapped: 1

History

United Kingdom
- Name: Vanguard
- Ordered: 14 March 1941
- Builder: John Brown and Company, Clydebank, Scotland
- Cost: £11,530,503
- Yard number: 567
- Laid down: 2 October 1941
- Launched: 30 November 1944
- Commissioned: 12 May 1946
- Decommissioned: 7 June 1960
- Identification: Pennant number: 23
- Motto: We Lead
- Fate: Scrapped, 9 August 1960
- Badge: On a field blue, issuing from barry of four white and green a demi-lion gold supporting a spear issuing white

General characteristics (as completed)
- Type: Fast battleship
- Displacement: 44,500 long tons (45,200 t) (standard); 51,420 long tons (52,250 t) (deep load)
- Length: 814 ft 4 in (248.2 m) (o/a)
- Beam: 108 ft (32.9 m)
- Draught: 36 ft (11 m) (deep load)
- Installed power: 8 Admiralty 3-drum boilers; 130,000 shp (97,000 kW)
- Propulsion: 4 shafts; 4 steam turbine sets
- Speed: 30 knots (56 km/h; 35 mph)
- Range: 8,250 nautical miles (15,280 km; 9,490 mi) at 15 knots (28 km/h; 17 mph)
- Complement: 1,975
- Sensors & processing systems: 1 × Type 960 early-warning radar; 1 × Type 293 search radar; 1 × Type 277 height-finding radar; 2 × Type 274 15-inch fire-control radar; 4 × Type 275 5.25-inch fire-control radar; 11 × Type 262 40 mm fire-control radar
- Armament: 4 × twin 15 in (381 mm) guns; 8 × twin 5.25 in (133 mm) dual-purpose guns; 10 × sextuple, 1 × twin, 11 × single 40 mm (1.6 in) Bofors AA guns
- Armour: Belt: 4.5–14 in (114–356 mm); Deck: 2.5–6 in (64–152 mm); Barbettes: 11–13 in (279–330 mm); Gun turrets: 7–13 in (178–330 mm); Conning tower: 2–3 in (51–76 mm); Bulkheads: 4–12 in (102–305 mm)

HMS Vanguard was a British fast battleship built during the Second World War and commissioned after the war ended. She was the largest and fastest of the Royal Navy's battleships, and the only ship of her class. Vanguard was the last battleship in history to be built. (Note: The French battleship Jean Bart was laid down in 1936 and launched in 1940, but could not be finished during the Second World War and therefore entered service after Vanguard)

The Royal Navy anticipated being outnumbered by the combined German and Japanese battleships in the early 1940s, and had therefore started building the Lion-class battleships. However, the time-consuming construction of the triple-16-inch (406 mm) turrets for the Lion class would delay their completion until 1943 at the earliest. The British had enough 15-inch (381 mm) guns and turrets in storage to allow one ship of a modified Lion-class design with four twin-15-inch turrets to be completed faster than the Lion-class vessels that had already been laid down. Work on Vanguard was started and stopped several times during the war, and her design was revised several times during her construction to reflect war experience. These stoppages and changes prevented her from being completed before the end of the war.

Vanguard's first task after completing her sea trial at the end of 1946 was, early the next year, to convey King George VI and his family on the first Royal Tour of South Africa by a reigning monarch. While refitting after her return, she was selected for another Royal Tour of Australia and New Zealand in 1948. This was cancelled due to King George's declining health and Vanguard briefly became flagship of the Mediterranean Fleet in early 1949. After her return home in mid-1949, she became flagship of the Home Fleet Training Squadron. Throughout her career, the battleship usually served as the flagship of any unit to which she was assigned. During the early 1950s, Vanguard was involved in a number of training exercises with NATO forces. In 1953 she participated in Queen Elizabeth II's Coronation Review.

Through the mid-1950s she was kept active, along with four older battleships in reserve, largely as a counter to the Soviet Sverdlov-class cruiser fleet, which she easily outperformed. As the Blackburn Buccaneer attack aircraft entered service, the need for large-gun ships to counter the Sverdlovs ended since the Buccaneer could attack the Sverdlovs with relative ease. While Vanguard was refitting in 1955, the Admiralty announced that the ship was going to be put into reserve upon completion of the work. She was sold for scrap and was broken up beginning in 1960.

== Design and description ==
By early 1939 it was clear that the first two Lion-class battleships could not be delivered before 1943 at the earliest and that further battleship construction would be necessary to match the German and Japanese battleships already under construction. The main constraint on the construction of any new battleships was the limited available capacity and the time required to build large-calibre guns and their gun turrets. Using four existing twin 15-inch mountings offered the possibility of bypassing this bottleneck and allowed the construction of a single fast battleship more quickly than building more Lion-class ships. The turrets were originally built for the battlecruisers Courageous and Glorious during the First World War, and were removed during the conversions of these ships to aircraft carriers in the 1920s. To save time, the Lion design was modified to accommodate the four turrets, and preliminary design work began in July 1939. The square or transom stern was retained as it was estimated to improve speed at full power by 0.33 knots (0.61 km/h; 0.38 mph). This made Vanguard the only British battleship built with a transom stern, as the Lions were never finished.

Design work was suspended on 11 September 1939, after the start of the Second World War, but resumed in February 1940 after the First Lord of the Admiralty, Winston Churchill, expressed an interest in the ship. The design was modified to increase protection against shell splinters on the unprotected sides of the ship's hull, the armour of the secondary armament was increased to resist 500-pound (230 kg) semi-armour-piercing bombs, and the splinter belt's thickness fore and aft of the main armour belt was reduced by 0.5 inches (12.7 mm) in compensation. A small conning tower was added aft, and four Unrotated Projectile mounts were added to supplement the six octuple-barrel 2-pounder anti-aircraft mounts already planned.

More pressing commitments forced the preliminary design work to be suspended again in June; when it resumed in October the design was modified again in light of recent war experience. Greater fuel capacity was added and the armour protection improved, but these changes deepened the design's draught to beyond the 34-foot (10.4 m) limit of the Suez Canal. The thickness of the main belt was reduced by 1 inch (25 mm) to save weight, but the primary method chosen to reduce the draught was to increase the beam by 2.5 feet (0.76 m). This exceeded the width of the docks at Rosyth and Plymouth, which severely limited the number of docks that could handle the ship, but the changes were approved by the Board of Admiralty on 17 April 1941. The ship had already been ordered on 14 March under the 1940 Emergency War Programme, although the drawings were not turned over to John Brown & Company until ten days later.

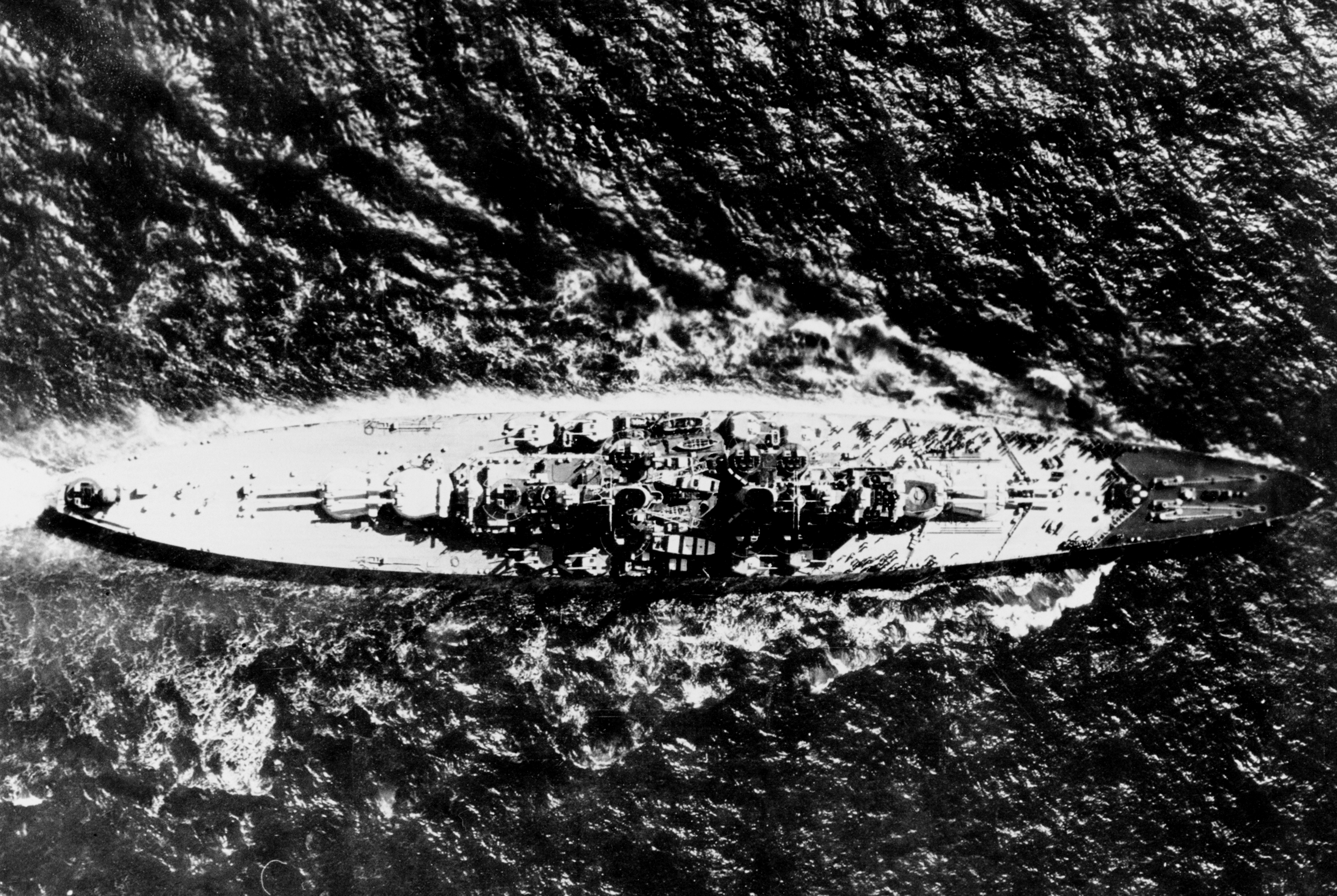
Overhead view of Vanguard

Vanguard's design was revised again, while the ship was under construction in 1942, to reflect lessons learned from the loss of the King George V-class battleship Prince of Wales and operations with the other battleships. The longitudinal distance between the inboard and outboard propellers was increased from 33.5 to 51.5 feet (10.2 to 15.7 m) to reduce the chance of a single torpedo wrecking both propeller shafts on one side and watertight access trunks were added to all spaces below the deep waterline to prevent the progressive flooding through open watertight doors and hatches that had happened to Prince of Wales. This change and the relocation of some of the 5.25-inch (133 mm) ammunition handling rooms from the lower deck to the middle deck seriously delayed the ship's completion. The design requirement that the guns of 'A' turret be capable of firing straight ahead at 0° of elevation was sacrificed to allow her freeboard forward to be increased, and her bow was reshaped to make it less prone to shipping water and throwing sea spray in head seas. The ship's fuel supply was increased from 4,400 long tons (4,500 t) to 4,850 long tons (4,930 t) to prevent the fuel shortage problems suffered by King George V and Rodney during their pursuit of the German battleship Bismarck. The Unrotated Projectile mounts were deleted from the design and the light anti-aircraft armament was increased to a total of 76 two-pounders in one quadruple, and nine octuple mounts and 24 Oerlikon 20 mm cannon were also added in 12 twin mounts. Space for these was made available by removing the two floatplanes, the catapult and their associated facilities.

A proposal was made in 1942 to convert Vanguard to an aircraft carrier. The Director of Naval Construction stated that doing so along the lines of the Audacious class would present no major difficulties but would require six months to redesign the ship. The proposal was formally rejected on 17 July.

=== General characteristics ===
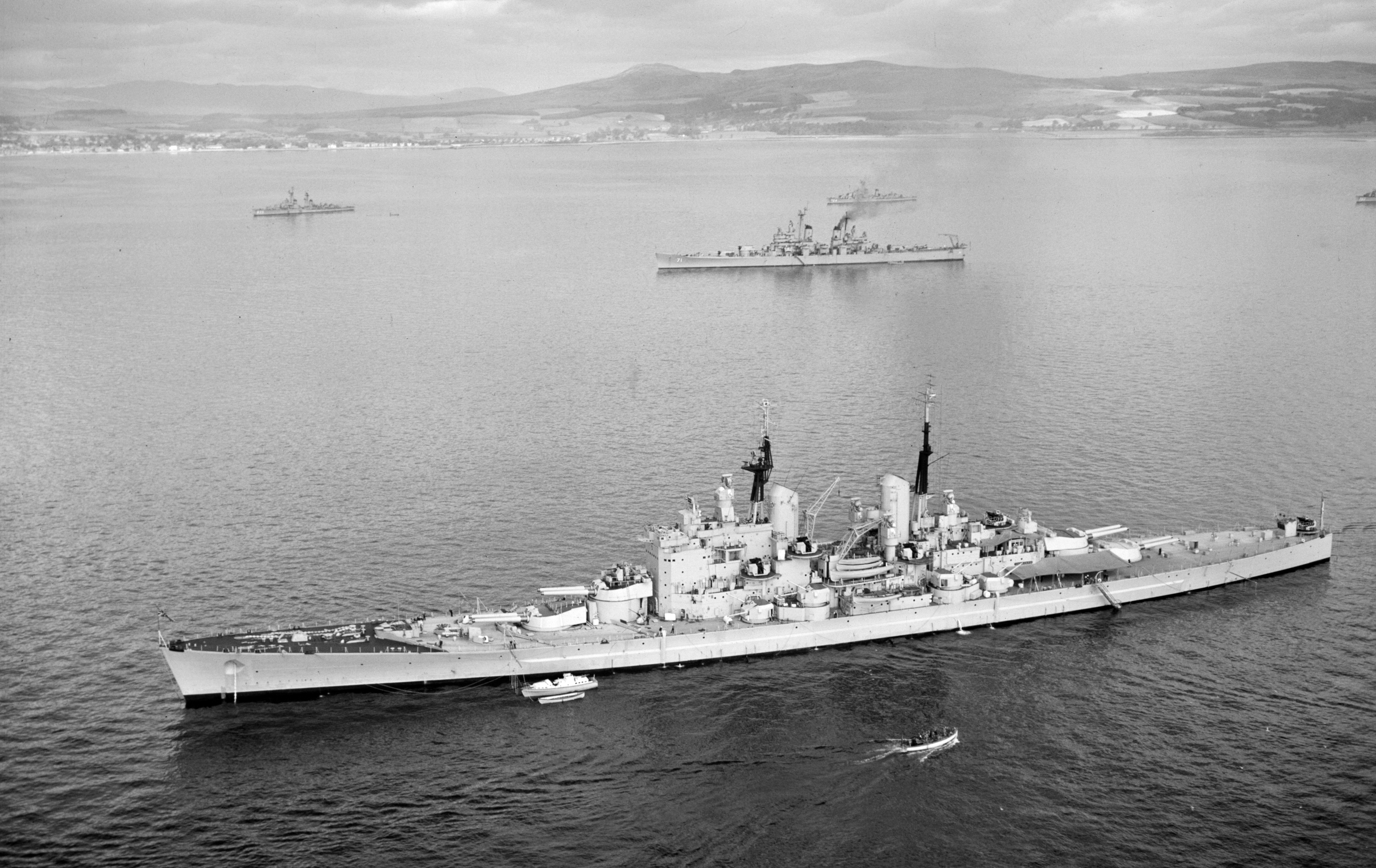
Vanguard during NATO Operation Mainbrace, 1952

Vanguard had an overall length of 814 feet 4 inches (248.2 m), a beam of 107 feet 6 inches (32.8 m) and a draught of 36 feet (11 m) at deep load. She displaced 44,500 long tons (45,200 t) at standard load and 51,420 long tons (52,250 t) at deep load. The ship was significantly larger than her predecessors of the class, almost 50 feet (15.2 m) longer and displacing about 6,000 long tons (6,100 t) more than the older ships at deep load. Vanguard was overweight by some 2,200 long tons (2,200 t), which magnified the difference. The ship had a complete double bottom 5 feet (1.5 m) deep and she was divided into 27 main compartments by watertight bulkheads.

The King George V-class ships had been built with almost no sheer to the main deck forwards to allow 'A' turret to fire straight forward at zero elevation, resulting in those ships being wet forward. Vanguard was redesigned as a result of this experience, significant sheer and flare being added to the bow. The ship's seaworthiness was well regarded, and the ship was able to keep an even keel in rough seas. At full load Vanguard had a metacentric height of 8.2 feet (2.5 m).

As a fleet flagship, her complement was 115 officers and 1,860 men in 1947. Air conditioning was provided for many of the ship's control spaces, and asbestos insulation was provided on exposed areas of the ship's sides, decks and bulkheads. Steam heating was provided for her armament, instruments, look-out positions and other equipment to make Vanguard suitable for operations in the Arctic. An Action Information Centre was fitted below the main armour deck with facilities to track aircraft and ships around Vanguard.

=== Propulsion ===
To save design time, the four-shaft unit machinery from the Lion-class battleship was duplicated with alternating boiler and engine rooms. Vanguard had four sets of single-reduction geared Parsons steam turbines housed in separate engine rooms. Each set consisted of one high-pressure and one low-pressure turbine, driving a propeller 14 feet 9 inches (4.5 m) in diameter. The turbines were powered by eight Admiralty 3-drum boilers in four boiler rooms at a working pressure of 350 psi (2,413 kPa; 25 kgf/cm^{2}) and temperature of 700 °F (371 °C). The engines were designed to produce a total of 130,000 shaft horsepower (97,000 kW) and a speed of 30 knots (56 km/h; 35 mph), but achieved more than 136,000 shp (101,000 kW) during the ship's sea trials in July 1946, when she reached a speed of 31.57 knots (58.47 km/h; 36.33 mph). After trials, the three-bladed propellers on the inboard shafts were replaced by five-bladed propellers to reduce vibrations of the inboard propeller shafts, but this was a failure.

Vanguard was designed to carry 4,850 long tons of fuel oil and 427 long tons (434 t) of diesel fuel. With a clean bottom she could steam at a speed of 15 knots (28 km/h; 17 mph) for 8,250 nautical miles (15,280 km; 9,490 mi). The ship had four 480-kilowatt (640 hp) turbogenerators and four 450-kilowatt (600 hp) diesel generators that supplied electricity via the common ring main at 220 volts. Their total output of 3,720 kilowatts (4,990 hp) was the largest of any British battleship.

=== Armament ===
The ship's main armament consisted of eight 42-calibre BL 15-inch Mk I guns in four twin hydraulically powered gun turrets, 'A', 'B', 'X' and 'Y' from bow to stern. The guns were loaded at +5°; when the turrets were modernised to the Mk I(N) RP12 design, their maximum elevation was increased from 20° to +30°. They fired 1,938-pound (879 kg) projectiles at a muzzle velocity of 2,458 ft/s (749 m/s), for a maximum normal range of 33,550 yards (30,680 m). The guns could use supercharges, which gave a maximum range of 37,870 yards (34,630 m) with the same shells. Their rate of fire was two rounds per minute. Vanguard carried 100 shells per gun.

Animation representing the loading cycle of the Mark I turret for the BL 15 inch Mark I.

The old 15-inch turrets had been designed when the customary practice was to place the magazine above the shell room, and it was not cost-effective to modify the ammunition hoists to accommodate the opposite arrangement, which had been adopted after the Battle of Jutland demonstrated the dangers of exposing the magazines to long-range gunfire. The ship was provided with a powder-handling room above the shell room to mimic the arrangement that the turrets' hoists were designed to handle, and another set of hoists moved the propellant charges from the magazines to the powder-handling room. The charges were stowed in cases to reduce their exposure to fire.

The secondary armament consisted of sixteen 50-calibre QF 5.25-inch Mk I* dual-purpose guns in eight twin gun mounts. They had a maximum depression of −5° and a maximum elevation of 70°. They fired an 80-pound (36.3 kg) high-explosive shell at a muzzle velocity of 2,672 ft/s (814 m/s). The improved RP10 spec 5.25 turrets on Vanguard were claimed to be fully automatic, with a power-rammed breech and automatic tracking and elevation under radar control enabling a rate of fire of about 18 rounds per minute. At maximum elevation, the guns had a maximum range of 24,070 yards (22,010 m). 391 rounds were provided for each gun.

Short-range air defence was provided by 73 Bofors 40 mm AA guns in a variety of mountings. Vanguard had ten sextuple-barrel power-operated mounts concentrated in the superstructure and stern, a twin-barrel mount on 'B' turret and 11 power-operated single mounts on the upper deck and rear superstructure. All mounts could depress to −10° and elevate to +90°. The 40-millimetre (1.6 in) gun fired a 1.97-pound (0.89 kg) shell at a muzzle velocity of 2,890 ft/s (880 m/s) to a distance of 10,750 yards (9,830 m). The guns' rate of fire was approximately 120 rounds per minute. Space was not available to stow the standard allowance of 1,564 rounds per gun, and Vanguard carried only 1,269 rounds per gun. Two of the single guns on the quarterdeck were removed in 1949, and five others during a major refit in 1954. All of her multiple Bofors mounts were removed at this same time.

=== Fire control ===
Vanguard was unique among British battleships in having remote power control (RPC) for her main, secondary and tertiary guns along with the Admiralty Fire Control Table Mk X for surface fire control of the main armament. There were two director control towers (DCT) for the 15-inch guns, each carrying a "double cheese" Type 274 fire-control radar for range finding and spotting the fall of shot. Each DCT could control all four turrets, 'B' turret could control 'A' and 'X' turrets, and 'X' turret could control 'Y' turret. There were four American Mark 37 DCTs for the 5.25-inch guns, each carrying the twin domes of Type 275 gunnery radar. Each Mark VI sextuple 40 mm Bofors mounting was provided with a separate CRBF ("close range blind fire") director fitted with a Type 262 radar, although the ship never mounted her complete outfit of those directors. The STAAG Mk II 40 mm Bofors mounting carried its own Type 262 on the mounting itself. Other radar sets carried were Type 960 air and surface search, Type 293 target indication and Type 277 radar height finding.

When the 15-inch gun turrets were modernised, their 15-foot (4.6 m) rangefinders were replaced by 30-foot (9.1 m) ones in all turrets except 'A', and they were fitted for RPC in azimuth only. The turrets were also provided with de-humidifying equipment and insulation to improve their habitability.

=== Protection ===
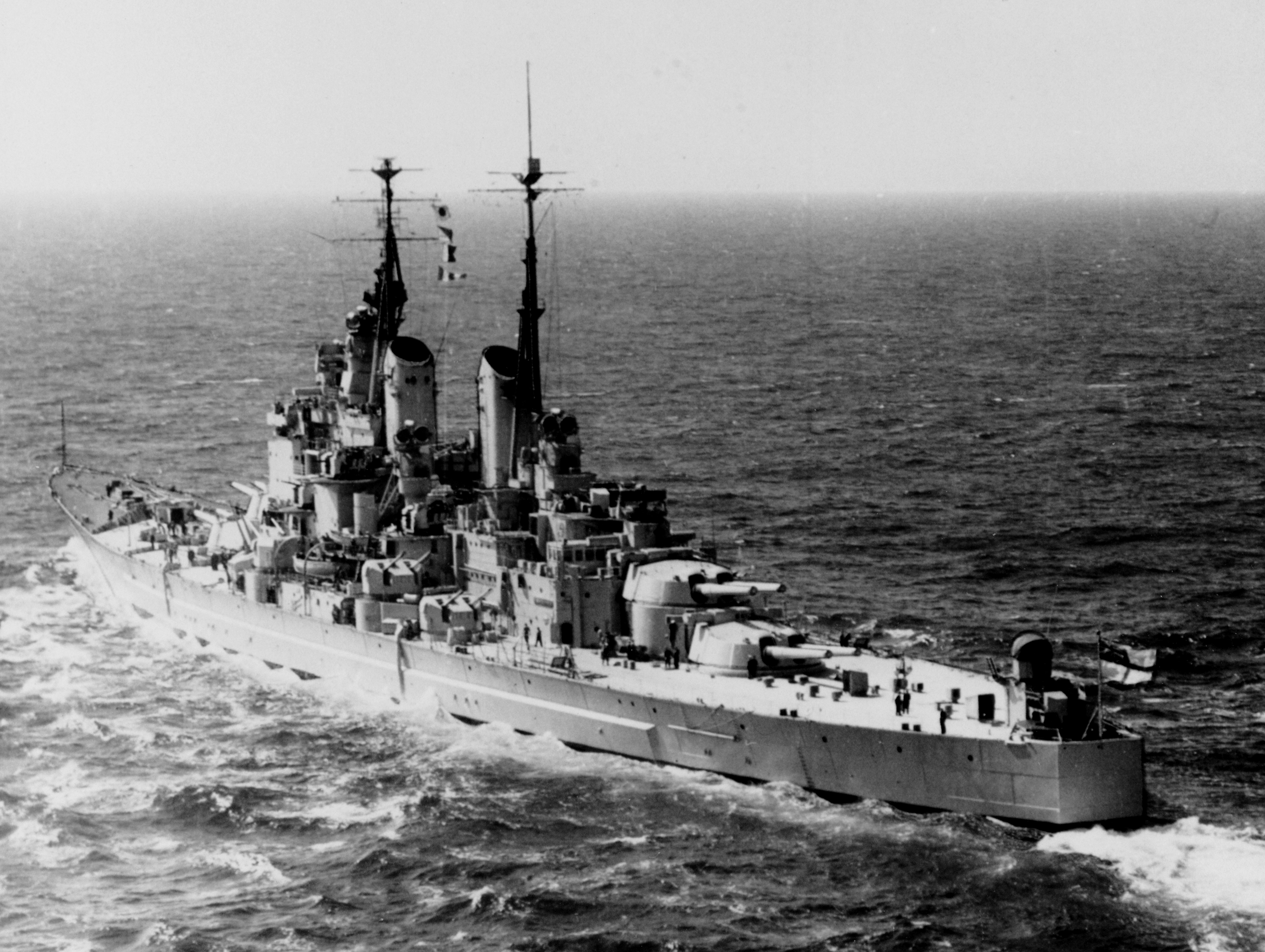
Rear quarter view of Vanguard showing her transom stern

The ship's armour scheme was based on that of the King George V class with a thinner waterline belt and additional splinter protection. Originally the belt armour was equal to that of the older ships, but it had to be reduced to offset weight increases when the design was modified to reflect wartime experience. The waterline 460-foot (140.2 m) main belt was composed of Krupp cemented armour (KCA) 13 inches (330 mm) thick but increased to 14 inches (356 mm) abreast the magazines. It was 24 feet (7.3 m) high and tapered to a thickness of 4.5 inches (114 mm) at the bottom edge of the belt. Fore and aft of the 12-inch (305 mm) transverse bulkheads that closed off the central citadel, the belt continued almost to the ends of the ship. Forward it tapered to a thickness of 2 inches (51 mm) and a height of 8 feet (2.4 m), and aft to the same thickness but a height of 11 feet (3.4 m). At the aft end of the steering gear compartment was a 4-inch (102 mm) transverse bulkhead. After the Battle of the Denmark Strait in 1941, 1.5-inch (38 mm) non-cemented armour bulkheads were added on the sides of the magazines, to protect them from splinters from any hits from plunging shells that might have penetrated the ship's side beneath her belt.

When the gun turrets from the First World War-era battlecruisers were modernised, their KCA faceplates were replaced by new ones 13 inches thick, and their roofs were replaced by 6-inch (152 mm) non-cemented armour plates. Their sides remained 7–9 inches (180–230 mm) in thickness. The barbettes for the 15-inch guns were 13 inches thick on the sides but tapered to 11–12 inches (279–305 mm) closer to the centreline of the ship. The side and roof armour of the 5.25-inch turrets was 2.5 inches (64 mm) thick. Their ammunition hoists were protected by armour 2–6 inches (51–152 mm) thick.

Intended to resist the impact of a 1,000-pound (450 kg) armour-piercing bomb dropped from a height of 14,000 feet (4,300 m), Vanguard's deck protection was identical to that of the King George V class, six-inch non-cemented armour over the magazines that reduced to 5 inches (127 mm) over the machinery spaces. The armour continued forward and aft of the citadel at the lower-deck level. Forward it tapered in steps from five inches down to 2.5 inches near the bow. Aft, it protected the steering gear and propeller shafts with 4.5 inches of armour before tapering to a thickness of 2.5 inches near the stern. Unlike the Germans, French and Americans, the British no longer believed that heavy armour for the conning tower served any real purpose given that the chance of hitting it was very small; Vanguard's conning tower was therefore protected with 3 inches (76 mm) of armour on the face and 2.5 inches on the sides and rear. The secondary conning tower aft had 2 inches (51 mm) of armour on its sides.

Vanguard's underwater protection was enhanced when she was redesigned in 1942 to reflect the lessons learned when Prince of Wales was sunk by Japanese torpedo bombers. It still consisted of a three-layer system of voids and liquid-filled compartments meant to absorb the energy of an underwater explosion. It was bounded on the inside by the 1.75–1.5-inch (44–38 mm) torpedo bulkhead. Her enlarged oil tanks reduced the empty spaces that could flood and cause the ship to list, and greater provision was made to pump these spaces out. The longitudinal bulkheads of the side protection system were raised one deck higher to further subdivide the spaces behind the waterline armour belt. The side protection system had a maximum depth of 15 feet (4.6 m), but this decreased significantly as the ship narrowed at its ends. Over the length of the citadel, this system was found during full-scale trials to be proof against 1,000 pounds (450 kg) of TNT.

== Construction and career ==
Vanguard was laid down on 2 October 1941 by John Brown and Company of Clydebank, Scotland, with the yard number of 567. After the Japanese invasion of Malaya in December, the ship was given an A1 priority in the hope of finishing her by the end of 1944, and construction of the light cruiser HMS Bellerophon, as well as some merchant shipping, was halted to expedite the ship's completion. This was unsuccessful, however, due to a shortage of skilled labour. As a result, it was not until 30 November 1944 that the ship was launched. Princess Elizabeth presided over this ceremony, the first ship she ever launched, and was presented with a diamond rose brooch to commemorate the event. Two yard workers were killed and six others injured when a "blinding explosion ripped" the ship in a fitting-out basin at Clydebank on 16 September 1945. Captain William Gladstone Agnew assumed command on 15 October 1945. The end of hostilities following Japan's surrender reduced the need for new warships, and consequently the ship was not commissioned until 12 May 1946. By this time, a total of £11,530,503, including £3,186,868 for the modernisation of the main armament, had been spent on producing Vanguard.

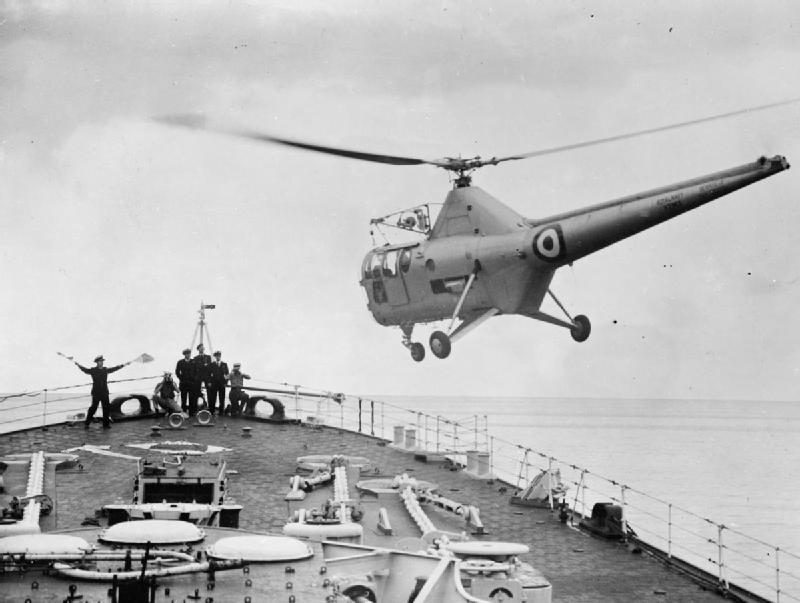
A Westland WS-51 Dragonfly coming in to land on the ship's foc'sle

After commissioning, the ship spent several months conducting sea trials and training until August, when she began the necessary modifications to serve as a royal yacht for the forthcoming royal tour of South Africa. The Admiral's suite was reworked into accommodations for the Royal Family and their staff while the anti-aircraft mount on top of 'B' turret was replaced by a saluting platform. Agnew was promoted to rear-admiral with effect from 8 January 1947. The alterations were complete by December, and Vanguard made a shakedown cruise into the Central Atlantic and made a port visit to Gibraltar on the return voyage. Initially escorted by the destroyers Orwell, Obedient, Offa, Opportune, and Rotherham, the ship rendezvoused with the Home Fleet on 1 February 1947 to receive a 21-gun salute led by the battleships Nelson and Duke of York, and the aircraft carrier Implacable. Later that morning, a Hoverfly helicopter landed aboard to pick up mail and photographic film.

Vanguard arrived in Cape Town on 17 February, escorted by the South African frigates Good Hope, Transvaal and Natal on the last leg of her voyage. While the Royal Family toured the country on the first visit by a reigning monarch to South Africa, the ship exercised with ships of the South African and Royal Navies stationed there and made port visits to a number of South African cities. She sailed for home on 22 April and made brief visits to Saint Helena and Ascension Island en route. Vanguard arrived in Portsmouth on 11 May, and Captain F. R. Parham relieved the newly promoted Agnew on 29 May. In July, the ship began an overhaul in Devonport, which lasted until August 1948. While she was refitting, Vanguard was tasked to carry the Royal Family on a tour of Australia and New Zealand, planned for January 1949. On 31 August, she began a shakedown cruise to the Mediterranean and returned to Devonport on 12 November. Around this time, Vanguard was considered, along with a number of other large warships, for conversion to carry anti-aircraft missiles, but nothing further was done along these lines.

George VI was now too ill for travel, and the Royal Tour was indefinitely postponed later that month. Vanguard became the flagship of Admiral Sir Arthur Power, Commander-in-Chief of the Mediterranean Fleet, on 1 March 1949, and the ship made port visits to Algeria, France, Italy, Cyprus, Libya, Lebanon, Greece and Egypt before she arrived back at Devonport on 21 July. The newly promoted Rear Admiral Parham was relieved by Captain G. V. Gladstone a week later. The ship then became the flagship of the Home Fleet Training Squadron under Rear Admiral Edward Evans-Lombe on 12 November. While returning from a brief training sortie to Gibraltar, Vanguard went to the aid of a small French merchantman whose cargo had shifted in a severe storm on 13 February 1950. The merchantman, SS Boffa, was taken under tow and the cargo was redistributed. Once the storm had abated, Boffa was able to resume her voyage under her own power. Vanguard reached Weymouth Bay the following day. Later, in March, she fired the salute to Vincent Auriol, the President of France, during his state visit to Great Britain.

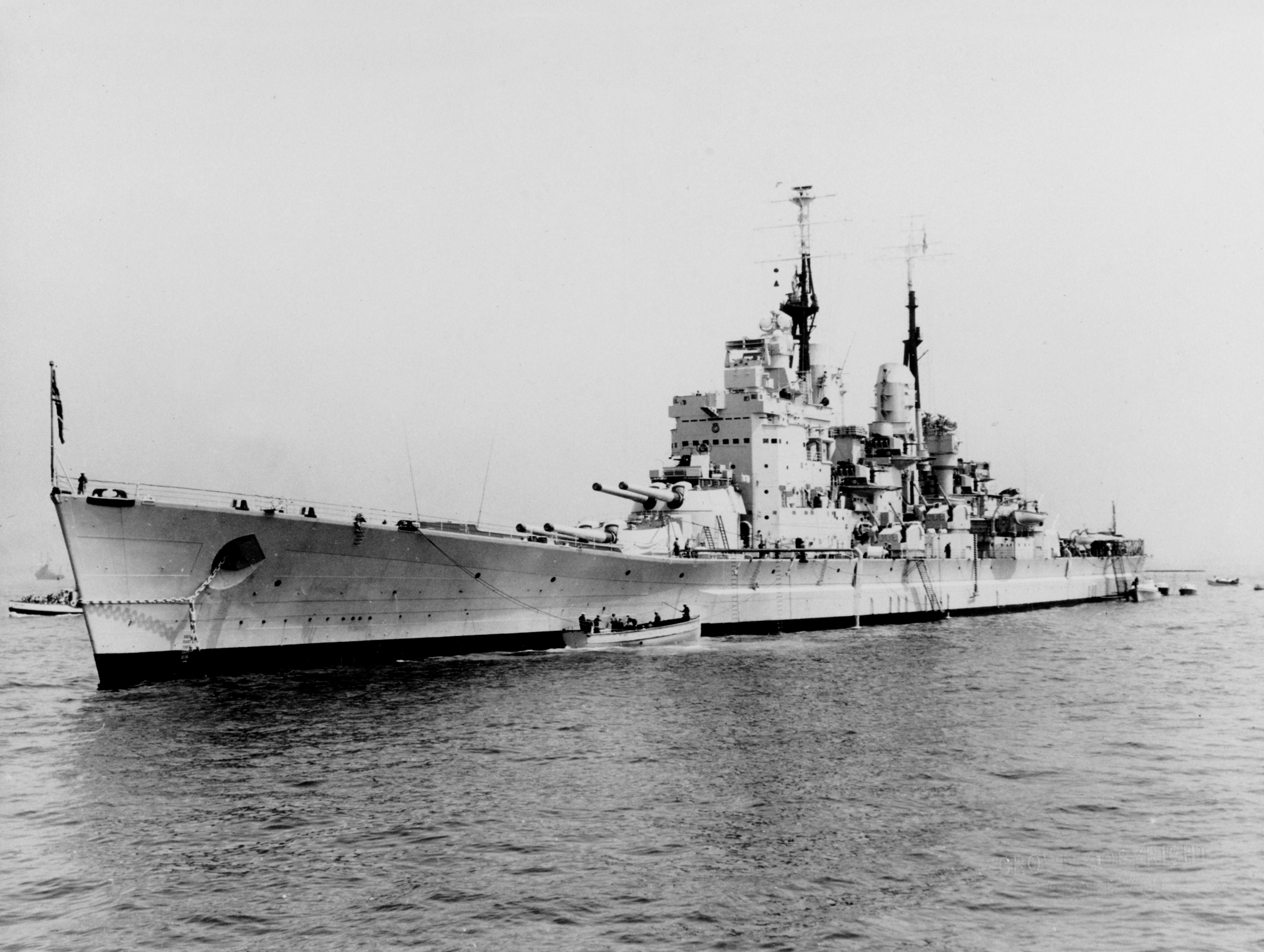
Vanguard at anchor

On 13 September 1950 Admiral Sir Philip Vian hoisted his flag as Commander in Chief, Home Fleet, on Vanguard and the ship joined the rest of Home Fleet on exercises with the Royal Canadian Navy and the Mediterranean Fleet. On 19 December, Vian transferred his flag to Indomitable. Nearly two months later, on 10 February 1951, the aircraft carrier collided with Vanguard as the carrier docked at Gibraltar. The hole in the battleship's stern was not serious, and Vian re-hoisted his flag on Vanguard shortly afterwards. After manoeuvres with Indomitable, during which her aircraft "sank" the battleship, the ship made port visits in Genoa and Villefranche-sur-Mer before returning for a brief refit in Devonport on 14 March. After completing her refit in May, she became flagship of the Home Fleet Training Squadron under Rear Admiral R. M. Dick at the Isle of Portland. Four months later the admiral transferred his flag to the carrier Indefatigable as Vanguard began another refit in preparation to again become the flagship of Home Fleet.

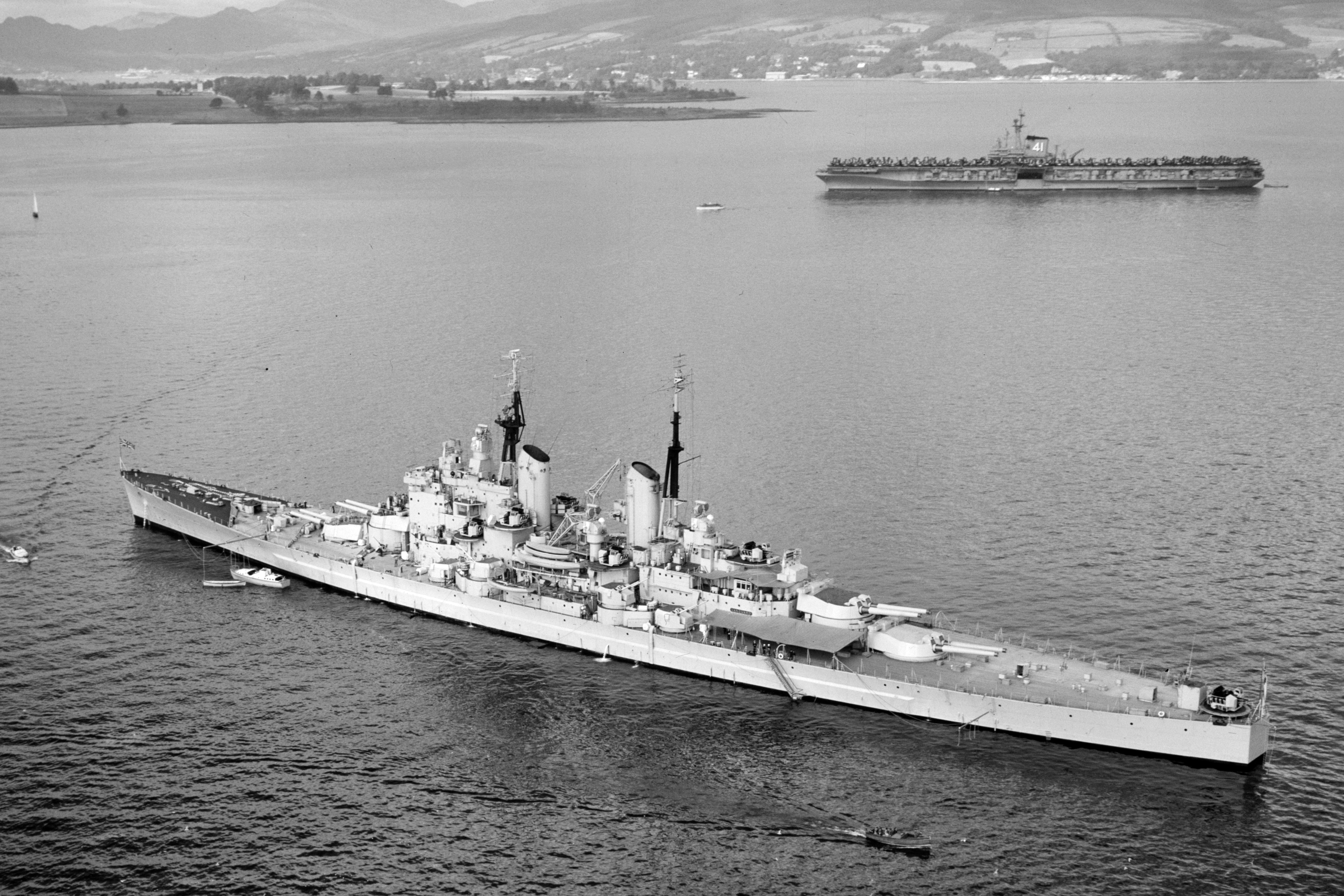
Vanguard and USS Midway in the Firth of Clyde during Exercise Mainbrace, September 1952

Buckingham Palace announced in November that King George VI was planning to take a short cruise for his health aboard Vanguard, which meant that her Admiral's suite again had to be modified to accommodate him and his staff. Captain John Litchfield assumed command on 21 December while the ship was still refitting, but the King died on 6 February 1952 before he could make his cruise. A detachment from the ship participated in his funeral procession before she departed for her post-refit shakedown cruise on 22 February. After exercising with Implacable, Indomitable and the fast minelayer Apollo, Vanguard returned home on 29 March. She became flagship of Home Fleet again on 13 May when Admiral Sir George Creasy hoisted his flag. Due to manning and weight problems, Vanguard operated with many of her turrets unmanned and with ammunition carried for only two of the 15-inch turrets and only starshell ammunition for the 5.25-inch guns. She participated in exercises with the Dutch and American navies, before returning to Portsmouth for the holidays. Litchfield was relieved by Captain R. A. Ewing on 19 January 1953; the ship departed the next day for a brief refit at Gibraltar. After its completion on 2 March, the ship trained with several of the Royal Navy's carriers before arriving back at Portsmouth on 25 March. Vanguard participated in Queen Elizabeth's Coronation Fleet Review at Spithead on 15 June 1953. The following September, she participated in NATO's Exercise Mariner in the Denmark Strait.

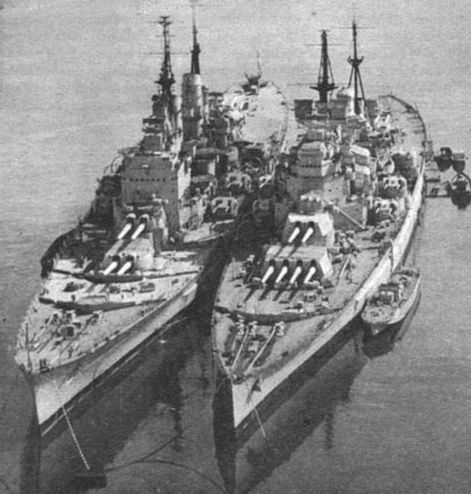
Vanguard (left) alongside Howe in reserve at Devonport, 1956

Admiral Sir Michael Denny replaced Creasy as Commander-in-Chief, Home Fleet, on 5 January 1954 and Vanguard participated in Exercise Medflex A with Dutch and French ships in March. During the rest of the year she participated in anti-submarine and anti-aircraft exercises as well as making port visits to Oslo and Kristiansand in Norway and Helsingborg in Sweden. She was inspected on 11 July by King Gustaf VI Adolf of Sweden before returning home later that month. Denny struck his flag on 15 September, and Vanguard sailed to Devonport for a £220,000 refit 10 days later. The February 1955 Defence Estimates had intended her as the Home Fleet flagship with a role as a Sverdlov-class cruiser killer, but after the appointment of Earl Mountbatten in April 1955 and with Antony Eden replacing Churchill as prime minister, the government decided instead to maintain two extra cruisers in the fleet, citing the fact that strike aircraft would be the primary method of countering Soviet surface forces and that two cruisers were more flexible in their ability to be deployed in peacetime, and Vanguard was placed in reserve when it completed its 1955 refit. She subsequently became the flagship of the Reserve Fleet when Vice Admiral Richard Onslow hoisted his flag on 28 November. While moored in Fareham Creek, during her time in the reserve fleet, waterline shots of Vanguard in Portsmouth Harbour were filmed for the title sequence of the 1957 comedy film Carry on Admiral. Just before decommissioning, scenes for the 1960 film Sink the Bismarck! were filmed aboard, with Vanguard being used to depict interiors of the bridges, Admiral's Quarters and gun turrets for Hood, Bismarck and King George V.

=== Decommissioning and fate ===
On 9 October 1959 the Admiralty announced that Vanguard would be scrapped, as she was considered obsolete and too expensive to maintain. Reportedly she was offered to the Chilean Navy, along with other retired warships. She was decommissioned on 7 June 1960 and sold to BISCO for £560,000. On 4 August 1960, when the ship was scheduled to be towed from Portsmouth to the breaker's yard at Faslane, Scotland, the whole of the Southsea sea front was packed with people who came to see her off. As Vanguard was being towed towards the harbour entrance, she slewed across the harbour and ran aground near the Still & West pub. She was pulled off by five tugboats an hour later, and made her final exit from Portsmouth. Five days later she arrived at Faslane, and by mid-1962 the demolition process was complete. She was the last British battleship to be scrapped.

As a part of the scrapping process, sections of 150-millimetre-thick (5.9 in) pre-atomic steel plate uncontaminated with radionuclides were recovered from Vanguard and used for the shielding of the whole body monitor at the Radiobiological Research Laboratory (now DSTL) at Alverstoke, Gosport, in Hampshire, England.

The process of decommissioning was filmed by the Rank Organisation for their Look at Life film series in an episode entitled The Last Battleship.

== Bibliography ==
- "Explosion Rips Ship". The San Bernardino Daily Sun. Vol. 52. San Bernardino, California. Associated Press. 17 September 1945.
- Brown, D. K. & Moore, George (2003). Rebuilding the Royal Navy: Warship Design Since 1945. Annapolis, Maryland: Naval Institute Press. ISBN 1-59114-705-0.
- Campbell, John (1985). Naval Weapons of World War II. Annapolis, Maryland: Naval Institute Press. ISBN 0-87021-459-4.
- Chakelian, Anoosh (15 May 2012). "86 Surprising Facts About Queen Elizabeth II". Time. Archived from the original on 24 May 2012.
- Cowling, Giles. "From Land, Sea and Air". Defence Management Journal. 31. Archived from the original on 25 February 2012.
- Garzke, William H. Jr. & Dulin, Robert O. Jr. (1980). British, Soviet, French, and Dutch Battleships of World War II. London: Jane's. ISBN 0-7106-0078-X.
- Grove, Eric J. (2005). The Royal Navy Since 1815: A New Short History. Basingstoke, UK: Palgrave MacMillan. ISBN 0-333-72125-X.
- Lenton, H. T. (1998). British & Empire Warships of the Second World War. Annapolis, Maryland: Naval Institute Press. ISBN 1-55750-048-7.
- McCart, Neil (2001). HMS Vanguard 1944–1960: Britain's Last Battleship. Liskeard, Cornwall: Maritime Books. ISBN 0-907771-83-1.
- Order of Splendor (14 March 2013). "The Vanguard Rose Brooch". From Her Majesty's Jewel Vault.
- Parkes, Oscar (1990) [1966]. British Battleships, Warrior 1860 to Vanguard 1950: A History of Design, Construction, and Armament (New & rev. ed.). Annapolis, Maryland: Naval Institute Press. ISBN 1-55750-075-4.
- Pigott, Peter (2005). Royal Transport: An Inside Look at the History of Royal Travel. Toronto: Dundurn Press. ISBN 978-1-55002-572-9.
- Raven, Alan & Roberts, John (1976). British Battleships of World War Two: The Development and Technical History of the Royal Navy's Battleship and Battlecruisers from 1911 to 1946. Annapolis, Maryland: Naval Institute Press. ISBN 0-87021-817-4.
- Royal Museum Greenwich. "The Coronation Review, 15 June 1953". collections.rmg.co.uk.
