= Ronald A. Edwards =

South African military commander

Vice Admiral Ronald Alvin Edwards SSAS SM MMM
- Born: 23 March 1923; Paarl, Cape Province, Union of South Africa
- Died: 3 July 2014 (aged 91); South Africa
- Relatives: Amy Georgina Crumpton (wife)
- Military career
- Allegiance: South Africa
- Branch: South African Navy
- Rank: Vice Admiral
- Commands: Chief of the Navy
- Awards: Star of South Africa SSAS Southern Cross Medal SM Military Merit Medal MMM Good Service Medal Union Medal 1939–45 Star Africa Star War Medal 1939–1945 Africa Service Medal (WWII) Order of May (Naval Merit)

Vice Admiral Ronald Alvin Edwards SSAS SM MMM (1923–2014) was a South African military commander.

== Military career ==
He joined the Union Defence Force in 1940 and served in 2 Anti Aircraft Artillery Brigade. In 1946 he was appointed CO of 8 Coastal Artillery, after which he served in the South African Marine Corps on Robben Island before transferring to the South African Navy in 1950. He was Officer Commanding of the Naval Provost Unit from April 1959 to December 1960

He served as Chief of Staff Personnel from 1 October 1977 to 31 January 1980 before becoming Chief of the Navy from 1 February 1980 to 30 September 1982.

== Awards and decorations ==
- Star of South Africa (Silver) (SSAS)
- Southern Cross Medal (1952) (SM)
- Military Merit Medal (MMM)
- Good Service Medal (Gold (30 Years))
- Good Service Medal (Silver (20 Years))
- Union Medal
- 1939–45 Star
- Africa Star
- War Medal 1939–1945
- Africa Service Medal (WWII)
- Order of May (Naval Merit) (Grand Cross) (Note: Spanish: Orden de Mayo (Al Mérito Naval) - Gran Cruz)

== See also ==
- List of South African military chiefs
- South African Navy

Military offices
Preceded by Johan Charl Walters	Chief of the South African Navy; 1980–1982	Succeeded by Andries Putter
Preceded by Pieter le Grange	Chief of Staff Personnel; 1977–1980	Succeeded by Gert Boshoff
