= John Fairbairn (naval officer) =

South African admiral (1912–1984)

- Born: 8 March 1912; Plumstead, Cape Town
- Died: 20 March 1984 (aged 72); Tygerberg, Cape Town
- Spouse: Tessa
- Relatives: John Fairbairn (grandfather)
- Military career
- Allegiance: South Africa
- Branch: South African Navy
- Service years: 1939–1972
- Rank: Commodore
- Commands: HMSAS Transvaal; SAS President Steyn (F147); OC Naval Base Simon's Town
- Conflicts: World War 2
- Awards: Southern Cross Medal SM Queen Elizabeth II Coronation Medal Union Medal 1939–45 Star Atlantic Star Africa Star War Medal 1939–1945 Africa Service Medal (WWII) Order of Prince Henry GCIH

Commodore John Fairbairn (12 March 1912 – 20 March 1984) was a South African Naval officer.

Fairbairn was born in Plumstead, Cape Town. After being educated at Diocesan College in Rondebosch, he started working at the Standard Bank in 1930. He joined the Royal Navy Volunteer Reserve (RNVR) on 1 July 1929 on a part-time basis while still working at the bank until the start of World War II, when he signed up to the South African Navy full-time on 4 September 1939 and was promoted to lieutenant on 12 November the same year.

On 1 May 1946, he joined the SA Navy Permanent Force and was given the rank of lieutenant-commander. On 4 January 1948 while in command of the Loch-class frigate HMSAS Transvaal, the Marion and Prince Edward islands were annexed from Great Britain. He commanded the Rothesay-class frigate SAS President Steyn before being appointed naval officer in charge (NoiC) of the Simon's Town Naval Base.

Fairbairn retired in 1972 and died in Cape Town in March 1984.

== Awards and decorations ==
- Southern Cross Medal (1952) (SM)
- Union Medal
- Queen Elizabeth II Coronation Medal
- 1939–45 Star
- Atlantic Star
- Africa Star (NORTH AFRICA 1942–43 clasp)
- War Medal 1939–1945
- Africa Service Medal (WWII)
- Order of Prince Henry (Grand Cross) (GCIH) (Note: Portuguese: Grã-Cruz - The star bears the Portuguese inscription Talant de bien faire)
