= Willem du Plessis =

South African admiral

Rear Admiral Willem du Plessis SD SM SAN (Rtd)
- Military career
- Branch: South African Navy
- Rank: Rear admiral
- Service number: 64245137PE
- Commands: Senior official, National Intelligence Service; Deputy Chief of Staff Intelligence; Defence advisor to the US
- Conflicts: Border War
- Awards: Southern Cross Decoration SD Southern Cross Medal SM Pro Patria Medal Good Service Medal Permanent Force Good Service Medal
- Other work: National Intelligence Service

Willem du Plessis SD SM SAN (Rtd) is a retired Rear Admiral of the South African Navy. He was appointed as a Defence Advisor to Washington, DC at the South African Embassy with the rank of commodore in the mid seventies, and in 1979 he was expelled by the United States' State Department for alleged espionage back to the Republic of South Africa. He was later promoted to rank of rear admiral and served as Deputy Chief of Staff Intelligence and later seconded to the National Intelligence Service. Despite being expelled in 1979 du Plessis visited the US in 1981 with the then Chief of Staff Intelligence but was recognized and the party had to leave the US.

== Awards ==
- Southern Cross Decoration (SD) (South Africa)
- Southern Cross Medal (1952) (SM) (South Africa)
- Military Merit Medal (MMM) (South Africa)
- Pro Patria Medal (South Africa)
- Good Service Medal (Gold (30 Years)) (South Africa)
- Good Service Medal (Silver (20 Years)) (South Africa)
- Permanent Force Good Service Medal (South Africa)

Military offices
Unknown	Deputy Chief of Staff Intelligence –	Unknown
