= Emily Masanabo =

South African naval officer

Mmalekhina Emily Masanabo
- Born: Wallmansthal, Pretoria
- Military career
- Allegiance: South Africa
- Branch: South African Navy
- Rank: Rear Admiral (Junior Grade)
- Nickname: Emza
- Commands: Director Naval Transformation; Acting Director Naval Reserves

Rear Admiral (Junior Grade) Mmalekhina Emily Masanabo is a South African naval officer, currently serving as Director Naval Transformation.

As a Seaman in November 1994, she joined the Military Police, becoming the first African woman to do so. She was also amongst the first African women to join the South African Army.

She was promoted to Rear Admiral (jg) on 1 November 2010.
