= Edward Ratala =

South African Naval officer

- Born: March 3 Soweto, Johannesburg, South Africa
- Spouse: Dithole Thebe-Ratala
- Relatives: Daughter Koketso Son Samora Grandson Biko
- Military career
- Allegiance: South Africa
- Branch: South African Navy
- Rank: Admiral
- Nicknames: Trigger, Trinity
- Service number: 98010820 PE
- Commands: Navy Inspector General; OC Naval Base Durban

Admiral Edward Ratala was a South African Naval officer.

He commanded Naval Base Durban till December 2003 before being promoted to flag rank and appointed Director Joint Operations Plans at the Joint Operations Division

He was appointed Director Naval Transformation in 2009 and became Inspector General of the Navy on 1 November 2010.

He retired in February 2014.

== Awards and decorations ==
- Operational Medal for Southern Africa
- South Africa Service Medal
- Unitas (Unity) Medal
- Medalje vir Troue Diens (Medal for Loyal Service) (30 Year Clasp)
- Good Service Medal (Silver (20 Years))
- Service Medal (Bronze)

Military offices
| Preceded by John G Barker | Inspector General Navy; 2010 – 2014 | Unknown |
| Unknown | Director Naval Transformation; 2006 – 2010 | Unknown |
| Unknown | Director Joint Operations Plans, J Ops Div; 2003 – 2006 | Unknown |
