= Nomonde Gogi-Gumede =

South African naval officer

- Military career
- Allegiance: South Africa
- Branch: South African Navy
- Service years: 1997 -
- Rank: Rear Admiral (junior grade)
- Service number: 97093801PE
- Commands: Director Maritime Intelligence

Rear Admiral (junior grade) Nomonde Gogi-Gumede is a South African naval officer, currently serving as Director Maritime Intelligence.

She matriculated from Nyameko High School in Mdantsane in 1990. She joined the Navy and attended the SA Naval College before being appointed as a Public Relations Officer in January 1998. In 2000 she completed the Junior Staff and Command course and in 2004 was promoted to commander and appointed as Staff Officer Affirmative Action at Defence Headquarters. She was promoted to captain and appointed as Senior Staff Officer Navy Transformation before serving as Acting Director Navy Transformation from January to September 2009. In 2011 she was appointed as Director Maritime Intelligence and promoted to rear admiral (junior grade).
