= Stephanus Biermann =

Stephanus Cornelis Biermann
- Born: 9 December 1918; Johannesburg
- Died: 18 February 2003 (aged 84); Cape Town, South Africa
- Spouse: May Biermann
- Relatives: Hugo Biermann (brother)
- Military career
- Allegiance: South Africa
- Branch: South African Navy
- Rank: Rear Admiral
- Nickname: Chips
- Commands: Chief of Staff, Training and Manning; SAS Saldanha

Rear Admiral Stephanus Cornelis Biermann (9 December 1918 – 18 February 2003) was a South African Navy officer.

== Early life ==
Biermann's father, joined the Orange Free State postal service at the age of 12 and later joined the SA Railways and Harbours as a telegraphist. Biermann was one of four children and received his schooling at Jan van Riebeeck High School in Cape Town. His brother Hugo reached the rank of admiral in the South African Navy.

== Naval career ==
Before the outbreak of World War II he was a teacher at Highlands North High School in Johannesburg. This gave rise to his nickname "Chips" after the schoolmaster Mr Chips.

Chips, along with his brothers Phillip and Hugo served on minesweepers during World War II. He served aboard HMSAS Natal and took part in Operation Zipper in the Far East.

After the war he returned to teaching but rejoined the Navy as an officer and commanded the Naval Gymnasium, including the South African Naval College

== Death ==
Biermann died at the age of 84 at a retirement home, Silvermine Village, near Cape Town.
