= SAS Good Hope =

Loch-class frigate in the South African Navy

Coordinates: 34.2683°S 18.4808°E

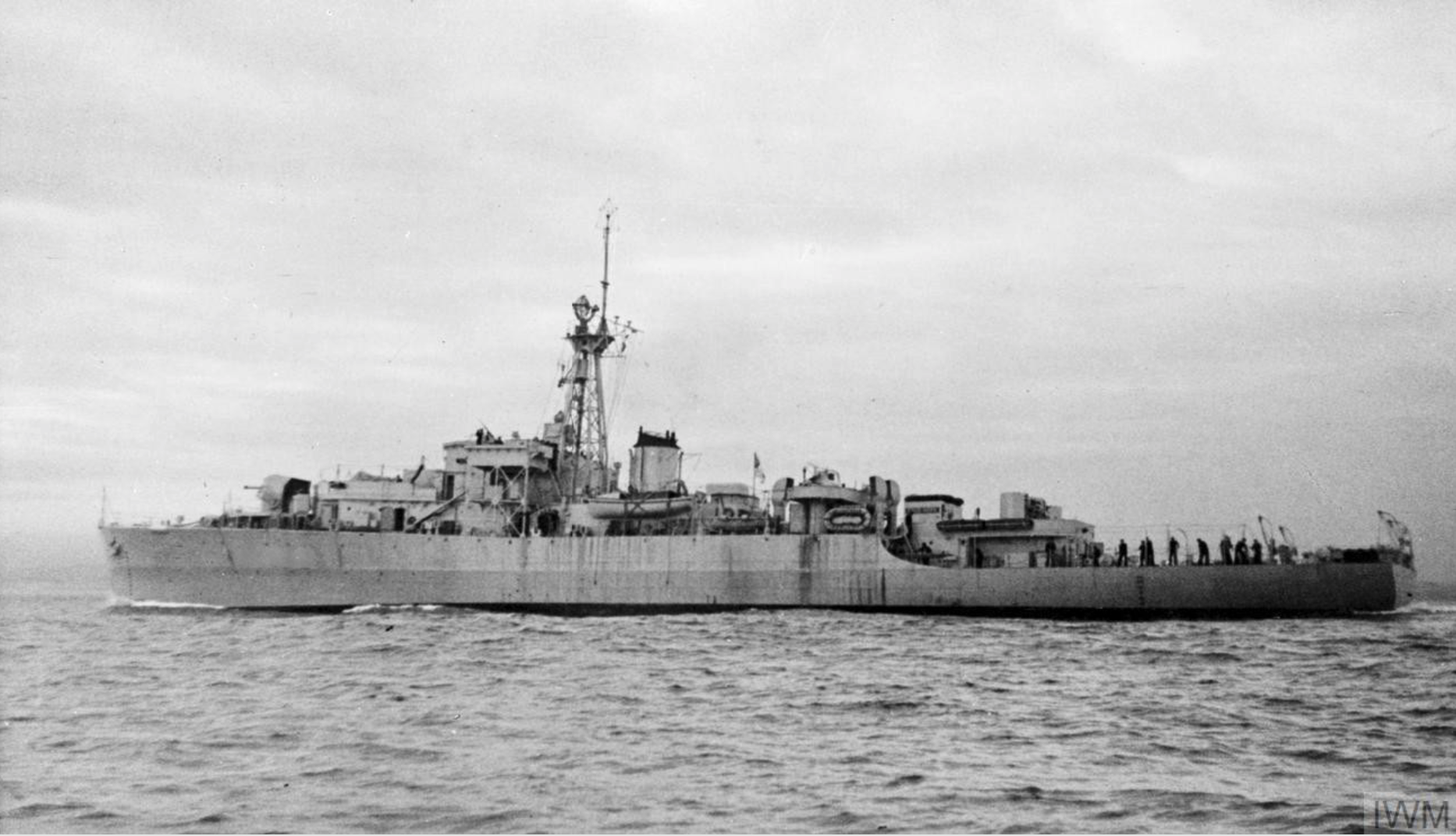
- HMSAS Good Hope, Loch Class frigate at sea in 1945

History

United Kingdom
- Name: Loch Boisdale
- Namesake: Lochboisdale
- Ordered: 28 December 1942
- Builder: Blyth Harbour and Dock Company, Blyth, Northumberland
- Laid down: 8 November 1943
- Launched: 5 July 1944
- Fate: Transferred to the South African Navy, 9 November 1944

South Africa
- Name: Good Hope
- Namesake: Cape Province
- Completed: 1 December 1944
- Acquired: 9 November 1944
- Commissioned: 9 November 1944
- Decommissioned: 1978
- Fate: Scuttled, 12 December 1978

General characteristics (as built)
- Class & type: Loch-class frigate
- Displacement: 1,435 long tons (1,458 t) (standard load)
- Length: 307 ft (93.6 m)
- Beam: 38 ft 7 in (11.8 m)
- Draught: 12 ft 4 in (3.8 m)
- Installed power: 2 Admiralty 3-drum boilers; 5,500 ihp (4,100 kW)
- Propulsion: 2 shafts; 2 × triple-expansion steam engines
- Speed: 20 knots (37 km/h; 23 mph)
- Range: 9,500 nmi (17,600 km; 10,900 mi) at 12 knots (22 km/h; 14 mph)
- Complement: 114
- Sensors & processing systems: Types 144 and 147B ASDIC; Type 277 surface-search radar
- Armament: 1 × single 4 in (102 mm) DP gun; 1 × quadruple 2 pdr (40 mm) AA gun; 2 × twin, 2 × single 20 mm (0.8 in) AA guns; 2 × triple-barrelled Squid anti-submarine mortars; 1 × rail, 2 × throwers for 15 depth charges

SAS Good Hope (pennant number: F432) was one of three Loch-class frigates in the South African Navy (SAN). It was built as HMS Loch Boisdale (K432) for the Royal Navy during World War II, but was transferred to the SAN before completion in 1944 and renamed as HMSAS Good Hope. The ship was assigned to convoy escort duties in 1945, but did not encounter any enemy ships before the end of the war.

It was assigned to ferry troops home from Egypt afterwards and made port visits in Middle Africa in 1948. Upon returning home, Good Hope was placed in reserve until it was converted into a training ship during the mid-1950s and served as the navy's flagship. The ship was again placed in reserve in 1965 and was sold for scrap in 1977. Good Hope's remains were donated for use as an artificial reef and it was scuttled the following year.

== Description ==
Good Hope displaced 1,435 long tons (1,458 t) at standard load and 2,260 long tons (2,300 t) at deep load. The ship had an overall length of 307 feet (93.6 m), a beam of 38 feet 7 inches (11.8 m) and a mean deep draught of 12 feet 4 inches (3.8 m). It was powered by a pair of vertical triple-expansion steam engines, each driving one propeller shaft, using steam provided by two Admiralty three-drum boilers. The engines developed a total of 5,500 indicated horsepower (4,100 kW) which gave a maximum speed of 20 knots (37 km/h; 23 mph). The ship carried 730 long tons (740 t) of fuel oil that gave it a range of 9,500 nautical miles (17,600 km; 10,900 mi) at 12 knots (22 km/h; 14 mph). Its main armament was a single 4-inch (102 mm) Mk V dual-purpose gun. Its anti-aircraft armament consisted of four 2-pounder (40 mm) Mk VIII "pom-pom" in a quadruple mount and six 20 mm (0.8 in) Oerlikon guns in two twin powered mounts and two single hand-operated mounts. For anti-submarine work, Good Hope was fitted with a pair of triple-barrelled Squid anti-submarine mortars and 15 depth charges delivered by one rail and two throwers. The ship was equipped with Type 144 and 147B ASDIC and a Type 277 surface-search radar. Its crew numbered 114 officers and ratings.

In preparation for her reclassification as a despatch vessel/training ship in 1955, Good Hope's Oerlikons were replaced by a pair of 40 mm (1.6 in) Bofors light AA guns on the Squid deck forward of the bridge wings and her depth charges and their gear was removed. This allowed the ship's forecastle deck to be extended right aft to add more accommodations and it was covered in teak above the new compartments. Its bridge was enlarged and a new mainmast was added. During her refit in early 1958, Good Hope's main armament was replaced by a twin-gun turret fitted with more powerful four-inch Mk XVI guns. She was refitted in 1961.

== Construction and career ==
Good Hope was built by Blyth Harbour and Dock Company at their shipyard in Blyth, Northumberland and was laid down on 8 November 1943, launched on 5 July 1944 and commissioned on 9 November 1944. The ship was originally named Loch Boisdale, but was renamed by the South Africans after it was transferred by the British while fitting out. After working up at HMS Western Isles in Tobermory, Mull, it was assigned to the 18th Escort Group of the Western Approaches Command; it was damaged during its first mission and required a month to repair the storm damage. Good Hope rejoined the 18th Escort Group which was covering convoys between England and France until the German surrender in May. It was then refitted for tropical duties before sailing for South Africa on 6 June 1945 with its sister ship, Natal, with 29 ex-prisoners of war aboard the sisters. They arrived on 30 June, but Good Hope was not sent to the Far East because the Japanese surrendered before it was ready to go.

Good Hope and her sisters Natal and Transvaal repatriated some 700 troops from Egypt between November 1945 and March 1946 and escorted the battleship HMS Vanguard while it was serving as the royal yacht during King George VI's tour of South Africa in 1947. All three sisters toured ports in Portuguese West Africa and the Belgian Congo in August–September 1948. Upon their return, Good Hope was reduced to reserve at Salisbury Island, Durban. In mid-1954 the ship began conversion into a despatch vessel in Durban and it was recommissioned on 3 June 1955 as the flagship of the South African Navy. Later that year, it conveyed the Governor General of South Africa, Ernest George Jansen, on a goodwill visit to French Madagascar. The following year, it took the navy's Chief of Staff, Rear Admiral Hugo Biermann, to Portuguese Mozambique. That same year, a South African Air Force Sikorsky S-55 helicopter landed aboard, the first helicopter deck landing aboard a South African warship. The ship was refitted in Simon's Town in early 1958 and transported Biermann to Portuguese West Africa and the Belgian Congo in August 1959. As part of this trip, it sailed some 70 miles (110 km) up the Congo River to Matadi. During the early 1960s, Good Hope was assigned fishery protection duties in addition to her normal training tasks. The ship was paid off in September 1965 and was sold for R6,500, together with her sister Transvaal, in 1977. After stripping it of all valuable metals and fittings, Good Hope's hulk was donated to the False Bay Conservation Society for use as an artificial reef. She was scuttled in False Bay on 12 December 1978.

== See also ==
- Shipwrecks of Cape Town
