= Ralph Ndabambi =

Ralph Stoto Ndabambi
- Military career
- Allegiance: South Africa
- Branch: South African Navy
- Service years: 1997 - 2016
- Rank: Rear Admiral (junior grade)
- Commands: Director Naval Reserves; Director Fleet Human Resources

Rear Admiral (junior grade) Ralph Ndabambi is a retired South African naval officer.

He joined the armed wing of the ANC, Umkhonto we Sizwe, in 1981 in Angola and was later selected to undergo naval training at Kirov College in the USSR. He returned to Tanzania in 1991 and became involved in negotiations between the ANC and the South African Government.

He joined the South African Navy in 1994. In 2005, he was promoted to Rear Admiral (junior grade) and appointed Director Naval Transformation. In 2006 he moved to Beijing as Defence Attaché. He was appointed Director Fleet Human Resources from 1 December 2009 before being appointed as Director of Naval Reserves in January 2012.
