= Cobus Visser =

South African Military Officer

- Military career
- Allegiance: South Africa
- Branch: South African Navy
- Rank: Rear Admiral (JG)
- Commands: Director Technology Development

Rear Admiral (Junior Grade) Cobus Visser is a retired South African Navy officer, who served as Director Technology Development. He was appointed on 1 January 2011 at Defence Materiel Division.

== Awards and decorations ==
- Pro Patria Medal
- Southern Africa Medal
- General Service Medal (South Africa)
- Unitas (Unity) Medal
- Medalje vir Troue Diens (Medal for Loyal Service) (20 Year Clasp)
- Good Service Medal (Bronze (10 Years))

Military offices
Preceded by Derek Dewey	Director Technology Development; 2011–201?	Unknown
