= SAS Transvaal =

Loch-class frigate in the South African Navy

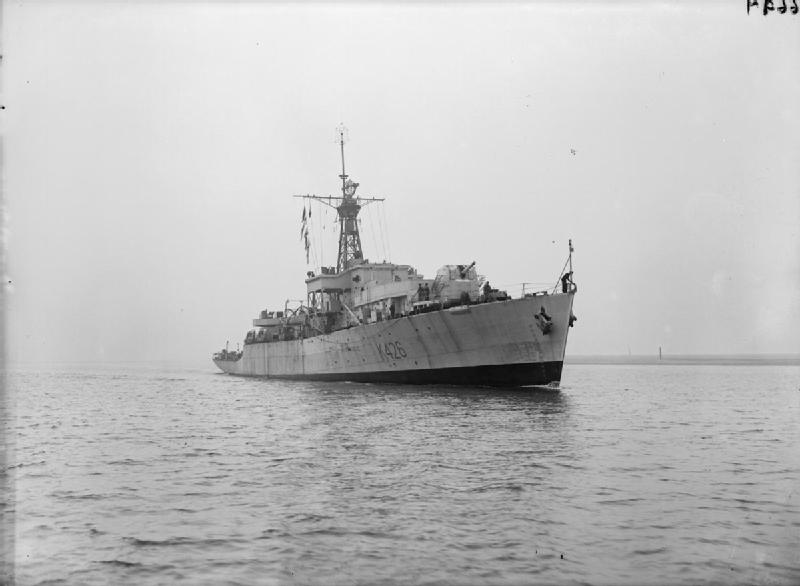
- A Loch-class frigate

History

United Kingdom
- Name: Loch Ard
- Namesake: Loch Ard
- Ordered: 2 May 1943
- Builder: Harland & Wolff, Belfast, Northern Ireland
- Laid down: 20 January 1944
- Launched: 2 August 1944
- Identification: Pennant number: K602
- Fate: Transferred to the South African Navy, 1944

South Africa
- Name: Transvaal
- Namesake: Transvaal Province
- Completed: 21 May 1945
- Acquired: 1944
- Commissioned: 14 May 1945
- Out of service: 14 August 1964
- Identification: Pennant number: F602
- Fate: Scuttled, 3 August 1978

General characteristics (as built)
- Class & type: Loch-class frigate
- Displacement: 1,435 long tons (1,458 t) (standard load); 2,260 long tons (2,300 t) (deep load)
- Length: 307 ft (93.6 m)
- Beam: 38 ft 7 in (11.8 m)
- Draught: 12 ft 4 in (3.8 m)
- Installed power: 2 Admiralty 3-drum boilers; 5,500 ihp (4,100 kW)
- Propulsion: 2 shafts; 2 × vertical triple-expansion steam engines
- Speed: 20 knots (37 km/h; 23 mph)
- Range: 9,500 nmi (17,600 km; 10,900 mi) at 12 knots (22 km/h; 14 mph)
- Complement: 114
- Sensors & processing systems: Types 144 and 147B ASDIC; Type 277 surface-search radar
- Armament: 1 × single QF 4-inch Mark V; 1 × quadruple 2-pounder (40 mm) "pom-pom" AA gun; 2 × twin, 2 × single 20 mm (0.8 in) Oerlikon AA guns; 2 × triple-barrelled Squid anti-submarine mortars; 1 × rail, 2 × throwers for 15 depth charges

SAS Transvaal was one of three Loch-class frigates in the South African Navy (SAN). She was built as HMS Loch Ard (K602) for the Royal Navy during World War II, but was transferred to the SAN in 1944 before completion and renamed as HMSAS Transvaal. The ship was completed shortly after the German surrender in May 1945 and did not participate in the war.

Transvaal was assigned to ferry troops home from Egypt after the war and participated in the annexation of the Prince Edward Islands in late 1947. Together with her sister ships, the ship made port visits in Middle Africa in 1948. Three years later, she participated in the celebration of Australia's Golden Jubilee. Transvaal received a lengthy refit in the late 1950s. The ship was placed in reserve in 1964 and was sold for scrap in 1977. Transvaal's remains were donated for use as an artificial reef and it was scuttled the following year.

== Description ==
Transvaal displaced 1,435 long tons (1,458 t) at standard load and 2,260 long tons (2,300 t) at deep load. The ship had an overall length of 307 feet (93.6 m), a beam of 38 feet 7 inches (11.8 m) and a mean deep draught of 12 feet 4 inches (3.8 m). She was powered by a pair of vertical triple-expansion steam engines, each driving one propeller shaft, using steam provided by two Admiralty three-drum boilers. The engines developed a total of 5,500 indicated horsepower (4,100 kW) which gave a maximum speed of 20 knots (37 km/h; 23 mph). The ship carried 730 long tons (740 t) of fuel oil that gave it a range of 9,500 nautical miles (17,600 km; 10,900 mi) at 12 knots (22 km/h; 14 mph). Her main armament was a single 4-inch (102 mm) Mk V dual-purpose gun. The ship's anti-aircraft armament consisted of four 2-pounder (40 mm) Mk VIII "pom-pom" in a quadruple mount and six 20 mm (0.8 in) Oerlikon guns in two twin powered mounts and two single hand-operated mounts. For anti-submarine work, Transvaal was fitted with a pair of triple-barrelled Squid anti-submarine mortars and 15 depth charges delivered by one rail and two throwers. The ship was equipped with Type 144 and 147B ASDIC and a Type 277 surface-search radar. Her crew numbered 114 officers and ratings.

When Transvaal began her long refit in 1957, her main armament was replaced by a twin-gun turret fitted with more powerful four-inch Mk XVI guns. In addition her anti-aircraft guns were replaced by a water-cooled, twin-gun Mk V mount for 40 mm (1.6 in) Bofors AA guns in the position formerly occupied by the "pom-pom" mount, a pair of single 40 mm guns where the twin-gun 20 mm were and another pair of 40 mm guns on the quarterdeck. Her radar and radios were also upgraded. During a later refit in 1962, the ship's forecastle deck was extended to accommodate trainees.

== Construction and career ==
Transvaal was ordered from Harland & Wolff on 2 May 1943 and was laid down on 20 January 1944 at their shipyard in Belfast, Northern Ireland. She was launched on 2 August and commissioned on 14 May 1945. The ship was originally named Loch Ard, but was renamed by the South Africans after it was transferred by the British while building. Transvaal was completed a week later after having fitted out at Lobnitz & Co.'s dockyard at Renfrew, Scotland. After working up at HMS Western Isles in Tobermory, Mull, she sailed for home and reached Table Bay on 28 July.

Transvaal and her sister ships Natal and Good Hope repatriated some 700 troops from Egypt between November 1945 and March 1946 and escorted the battleship HMS Vanguard while she was serving as the royal yacht during King George VI's tour of South Africa in 1947. At the end of the year, Transvaal's captain, Lieutenant-Commander John Fairbairn, read the proclamation annexing the Prince Edward Islands. All three sisters toured ports in Portuguese West Africa and the Belgian Congo in August–September 1948. A few months later, Transvaal rescued survivors from the tanker Esso Wheeling whilst sailing from Durban to Simon's Town to begin a brief refit. In February 1949 the ship towed the disabled coastal steamer SS Pequena from the South Atlantic to Cape Town. Two years later, she represented South Africa during the celebrations of Australia's Golden Jubilee in Sydney and then participated in exercises with other Commonwealth. warships. In 1955, Transvaal surveyed Gough Island to determine its suitability for a weather station.

The ship began a lengthy refit at Simon's Town Naval Dockyard on 11 September 1957 and was recommissioned on 24 August 1960. After the eruption of Queen Mary's Peak on Tristan da Cunha on 10 October 1961, Transvaal ferried a team of scientists from the Royal Geographical Society to investigate conditions on the island in January 1962. Later that year her machinery was overhaul in Cape Town and she was mostly used for training and fishery protection duties. The ship's starboard propeller shaft broke in December 1963 and she returned home on a single shaft. Transvaal was taken out of service on 14 August 1964 and laid up in Simon's Town. She was sold for scrap for R6,500, together with her sister Good Hope, in 1977. After stripping her of all valuable metals and fittings, the ship's hulk was donated to the False Bay Conservation Society for use as an artificial reef and she was scuttled on 3 August 1978 in False Bay.

The wreck lies upright on the sand at a depth of about 34 metres (112 ft) at coordinates approximately 34°16′S 18°28′E. The wreck is starting to collapse, the bow has broken off, and a permit is required to dive on the site.

== See also ==
- Shipwrecks of Cape Town
