= HMSAS Natal =

Loch-class frigate in the South African Navy

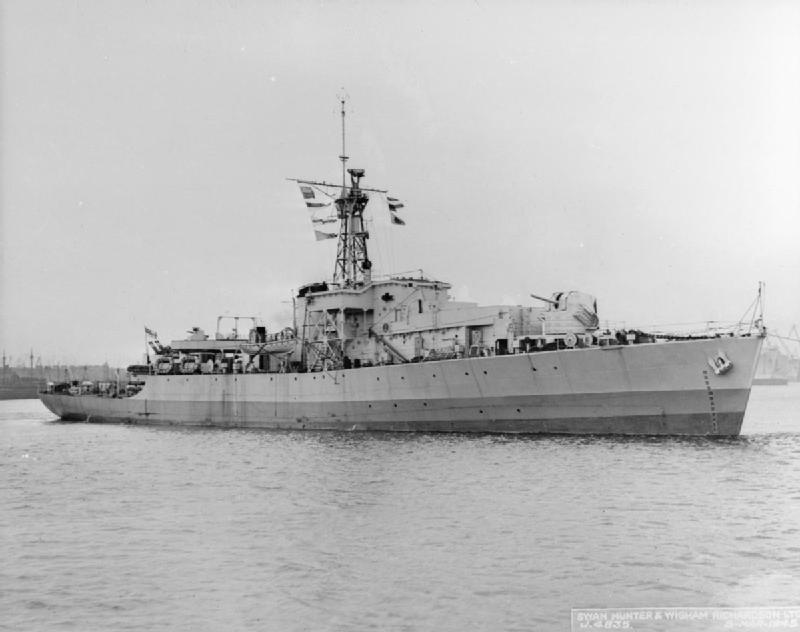
- Natal fitting out, 5 March 1945

History

United Kingdom
- Name: Loch Cree
- Ordered: 13 February 1943
- Builder: Swan Hunter & Wigham Richardson, Wallsend
- Laid down: 18 October 1943
- Launched: 19 June 1944
- Fate: Transferred to the South African Navy, 1944

South Africa
- Name: Natal
- Namesake: Natal Province
- Completed: 8 March 1945
- Acquired: 1944
- Commissioned: 1 March 1945
- Decommissioned: 1972
- Out of service: 15 March 1972
- Fate: Sunk as target 19 September 1972

General characteristics (as built)
- Class & type: Loch-class frigate
- Displacement: 1,435 long tons (1,458 t) (standard load); 2,260 long tons (2,300 t) (deep load)
- Length: 307 ft (93.6 m)
- Beam: 38 ft 7 in (11.8 m)
- Draught: 12 ft 4 in (3.8 m)
- Installed power: 2 Admiralty 3-drum boilers; 5,500 ihp (4,100 kW)
- Propulsion: 2 shafts; 2 × vertical triple-expansion steam engines
- Speed: 20 knots (37 km/h; 23 mph)
- Range: 9,500 nmi (17,600 km; 10,900 mi) at 12 knots (22 km/h; 14 mph)
- Complement: 114
- Sensors & processing systems: Types 144 and 147B ASDIC; Type 277 surface-search radar
- Armament: 1 × single QF 4-inch Mark V; 1 × quadruple 2-pounder (40 mm) "pom-pom" AA gun; 2 × twin, 2 × single 20 mm (0.8 in) Oerlikon AA guns; 2 × triple-barrelled Squid anti-submarine mortars; 1 × rail, 2 × throwers for 15 depth charges

HMSAS Natal (pennant number: K10) was one of three Loch-class frigates in the South African Navy (SAN). It was built as HMS Loch Cree (K430) for the Royal Navy during World War II, but was transferred to the SAN before completion in 1945 and renamed as HMSAS Natal. Just hours after finishing fitting out, the ship sank a German submarine off the coast of Scotland in early 1945. It was assigned convoy escort duties for the remaining few months of the war in Europe. Natal had her anti-aircraft armament reinforced for service in the Far East after arriving in South Africa in June. In September–October, the ship participated in the reoccupation of British Malaya before returning home the following month.

It was assigned to ferry troops home from Egypt afterwards and participated in the annexation of the Prince Edward Islands in late 1947. Together with her sister ships, Natal made port visits in Middle Africa in 1948. It was placed in reserve in 1953 and was converted into a survey ship during the mid-1950s. The ship participated in the 1957–58 International Geophysical Year and the 1962–63 International Indian Ocean Expedition. Natal was obsolete by 1972 and was sunk as a target that year.

== Description ==
Natal displaced 1,435 long tons (1,458 t) at standard load and 2,260 long tons (2,300 t) at deep load. The ship had an overall length of 307 feet (93.6 m), a beam of 38 feet 7 inches (11.8 m) and a mean deep draught of 12 feet 4 inches (3.8 m). It was powered by a pair of vertical triple-expansion steam engines, each driving one propeller shaft, using steam provided by two Admiralty three-drum boilers. The engines developed a total of 5,500 indicated horsepower (4,100 kW) which gave a maximum speed of 20 knots (37 km/h; 23 mph). The ship carried 730 long tons (740 t) of fuel oil that gave it a range of 9,500 nautical miles (17,600 km; 10,900 mi) at 12 knots (22 km/h; 14 mph). Its main armament was a single 4-inch (102 mm) Mk V dual-purpose gun. Its anti-aircraft armament consisted of four 2-pounder (40 mm) Mk VIII "pom-pom" in a quadruple mount and six 20 mm (0.8 in) Oerlikon guns in two twin powered mounts and two single hand-operated mounts. For anti-submarine work, Natal was fitted with a pair of triple-barrelled Squid anti-submarine mortars and 15 depth charges delivered by one rail and two throwers. The ship was equipped with Type 144 and 147B ASDIC and a Type 277 surface-search radar. Its crew numbered 114 officers and ratings.

To prepare the ship for the threat posed by Japanese kamikaze suicide aircraft, the ship's anti-aircraft armament was strengthened. The twin Oerlikon mounts were replaced by a pair of 40 mm (1.6 in) Bofors light AA guns, another pair were added on the quarterdeck and the existing single 20 mm mounts were repositioned on the quarterdeck. Natal reverted to her previous armament upon her return to South Africa in late 1945. As part of the conversion into a survey ship in 1954–55, it was disarmed and its interior was remodelled to include a drawing office for nautical charts and a combined laboratory and darkroom. The ship was also fitted for oceanographic work and could accommodate four scientists.

== Construction and career ==
Natal was built by Swan Hunter & Wigham Richardson at its shipyard in Wallsend, laid down on 18 October 1943, launched on 19 June 1944 and commissioned on 1 March 1945. The ship was originally named Loch Boisdale, but was renamed by the South Africans after it was transferred by the British while fitting out. En route to HMS Western Isles in Tobermory, Mull, for working up, it sank the German submarine U-714 on 14 March, only four hours after having left its builder's shipyard. Natal was assigned to the 8th Escort Group of the Western Approaches Command; it encountered another U-boat on 26 April, but equipment failures prevented a successful attack. It was then refitted for tropical duties before sailing for South Africa on 6 June 1945 with its sister ship, Good Hope, with 29 ex-prisoners of war aboard the sisters. They arrived in Table Bay on 30 June, and Natal continued onward to Durban where it was formally adopted by Natal Province on 12 July.

The ship's anti-aircraft armament was significantly augmented in preparation for service against the Japanese before she departed on 20 August. In September–October, it escorted convoys in and around Malaya and Singapore before it was tasked to replace the light cruiser HMS Nigeria as guardship at Sabang, Sumatra. After several weeks there, Natal was ordered home and departed on 23 October. The ship and her sisters Good Hope and Transvaal repatriated some 700 troops from Egypt between November 1945 and March 1946 and escorted the battleship HMS Vanguard while it was serving as the royal yacht during King George VI's tour of South Africa in 1947. At the end of the year, it participated in the annexation of the Prince Edward Islands. All three sisters toured ports in Portuguese West Africa and the Belgian Congo in August–September 1948. The ship was reduced to reserve at Simon's Town in 1953.

It began a lengthy conversion into a hydrographic survey ship in September 1956 at the Simon's Town Naval Dockyard that was completed on 25 October 1957. The ship sailed to the 54th parallel south a few months later as part of her contribution to the 1957–58 International Geophysical Year and made 11 cruises from April 1962 to February 1963 as part of the International Indian Ocean Expedition. Natal assisted in the search for survivors from the Greek tanker World Glory which had foundered in heavy weather on 13 July 1968. Natal was obsolete by 1972 and was taken out of service on 15 March. The ship was sunk as a target off the Cape of Good Hope by gunfire from the frigate President Steyn and depth charges dropped by Avro Shackleton maritime patrol aircraft of the South African Air Force on 19 September 1972.
