= Southern Cross Medal (1952) =

- Type: Military decoration for merit
- Awarded for: Outstanding devotion to duty
- Country: South Africa
- Presented by: the Monarch of the United Kingdom and the Commonwealth realms and, from 1961, the State President
- Eligibility: All ranks until 1967; Officers from 1967
- Post-nominals: SM
- Status: Discontinued in 1975
- Established: 1952
- First award: 1960
- Ribbon bar

Precedence
- Next (higher): SADF precedence: Medical Service Cross; SANDF precedence: Medical Service Cross
- Next (lower): SADF succession: Pro Merito Medal (1967); SANDF succession: Pro Merito Medal (1967)

The Southern Cross Medal of 1952, post-nominal letters SM, is a South African military decoration which was instituted by the Union of South Africa in 1952. It was awarded for outstanding devotion to duty and was originally available to all ranks, but from 1967 until July 1975, when it was discontinued, it was reserved for officers.

== The South African military ==
The Union Defence Forces (UDF) were established in 1912 and renamed the South African Defence Force (SADF) in 1958. On 27 April 1994, it was integrated with six other independent forces into the South African National Defence Force (SANDF).

== Institution ==
The Southern Cross Medal of 1952, post-nominal letters SM, was instituted by Queen Elizabeth II on 6 April 1952, during the Tercentenary Van Riebeeck Festival.

== Award criteria ==
The Southern Cross Medal could be awarded to members of the South African Defence Force for outstanding devotion to duty. From 1952 to 1967, the award could be made to all ranks, until an equivalent award for other ranks, the Pro Merito Medal, was introduced in 1967 and the award of the Southern Cross Medal was restricted to officers.

The first awards were made on the occasion of the fiftieth anniversary of the Union of South Africa in 1960.

== Order of wear ==
With effect from 6 April 1952, when the Southern Cross Medal and several other new decorations and medals were instituted, these new awards took precedence before all earlier British orders, decorations and medals awarded to South Africans, with the exception of the Victoria Cross, which still took precedence before all other awards. The other older British awards continued to be worn in the order prescribed by the British Central Chancery of the Orders of Knighthood.

The position of the Southern Cross Medal of 1952 in the official order of precedence was revised three times after 1975, to accommodate the inclusion or institution of new decorations and medals, first upon the integration into the South African National Defence Force on 27 April 1994, again in April 1996, when decorations and medals were belatedly instituted for the two former non-statutory forces, the Azanian People's Liberation Army and Umkhonto we Sizwe, and finally upon the institution of a new set of awards on 27 April 2003, but it remained unchanged on all three occasions.

Official SANDF order of precedence

- Preceded by the Medical Service Cross (CC) of the Republic of South Africa.
- Succeeded by the Pro Merito Medal (1967) (PMM) of the Republic of South Africa.

Official national order of precedence

- Preceded by the Medical Service Cross (CC) of the Republic of South Africa.
- Succeeded by the Pro Merito Medal (1967) (PMM) of the Republic of South Africa.

== Description ==
With the royal cypher

Obverse

The Southern Cross Medal of 1952 is a medallion struck in silver, 38 millimetres in diameter and 3 millimetres thick, depicting the stars of the Southern Cross against a dark blue enameled background, framed in a circle of oak leaves.

Reverse

The reverse has the pre-1994 South African coat of arms. Specimens which were struck before South Africa became a republic in 1961, have Queen Elizabeth's royal cypher (E II R) above the coat of arms. The decoration number was impressed at the bottom of the decoration on the rim.

Ribbon

The ribbon is 32 millimetres wide with a 13 millimetres wide dark blue band, one orange and one white band, both 3 millimetres wide, and a 13 millimetres wide dark blue band.

== Discontinuation ==
Conferment of the decoration was discontinued in respect of services performed on or after 1 July 1975, when the Southern Cross Medal (1975) was instituted to replace it.

== Recipients ==
Some officers were awarded both versions of the Southern Cross Medal. One example is Vice-Admiral Lambert Jackson Woodburne DVR SD SM, former Chief of the Navy. In such cases, the post-nominal letters "SM" is used once only.
