= Engineer School =

Engineer School may refer to:

- Republic of Korea Army Engineer School
- South African Army Engineer School
- United States Army Engineer School

== See also ==
- Engineering education
- Grande école, a specialized top-level educational institution in France and some other countries
- Sapper, a combat engineer
