= 1 Special Service Battalion =

- SANDF 1 Special Service Battalion emblem
- Active: 1 May 1933 – present
- Country: South Africa
- Branch: South African Army
- Type: Armoured
- Part of: South African Armoured Formation
- Garrison/HQ: Tempe 29°05′0″S 26°11′0″E
- Nickname: 1 SSB 1 SDB
- Motto: Eendrag Maakt Mag (Unity is Strength)
- Colors: Orange over Blue which must be divided by Silver and where it is not possible to use silver white will be used in place
- Equipment: Ratel IFV; Rooikat
- Engagements: World War II; South African Border War; Operation Boleas; Operation Merlyn (1989) (Note: As part of 63 Mechanised Battalion Group); Operation Agree (1989)
- Website: www.saarmour.co.za

Commanders
- Notable commanders: Lt Col George Brink; Lt Col CEG (Papa) Britz; Lt Col WHE Poole; Lt Col HB Klopper; Lt Col Bok Kriel; Gen Jannie Geldenhys (Note: Later Chief, SADF); Lt Col. W.R. Van Der Riet (Note: Later Lieutenant General)

Insignia
- Cap Badge: A spray of three protea flowers, bound by a ribbon bearing the initials and motto
- Beret Colour: Black
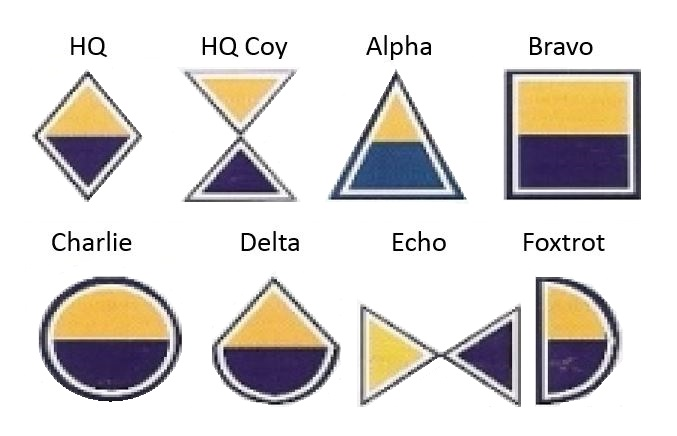
- Armour Squadron emblems

- Armour beret bar c. 1992

1 Special Service Battalion (usually abbreviated to 1SSB) is an armoured regiment of the South African Army and only one of two such in its regular force. The Regiment is based at Tempe near Bloemfontein.

It was previously known in Afrikaans as 1 Spesiale Diens Bataljon (1 SDB).

== History ==
1 Special Service Battalion

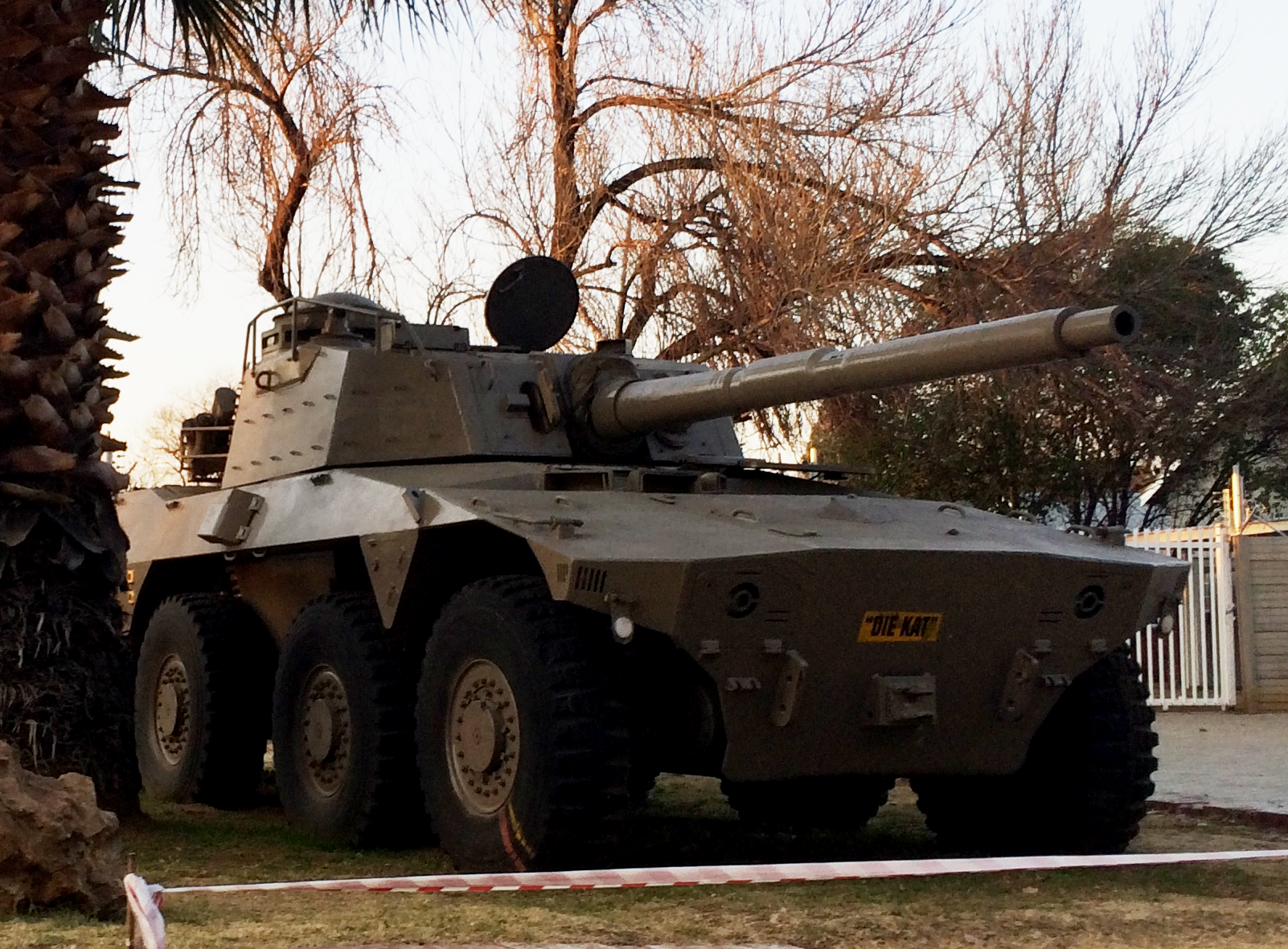
Rooikat at the entrance to 1SSB, Bloemfontein.

Following World War II, the Special Service Battalion was re-organised into 2 battalions - 1 Special Service Battalion and 1 South African Infantry Battalion.

When the South African Armoured Corps was thus officially proclaimed in 1946 and Special Service Battalion was included in the corps as the only full-time unit, its symbols and colours were incorporated.

1 SSB also took part in the South African Border War, serving in South-West Africa and Angola.

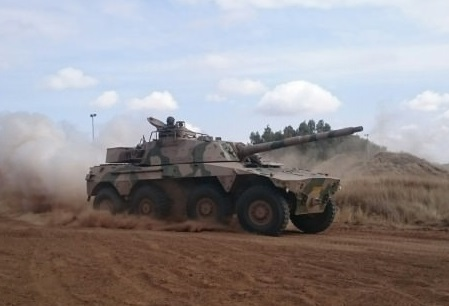
Rooikat Armoured Car

More recently, the unit also took part in Operation Boleas, which was a South African intervention in its neighbouring country of Lesotho in 1998.

1 SSB had a sister unit for a number of years in the post-World War II era, designated 2 Special Service Battalion, which was based in the town of Zeerust. This unit has now been disbanded.

1 SSB also detached squadrons to various battlegroups in the South West African campaign

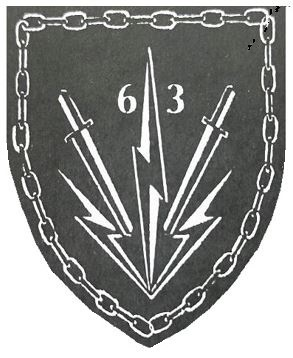
63 Mech Battlegroup to which 1 SSB detached elements

== Equipment ==
=== pre 1995 ===
| Variant | Description | Comment | Image |
|---|---|---|---|
| Eland 60 | South Africa | 60 mm (2.4 in) Mortar platform | Eland 60 Armoured Car |
| Eland 90 | South Africa | 90 mm (3.5 in) Fire support platform and assault gun | Eland 90 armoured car |

=== Current ===
The regiment is equipped primarily with Ratel infantry fighting vehicles and Rooikat armoured cars.

| Variant | Description | Comment | Image |
|---|---|---|---|
| Rooikat 76 | South Africa | 76 mm (3.0 in) cannon | Rooikat Armoured Car 105mm |
| Ratel 90 | South Africa | 90 mm (3.5 in) cannon | Ratel 90mm |
| Ratel ZT3 | South Africa | antitank missile | Ratel IFC ZT3 |

=== Future ===
Under Project Hoefyster, the SANDF will eventually replace the Ratel family of vehicles with the Badger system. Five versions are contemplated of which two are earmarked for 1 SSB:

- Missile (turreted Denel ZT3 Ingwe)
- Fire Support (turreted 30 mm (1.2 in) cannon, but with more ammunition than the section vehicle)

| Variant | Description | Comment | Image |
|---|---|---|---|
| Denel Badger various types | South Africa | Various armaments | IFV earmarked for replacement of the Ratel Fleet 2016 onwards |

== Regimental symbols ==
- The cap badge is a spray of three protea flowers, bound by a ribbon bearing the initials and motto.
- Regimental motto: Eendrag Maakt Mag (English: Unity is Strength)
- Regimental communications icon :
- Regimental deployment strength : 1,000 soldiers
- Regimental honour roll : Soldiers who died during active combat duty and soldiers who died during training.
- Regimental traditional contact meeting : Pantseraksie (Armour Action), once a year

=== Previous Dress Insignia ===
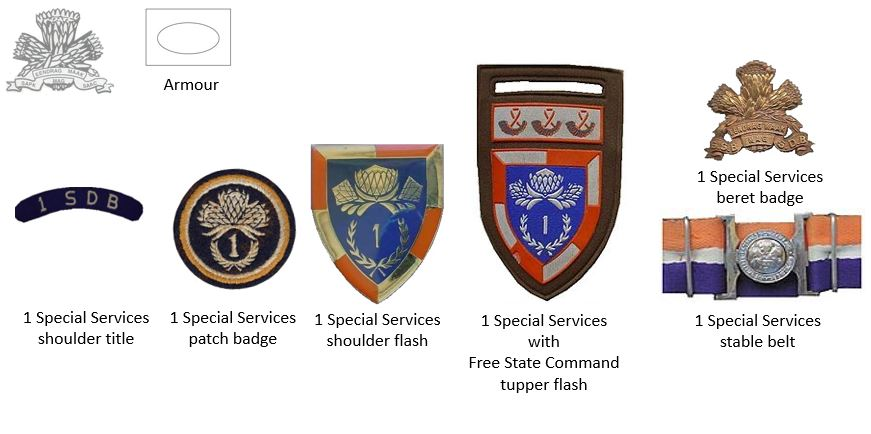
SADF era 1 Special Services Battalion insignia

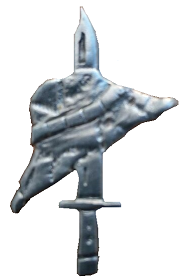
SADF era Operation Hooper participation bar

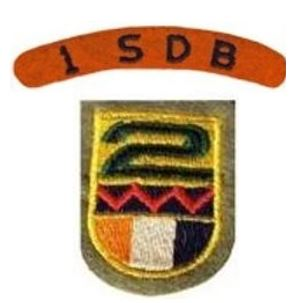
SADF era 1 SSB D Squadron with 2 SAI insignia

=== Current Dress Insignia ===
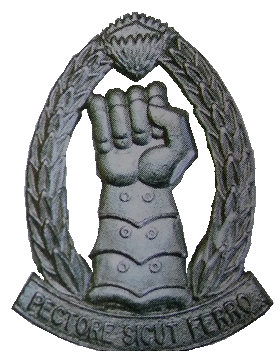
SANDF Armoured Formation beret badge circa 1996 forward

== Leadership ==
1 Special Services Battalion Leadership
| From | Commanding Officers | To | Ribbon |
|---|---|---|---|
| May 1933 | Lt. Col. GE Poole DSO | Nov 1933 | Distinguished Service Order DSO |
| Dec 1933 | Lt. Col. P de Waal | Jan 1934 | |
| Feb 1934 | Lt. Col. William John Evered Poole CB,CBE,DSO,KStJ,LOM (Note: Later Major General) (Note: Later Deputy Chief of General Staff) | Apr 1935 | Order of the Bath CB Order of the British Empire CBE Distinguished Service Order DSO Venerable Order of Saint John KStJ Legion of Merit LOM Legion of Honour Croix de guerre 1914–1918 |
| May 1935 | Lt. Col. J Danie | Jan 1936 | |
| Feb 1936 | Maj. JR Wocke | Dec 1937 | |
| Jan 1938 | Lt. Col. HB Klopper DSO (Note: Later General) (Note: Later Commandant General of the Union Defence Force) | Sep 1939 | Distinguished Service Order DSO |
| Oct 1939 | Lt. Col. HP van Noorden | Dec 1939 | |
| Jan 1940 | Lt. Col. GCA van Dam | Jun 1940 | |
| Jun 1940 | Lt. Col. CEG (Papa) Brits DSO | Aug 1946 | Distinguished Service Order DSO |
| Sep 1946 | Lt. Col. GN Nauhaus OBE | May 1949 | Order of the British Empire OBE |
| Jun 1949 | Maj. EE Fodred MC | Aug 1949 | Military Cross MC |
| Sep 1949 | Maj. PE Ferguson MC | Jan 1951 | Military Cross MC |
| Feb 1951 | Cmdt. CS Leisegang DSO | Sep 1953 | Distinguished Service Order DSO |
| Oct 1953 | Cmdt Werndly van der Riet SSA,SM,MC (Note: Later Chief of Defence Staff) | Dec 1960 | Star of South Africa SSA Southern Cross Medal SM Military Cross MC |
| Jan 1961 | Cmdt. S Hugo SM | Jun 1963 | Southern Cross Medal SM |
| Jul 1963 | Cmdt. JJ Wahl MC | Oct 1964 | Military Cross MC |
| Nov 1964 | Cmdt. JR Dutton SSAS,SD,SM,MMM (Note: Later Chief of Staff Operations) | Nov 1967 | Star of South Africa SSAS Southern Cross Decoration SD Southern Cross Medal SM Military Merit Medal MMM |
| Dec 1967 | Cmdt. WH Matthews SM | Nov 1968 | Southern Cross Medal SM |
| Dec 1968 | Cmdt. MB Anderson | May 1969 | |
| Apr 1969 | Cmdt. WC Meyer | Sep 1972 | |
| Oct 1972 | Cmdt. PJ Schalkwyk | Jul 1973 | |
| Aug 1973 | Maj. AJ Snyman (Note: Acting (Temporarily holding the post without confirmation)) | Nov 1973 | |
| Nov 1973 | Cmdt. APR Carstens | Nov 1976 | |
| Dec 1976 | Cmdt Reginald Otto SD & Bar,SM,MMM (Note: Later Chief of the South African Army) | Dec 1979 | Southern Cross Decoration SD & Bar Southern Cross Medal SM Military Merit Medal MMM |
| Jan 1980 | Cmdt. FA Botha | Nov 1981 | |
| Dec 1981 | Cmdt. AJ van Niekerk | Nov 1983 | |
| Dec 1983 | Cmdt. HT Heinze | Nov 1986 | |
| December 1986 | Cmdt. AJ Kriel | May 1989 | |
| Jun 1989 | Cmdt. AJ van Jaarsveld | Nov 1989 | |
| Dec 1989 | Cmdt Chris Gildenhuys SM,MMM (Note: Later Brigadier General) (Note: Later GOC South African Army Armoured Formation) | Dec 1993 | Southern Cross Medal SM Military Merit Medal MMM |
| Jan 1994 | Col. GM Louw HC,MMM | unk | Honoris Crux (1975) HC Military Merit Medal MMM |
| From | Regimental Sergeants Major | To | Ribbon |
| May 1933 | RSM J Whammond MC,DCM,MM | Feb 1934 | Military Cross MC Distinguished Conduct Medal DCM Military Medal MM |
| Mar 1934 | RSM LJ van den Heever | May 1934 | |
| Jun 1934 | RSM BS Scheepers | May 1935 | |
| Jun 1935 | RSM SP Conje | Jun 1935 | |
| Sep 1936 | RSM CEG Brits | Mar 1937 | |
| Apr 1937 | RSM JO van Blommenstein | May 1940 | |
| Jun 1940 | RSM JW Hamilton | Jan 1943 | |
| Feb 1943 | WO1 S du Plessis MC | Aug 1946 | Military Cross MC |
| Sep 1946 | WO1 WE Wocke | Oct 1951 | |
| Nov 1950 | WO1 S du Plessis MM | Sep 1953 | Military Medal MM |
| Oct 1953 | WO1 WJ van der Merwe SM | Dec 1965 | Southern Cross Medal SM |
| Jan 1966 | WO1 BJP Ehlers PMM | Oct 1972 | Pro Merito Medal PMM |
| Nov 1972 | WO1 MA Booyens PMM,MMM | Sep 1976 | Pro Merito Medal PMM Military Merit Medal MMM |
| Oct 1976 | WO1 JP. O'Neill | Nov 1978 | |
| Dec 1978 | WO1 PH Rohrbeck PMM | Jan 1979 | Pro Merito Medal PMM |
| Feb 1979 | WO1 GDF van Baalen PMM,MMM | Nov 1984 | Pro Merito Medal PMM Military Merit Medal MMM |
| Jun 1984 | WO1 IJ Prinsloo | Nov 1988 | |
| Dec 1988 | WO1 WF Snyman PMM,MMM | Nov 1993 | Pro Merito Medal PMM Military Merit Medal MMM |
| Dec 1993 | WO1 JAB van Zyl | nd | |
| From | Chaplains | To | Ribbon |
| Dec 1987 | Lt Heerden van Niekerk (Note: Reverend (Dominee)) (Note: Dutch Reformed Church (Afrikaans: Nederduitse Gerformeerde Kerk)) | Dec 1988 | |

== Alliances ==
- United Kingdom - 1st The Queen's Dragoon Guards

== Battle honours ==
Battle Honours
List of Battle Honours for 1 SSB
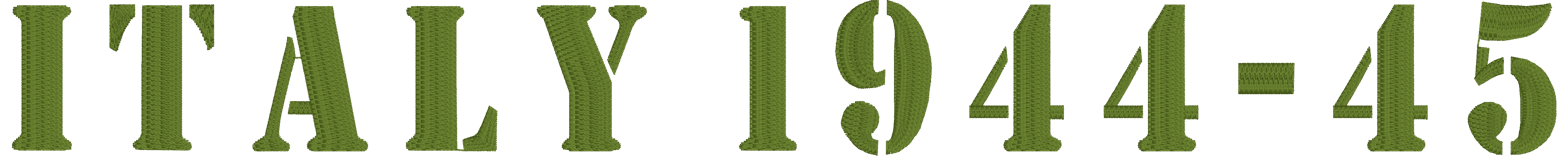
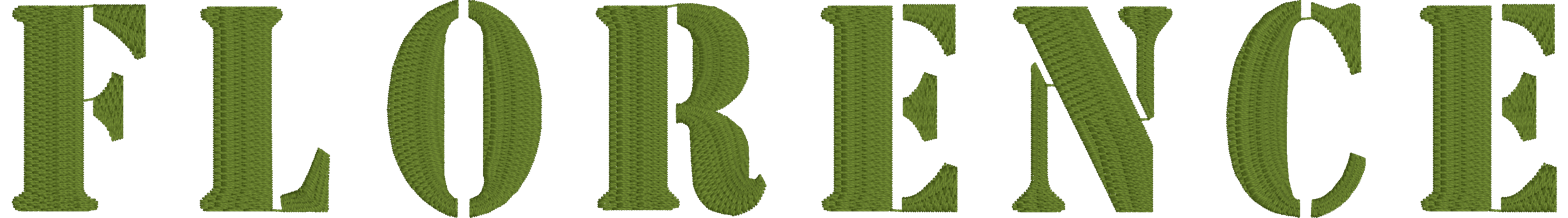
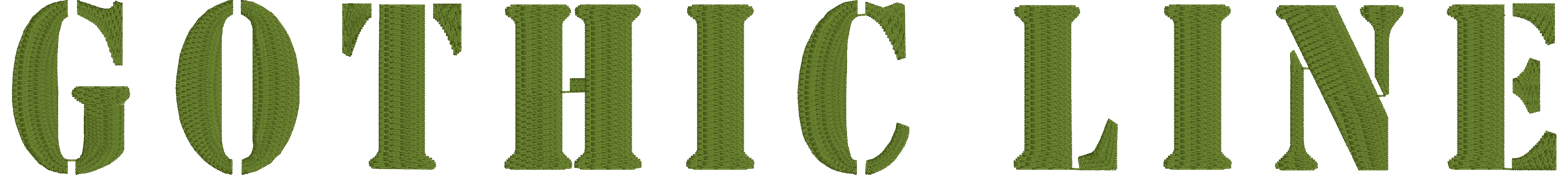
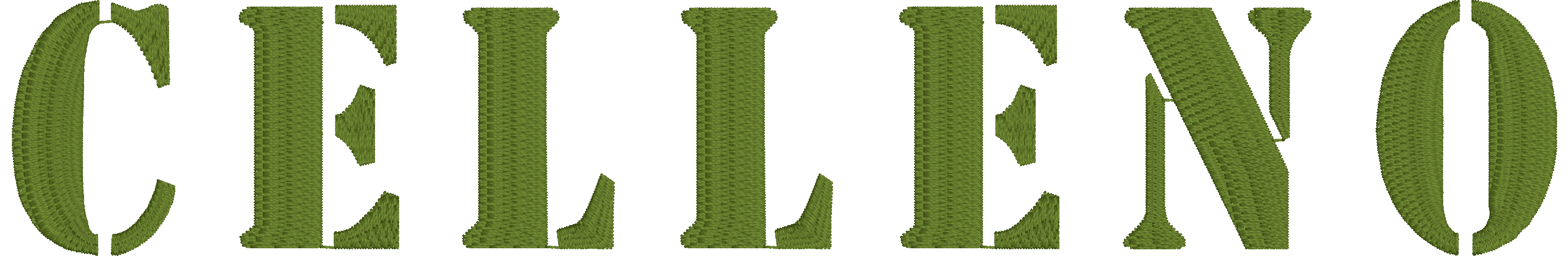
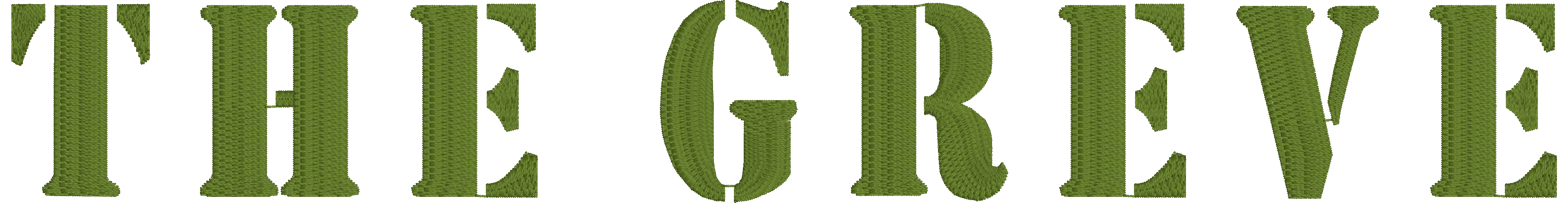
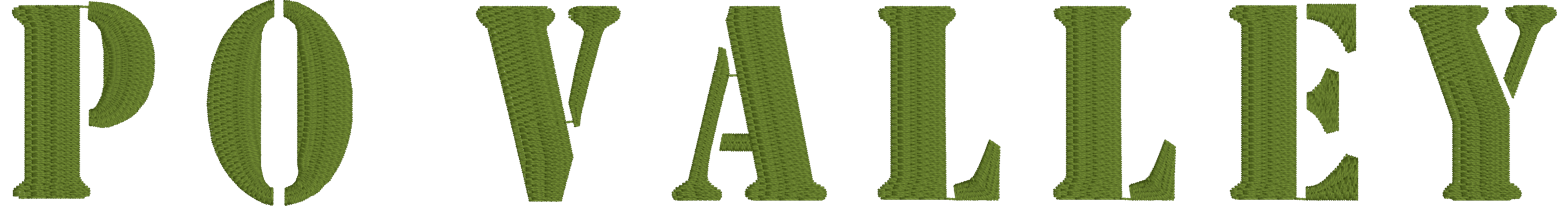
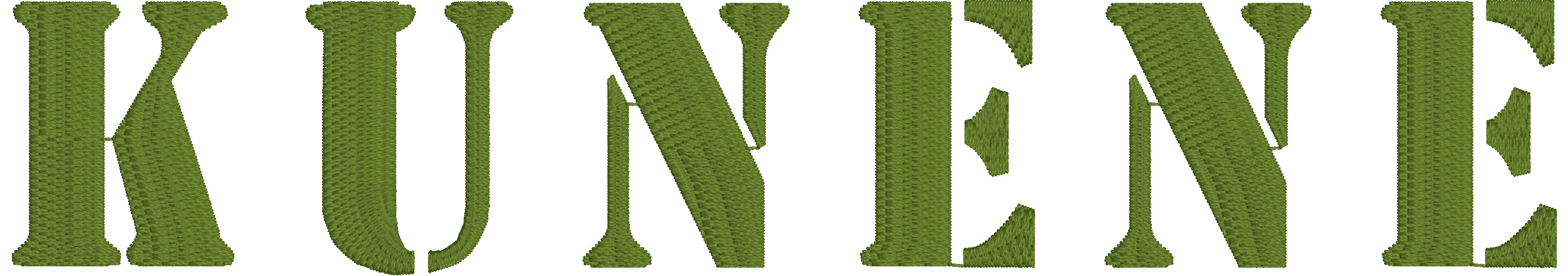
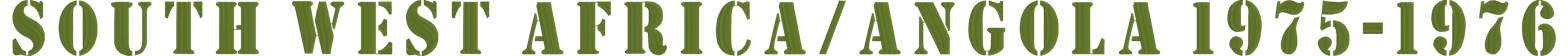
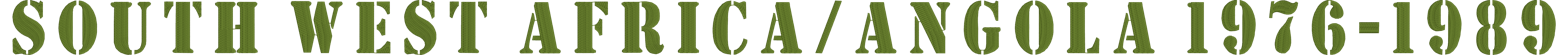
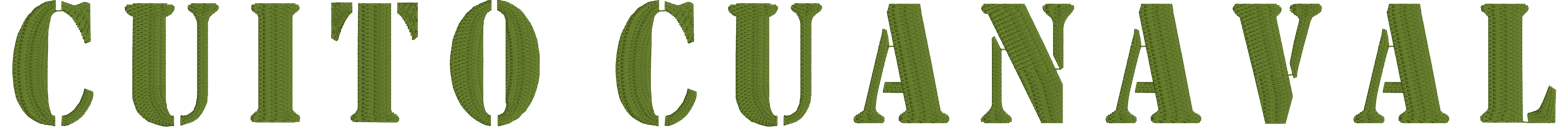

== Future ==
Under Project Hoefyster the battalion is expected to receive Badger infantry fighting vehicles in missile and fire-support variants (see Equipment above).

In the draft South African Army Vision 2020 force design, the 2007 organograms published with Leon Engelbrecht's unpublished manuscript A Guide to the SANDF chart 1 SSB as the armoured car regiment of the Armoured Brigade (Free State) within the Mechanised Division (headquarters Wallmansthal), alongside 1 SA Tank Regiment and the paired reserve tank regiment (Pretoria Regiment / Regiment President Steyn), with 1 SAI as the brigade's mechanised infantry.

== See also ==
South African Armoured Corps
