= Wolmarans =

Wolmarans is a surname from the Alsace-Lorraine region in France. Today the surname is mostly found in South Africa and was brought there by Joseph Wolmarans (Sources quote Wolmerans). Joseph Wolmarans arrived in Cape Town circa 1746 as a soldier for the Dutch East India Company and records show that he is from Strasbourg in Alsace, France. The surname is a latinised form of a Allemani surname meaning "son of famous wolf", which refers to a warrior or leader. Later he held a wine and brandy license in Rondebosch, Cape Town, South Africa.

People with that name include:

- Senator Andreas Daniel Wynand Wolmarans (Danie Wolmarans, 1857–1928). He was a Senator in the Union of South Africa as well as many years before a Secretary of State for the Zuid-Afrikaanse Republiek. In the latter capacity, he traveled with a South African delegation asking for help to among others, America, Russia, Germany, the Netherlands, Belgium and Switzerland. He was a close advisor to President Paul Kruger in the later stages of the Second Boer War (1899–1902).
- Hendrik Petrus Wolmarans (1912–1982), South African Land Surveyor.
- Fritz Wolmarans (born 1986), South African tennis player
- Maria Magdalene "Ria" Wolmarans (died 1996), South African murder victim of Mariëtte Bosch
- Mariëtte Wolmarans (born Mariëtte Bosch, 1950–2001), South African murderer
- Nick Wolmarans (1916–94), South African boxer
- Willie Wolmarans (active 1992–93), South African Army officer

== See also ==
- Wolmaransstad, a town in North West Province, South Africa founded by Jacobus M. A. Wolmarans
- Wolmaransstad Commando, a former light infantry regiment of the South African Army based in Wolmaransstad
