= Chris Gildenhuys =

South African Army officer

Brigadier General Burgert Christiaan Gildenhuys SM MMM
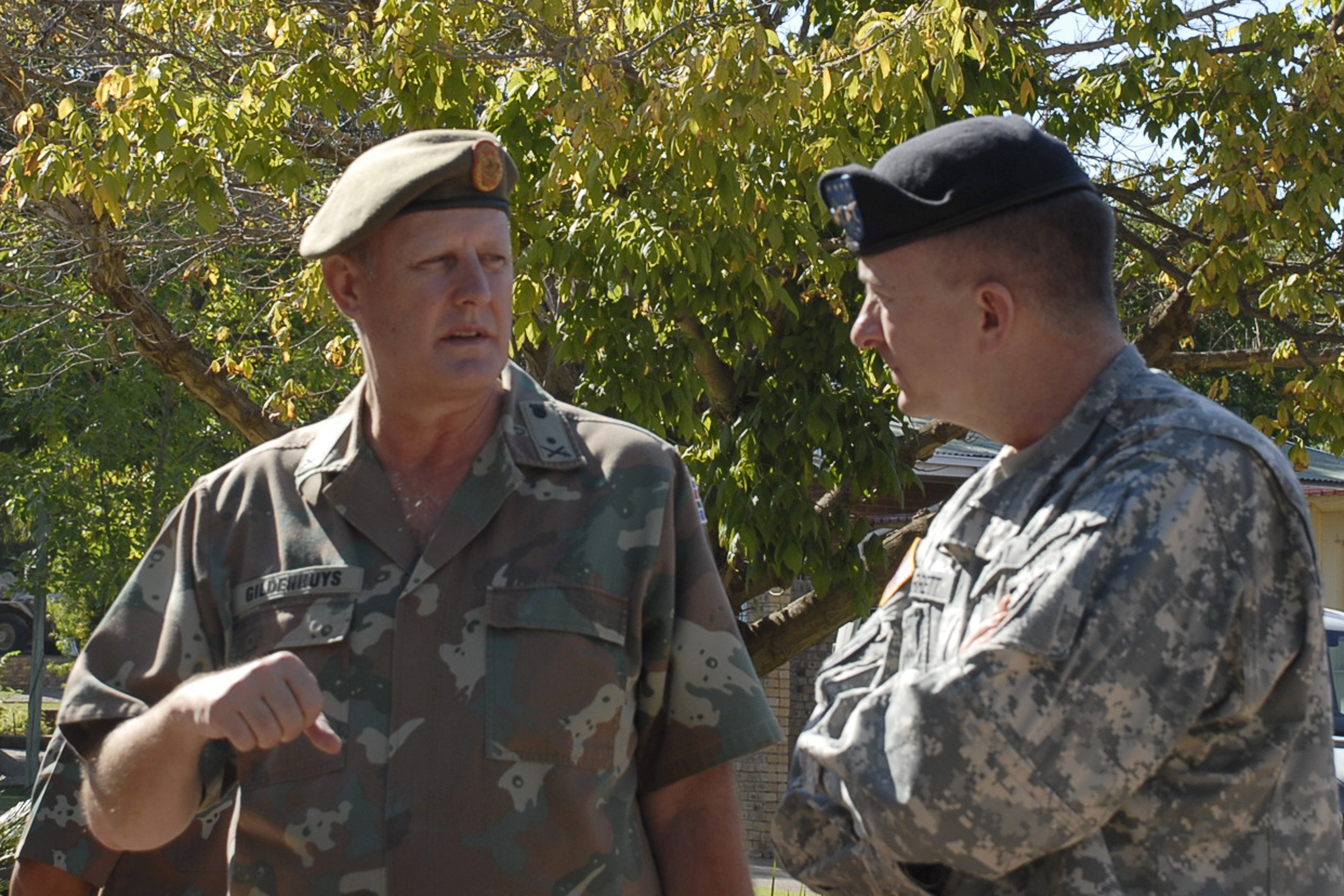
- Gildenhuys (left)
- Military career
- Allegiance: South Africa
- Branch: South African Army
- Service years: 1975 – 31 October 2016
- Rank: Brigadier General
- Commands: South African Army Armoured Formation 1 January 2000 – 24 January 2014; 1 Special Service Battalion 1990 – 1993; School of Armour 1994 – 1996
- Awards: Southern Cross Medal SM Military Merit Medal MMM

Brigadier General Chris Gildenhuys SM MMM is a South African Army officer.

== Military career ==
On 24 January 2014 he handed over command of the South African Army Armoured Formation to Brig Gen Andre Retief. He was transferred to the Joint Operations Division as Director of Operations from 25 January 2014 where he served until his retirement.

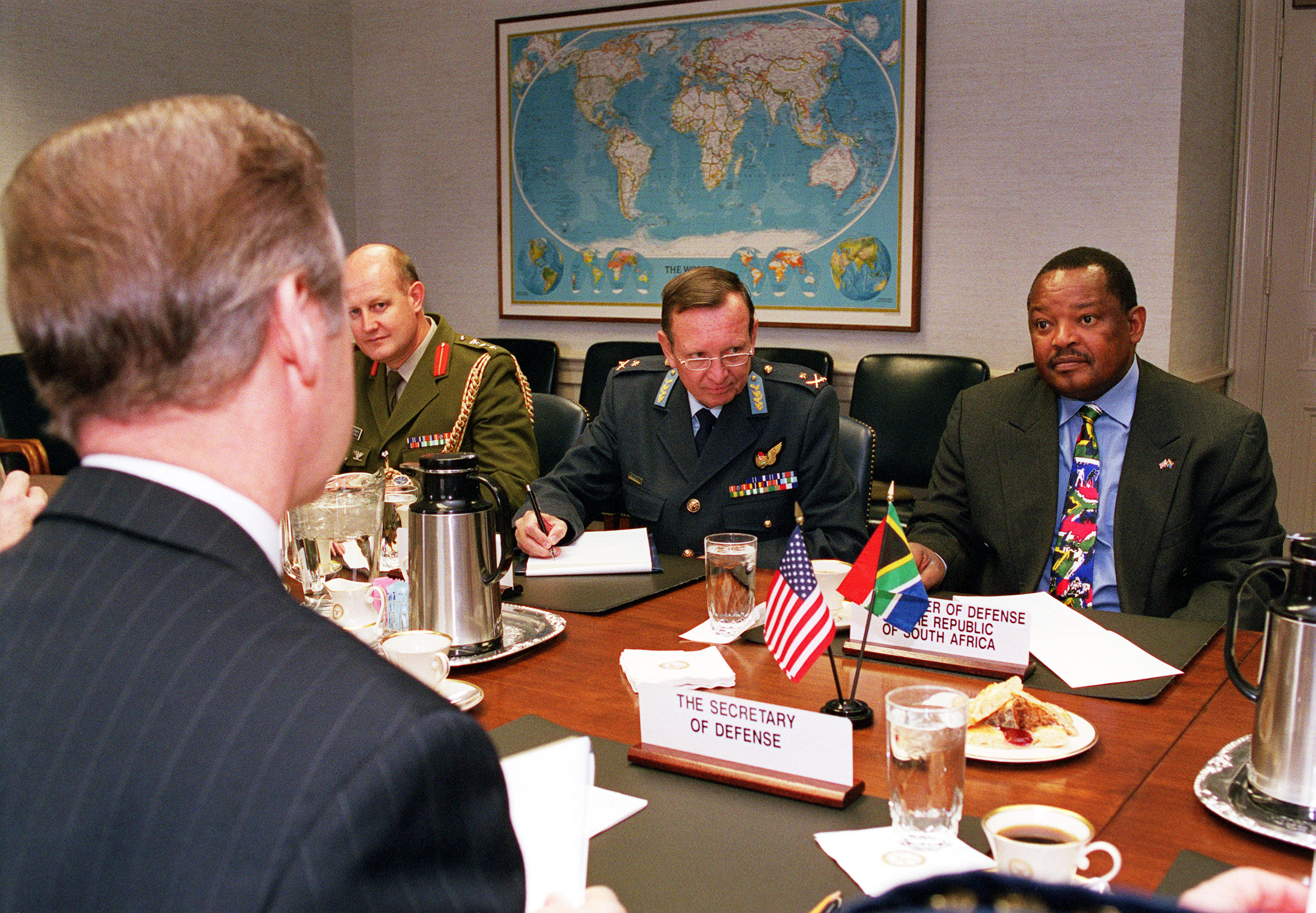
Gildenhuys while an Attache

He served as a Military Attache in Washington from 1997 to 1999.

Gen Gildenhuys retired from the SA Army on the 31 October 2016.

== Awards and decorations ==
- Southern Cross Medal (1975) (SM)
- Military Merit Medal (MMM)
- Pro Patria Medal
- Southern Africa Medal
- General Service Medal (South Africa)
- Unitas (Unity) Medal
- Medalje vir Troue Diens (Medal for Loyal Service) (30 Year Clasp)
- Good Service Medal (Silver (20 Years))
- Good Service Medal (Bronze (10 Years))
- Legion of Merit (Officer) (LOM)

61 Mech Operational Service Badge (Service)
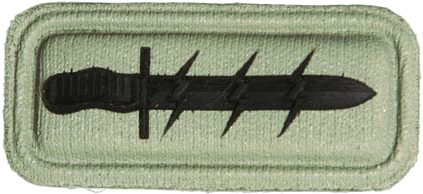
Black on Thatch beige, Embossed. Rectangular bar (upright) with a black dagger and three black lightning flashes angled diagonally across the blade

Military offices
Preceded by Cmdt. AJ van Jaarsveld	Commanding Officer 1 Special Service Battalion; 1990–1993	Succeeded by Col Gerhard Louw HC MMM
Unknown	Officer Commanding School of Armour; 1994–1996	Succeeded by Col Andre Retief
Preceded by Les Rudman	Military Attache to the USA; 1997–1999	Unknown
Preceded by Col Henro Grobler as Director Armour	GOC South African Army Armoured Formation; 1 January 2000–24 January 2014	Succeeded by Brig Gen Andre Retief
Unknown	Director:Operations - Joint Operations Division SANDF; 25 January 2014–2016	Succeeded by Brig Gen Kwezi Nompetsheni
