= Andre Retief =

South African Army officer

Brigadier General Andre Retief SM & Bar MMM
- Born: 4 September 1961; Louis Trichardt
- Died: 13 July 2020 (aged 58)
- Military career
- Allegiance: South Africa
- Branch: South African Army
- Service years: 1979–2018
- Rank: Brigadier General
- Commands: South African Army Armoured Formation
- Awards: Southern Cross Medal SM Military Merit Medal MMM Pro Patria Medal Southern Africa Medal General Service Medal (South Africa) Unitas (Unity) Medal Medalje vir Troue Diens (Medal for Loyal Service) Good Service Medal

Brigadier General Andre Retief SM & Bar MMM was a South African Army officer.

== Military career ==
On 24 January 2014 he took over command of the South African Army Armoured Formation from Brig Gen Chris Gildenhuys.

He was succeeded by Fezile Mbotyi on 1 September 2018 and retired.
He died on 13 July 2020.

== Awards and decorations ==
61 Mech Operational Service Badge (Service)
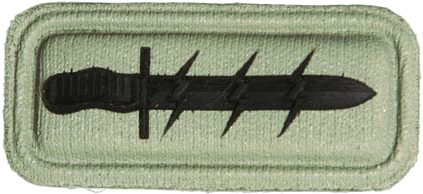
Black on Thatch beige, Embossed. Rectangular bar (upright) with a black dagger and three black lightning flashes angled diagonally across the blade

- Southern Cross Medal (1975) (SM)
- Military Merit Medal (MMM)
- Pro Patria Medal
- Southern Africa Medal
- General Service Medal (South Africa)
- Unitas (Unity) Medal
- Medalje vir Troue Diens (Medal for Loyal Service) (30 Year Clasp)
- Good Service Medal (Bronze (10 Years))
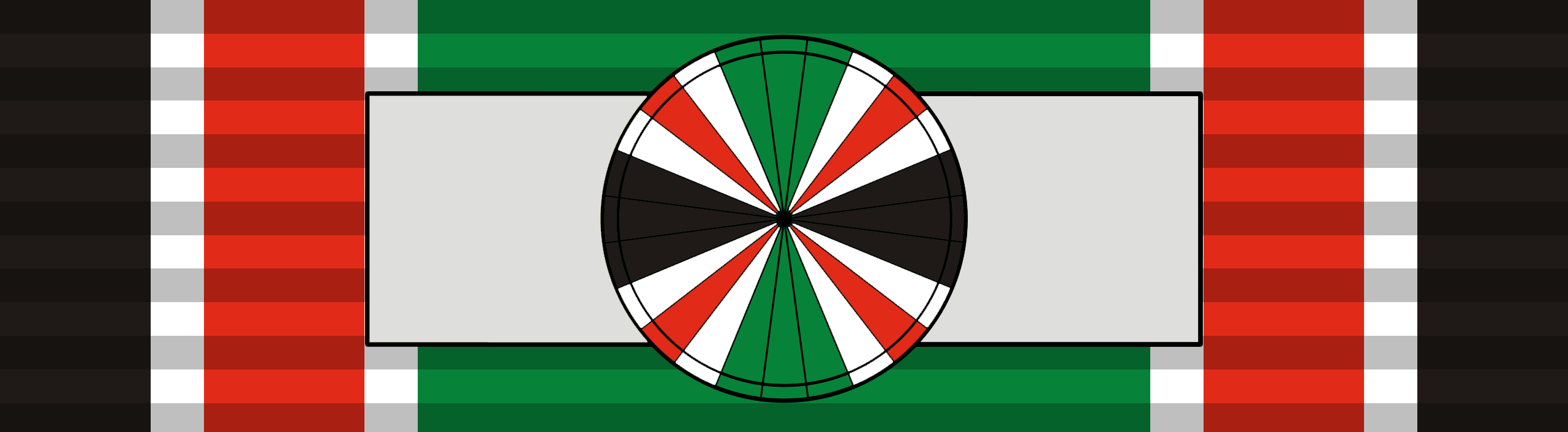
- Commander of the Order of Military Merit (Jordan)

Military offices
Preceded by Chris Gildenhuys	GOC South African Army Armour Formation; 24 January 2014 – 31 August 2018	Succeeded by Fezile Mbotyi
