= Thaba Bosiu Armour Regiment =

Regiment President Steyn Thaba Bosiu Armour Regiment
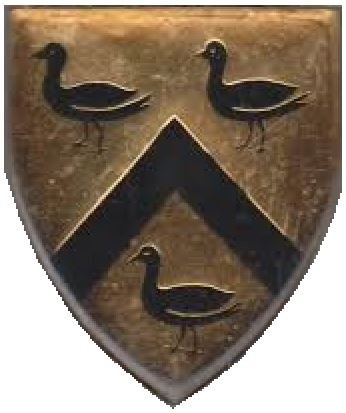
- SANDF Regiment President Steyn Emblem
- Active: 1934–
- Country: South Africa
- Allegiance: Republic of South Africa; Republic of South Africa
- Branch: South African Army; South African Army
- Type: Armoured Regiment
- Part of: South African Armoured Formation; Army Conventional Reserve
- Garrison/HQ: Bloemfontein
- Mottos: Vryheid, Getrouheid, Moed (Freedom; Faithfulness; Courage)
- Equipment: Olifant main battle tank
Battle honours
Battle Honours
Awarded
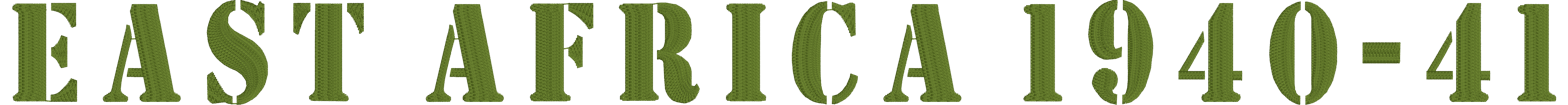

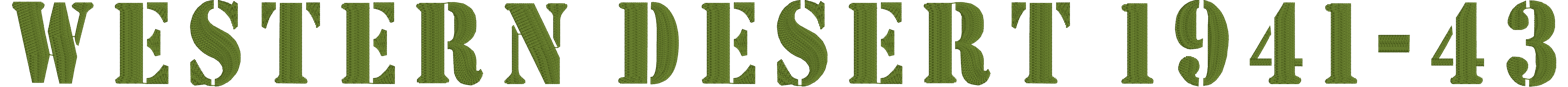

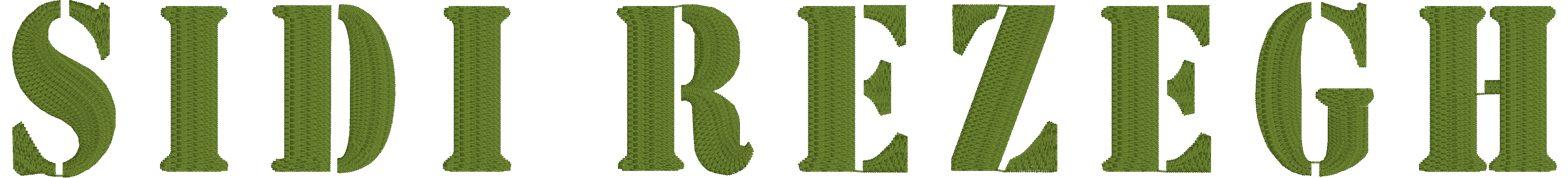

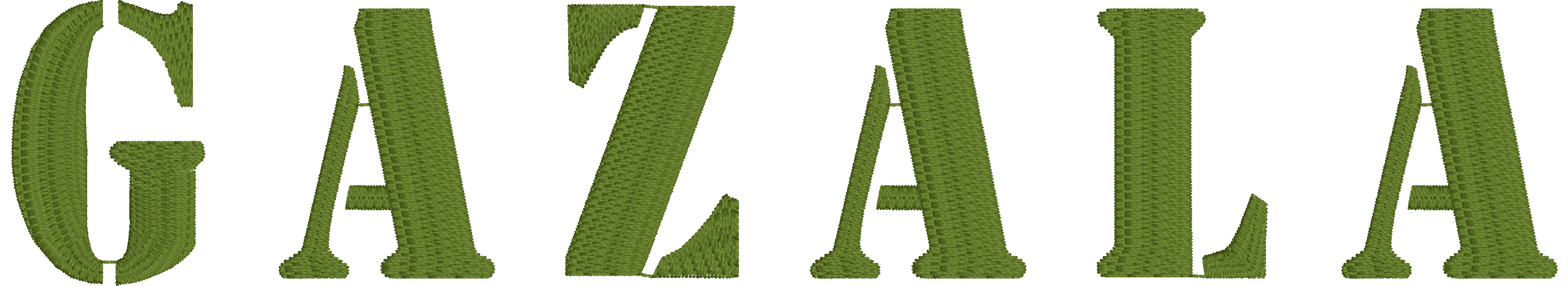

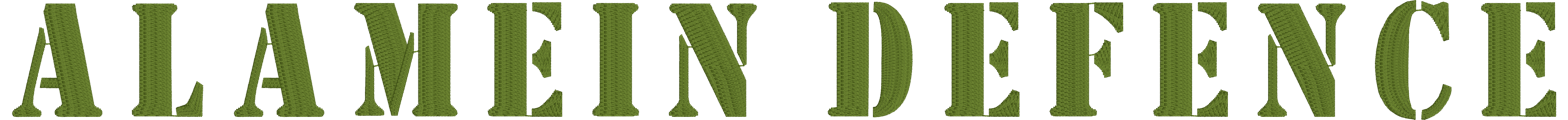

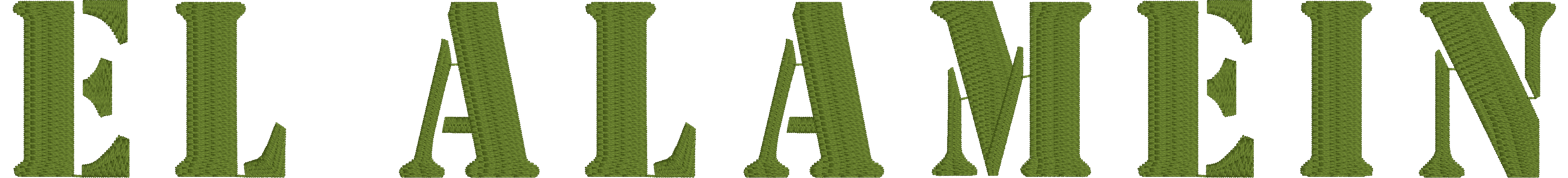

Insignia
- Beret Colour: Black
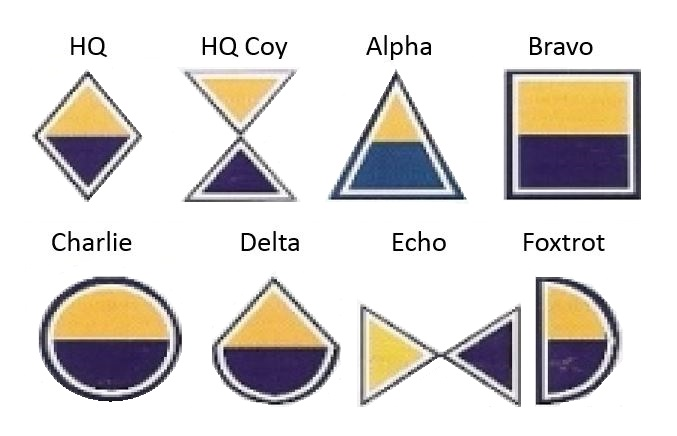
- Armour Squadron emblems

- Armour beret bar circa 1992
- Abbreviation: TBAR

The Thaba Bosiu Armour Regiment (formerly Regiment President Steyn) is a reserve armoured regiment of the South African Army.

== History ==
=== SADF 1994 Onward ===
During Gibson's tenure the Regiment was awarded the “General Winner Personnel Administration” shield consecutively from 1995 to 1997.

On 1 April 1997 Lt Col Gibson handed over command to Lt Col André de Beer when Regiment Vrystaat (RVS) re-joined the Regiment after 21 years.

=== Name Change ===
In August 2019, 52 Reserve Force units had their names changed to reflect the diverse military history of South Africa. Regiment President Steyn became the Thaba Bosiu Armour Regiment, and have 3 years to design and implement new regimental insignia.

=== Role ===
Thaba Bosiu Armour Regiment is a Reserve Force tank regiment of the South African Army Armoured Formation.

In the draft South African Army Vision 2020 force design, the 2007 organograms published with Leon Engelbrecht's unpublished manuscript A Guide to the SANDF chart the unit (then titled Regiment President Steyn) together with Pretoria Regiment as a tank regiment in the Armoured Brigade (Free State) of the Mechanised Division (headquarters Wallmansthal), alongside 1 SA Tank Regiment, 1 SSB (armoured cars) and 1 SAI (mechanised infantry).

== Regimental symbols ==
- Regimental Colour: The badge is a Vickers machine gun with the arms of the late President Steyn and Floreat above it and the title and Bloemfontein below. The flash is yellow above white with black as the lowest panel, and a black triangle on the centre white.

=== Previous Dress Insignia ===
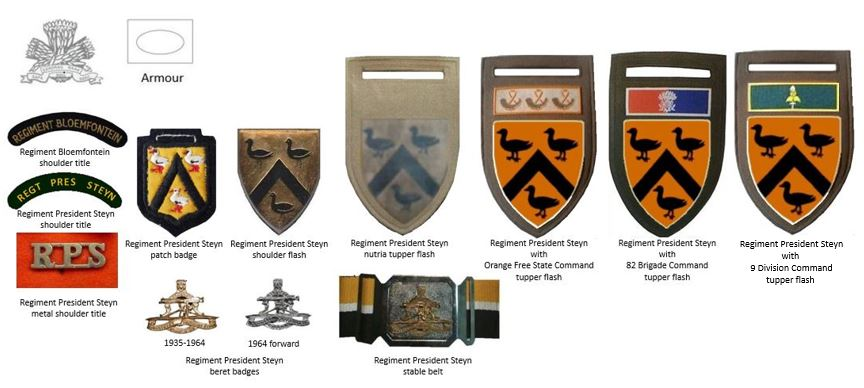
SADF era Regiment President Steyn insignia

== Unit colours ==
The regiment's first Unit Colour was a gift from the City Council of Bloemfontein and the wife of the late President M.T. Steyn presented it to the Unit on 17 October 1939. The RPS also became the first unit to receive the Right to the Freedom of Entry to the City of Bloemfontein. The date of this honour was 1 April 1955.

== Battle honours ==
Battle Honours
Awarded to the Thaba Bosiu Armour Regiment
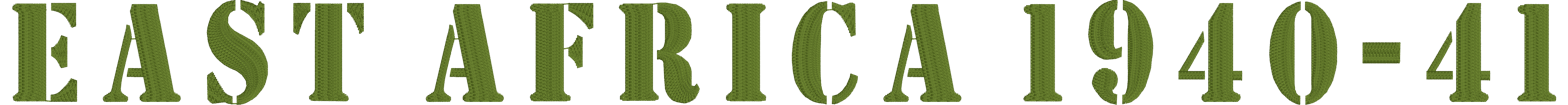
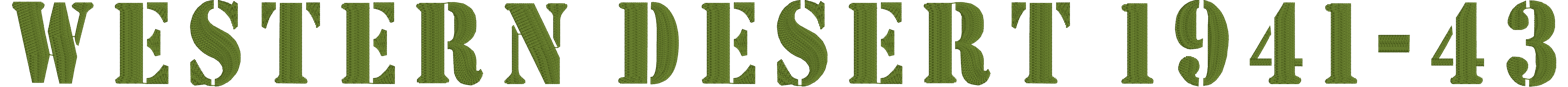
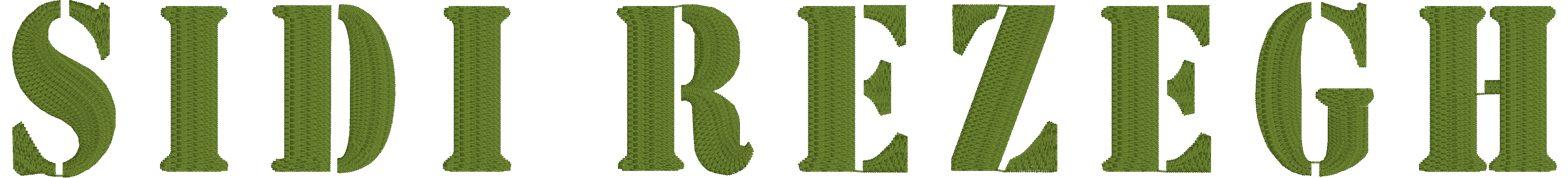
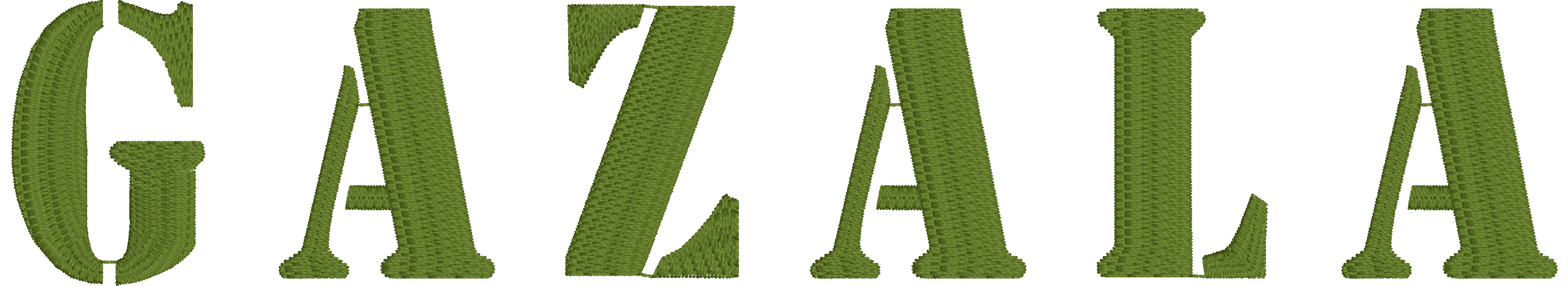
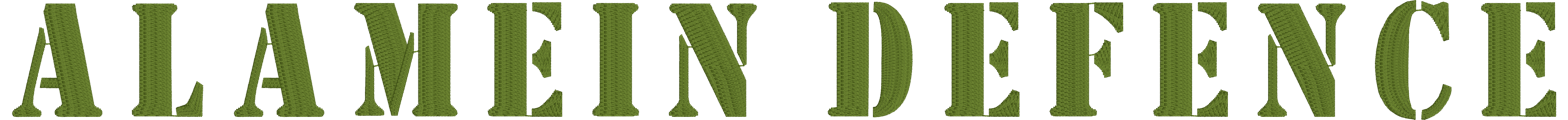
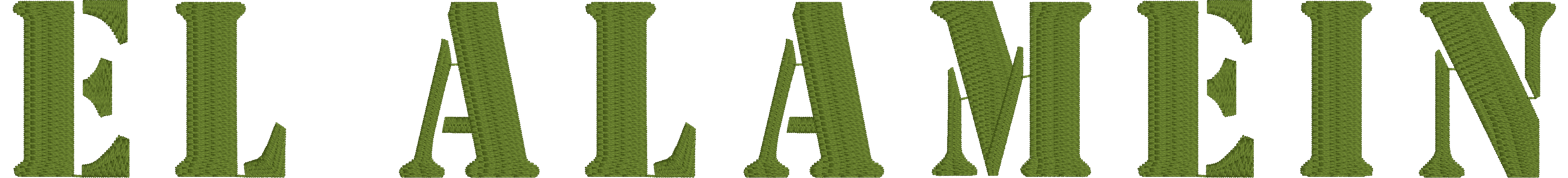

- East Africa 1940 – 1941
- Western Desert 1941 – 1943
- Sidi Rezegh
- Gazala
- Alamein Defence
- El Alamein

== Operational Duty during the Border War ==
- South West Africa:

1980 Ruacana: In support of Op Sceptic 1983 Oshivello: Op Robyn 1983 Tsinsabis: Op Phoenix 1988 Oshivello: Op Prone

- Angola:

1987 Op Moduler & Op Hooper 1988 Op Packer
