= 1 South African Tank Regiment =

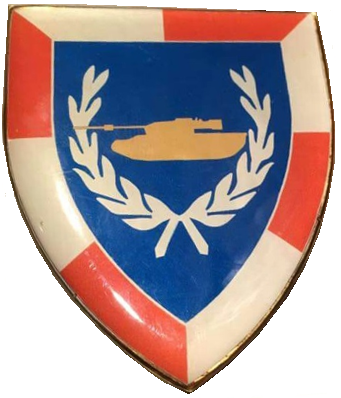
- SANDF 1 SA Tank Regiment emblem
- Active: 1999 to present
- Country: South Africa
- Branch: South African Army
- Type: Armoured Regiment
- Part of: South African Armoured Formation
- Garrison/HQ: Tempe, Bloemfontein
- Motto: We make the rules.
- Equipment: Olifant Mk.2 main battle tank

Commanders
- 2nd OC: Lt Colonel William Nondala
- OC 2012: Lt Colonel W.O. Jansen

Insignia
- Beret Colour: Black
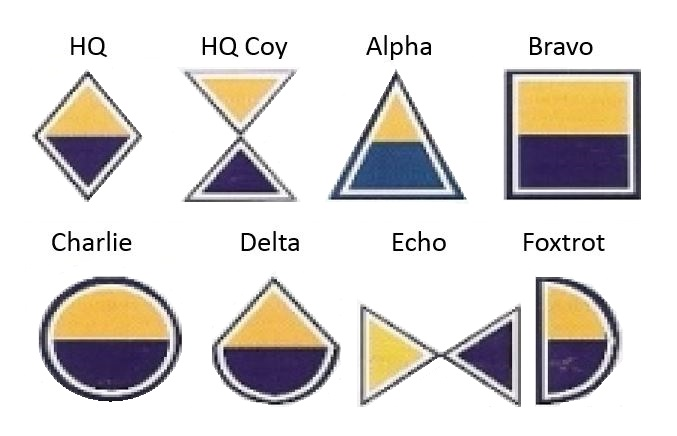
- Armour Squadron emblems

- Armour beret bar circa 1992

1 South African Tank Regiment is an armoured regiment of the South African Army, based at the Tempe military base in Bloemfontein as part of the South African Army Armour Formation.

== History ==
=== Origin ===
The Regiment was established in April 1999, composed of members of the old Tank Wing of the National Defence Force's School of Armour.

Lt Col William Nondala, the second CO, was the first black commanding officer appointed in the country's Armoured Corps.

=== Role ===
This unit supplies the only full-time tank force to the SA Army.

In the draft South African Army Vision 2020 force design, the 2007 organograms published with Leon Engelbrecht's unpublished manuscript A Guide to the SANDF chart 1 SA Tank Regiment as a tank regiment in the Armoured Brigade (Free State) of the Mechanised Division (headquarters Wallmansthal), alongside a paired reserve tank regiment (Pretoria Regiment / Regiment President Steyn), 1 SSB as the brigade armoured-car regiment, and 1 SAI as mechanised infantry.

== Equipment and Operations ==
The unit trains jointly with the reserve force units to enhance the ‘one force’ concept, because the reserve force is the expansionary capability of the SANDF in times of national defence. There is however only a small percentage of active reserves, because training call-ups are limited, due to budgetary constraints.

There were 724 available posts, but only 335 were staffed and 389 vacant in 2005. The highest shortage level (75%) was experienced at the level of trooper.

It is equipped with the Olifant Mk.2 main battle tank. The unit's structure is a ‘type 38 regiment’, with 2 tanks at regimental headquarters and 12 tanks each in the three operational squadrons. There are also support squadrons and tank transport squadrons.

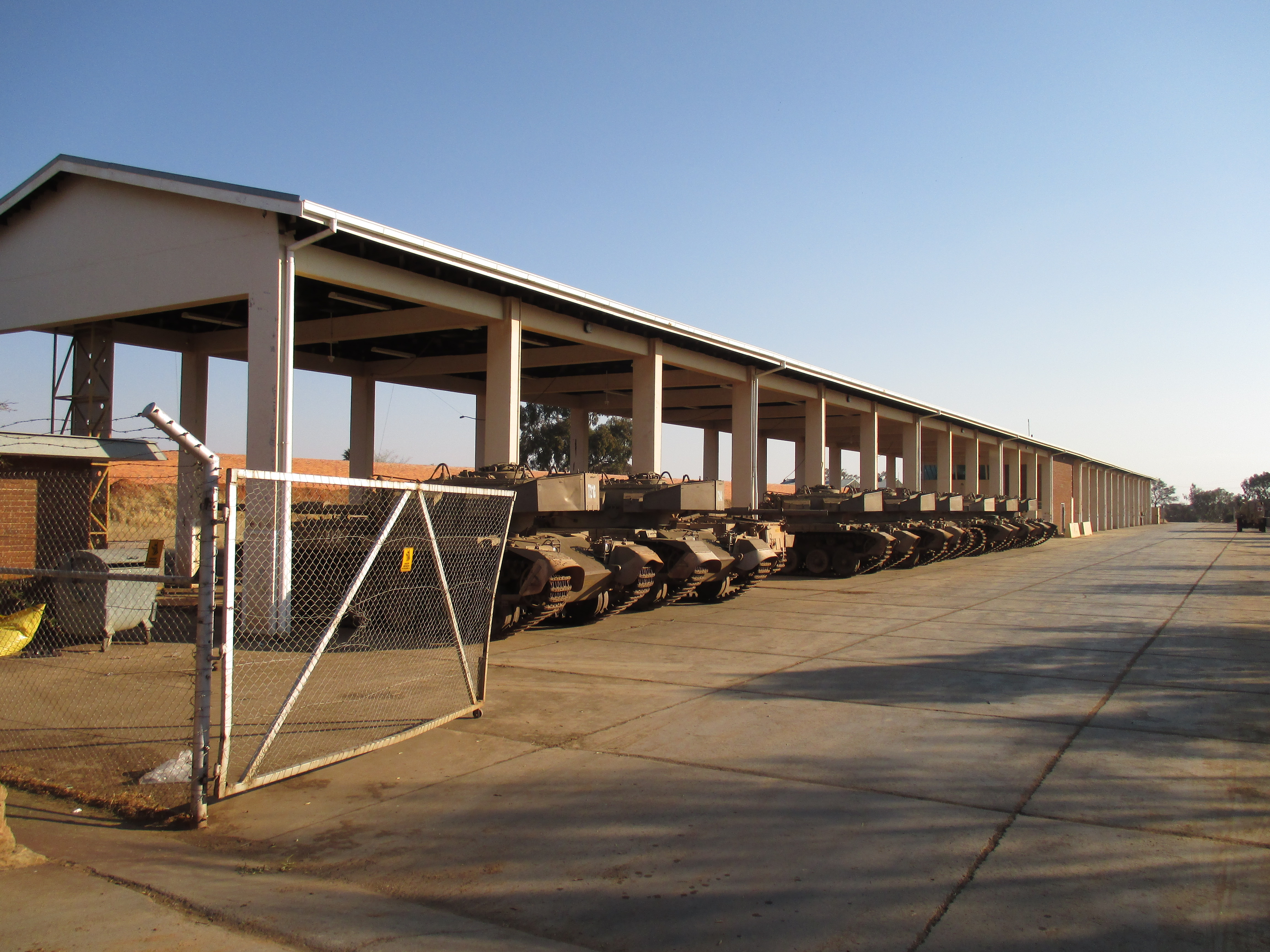
Olifants parked at 1 Tank Regiment, Tempe

The Olifant tanks have been significantly upgraded with new power packs and stabilized night vision equipment. The vehicles are also capable of fire on the move manoeuvres. The Olifants may be replaced with a small number of new Main Battle Tanks some time after 2018.

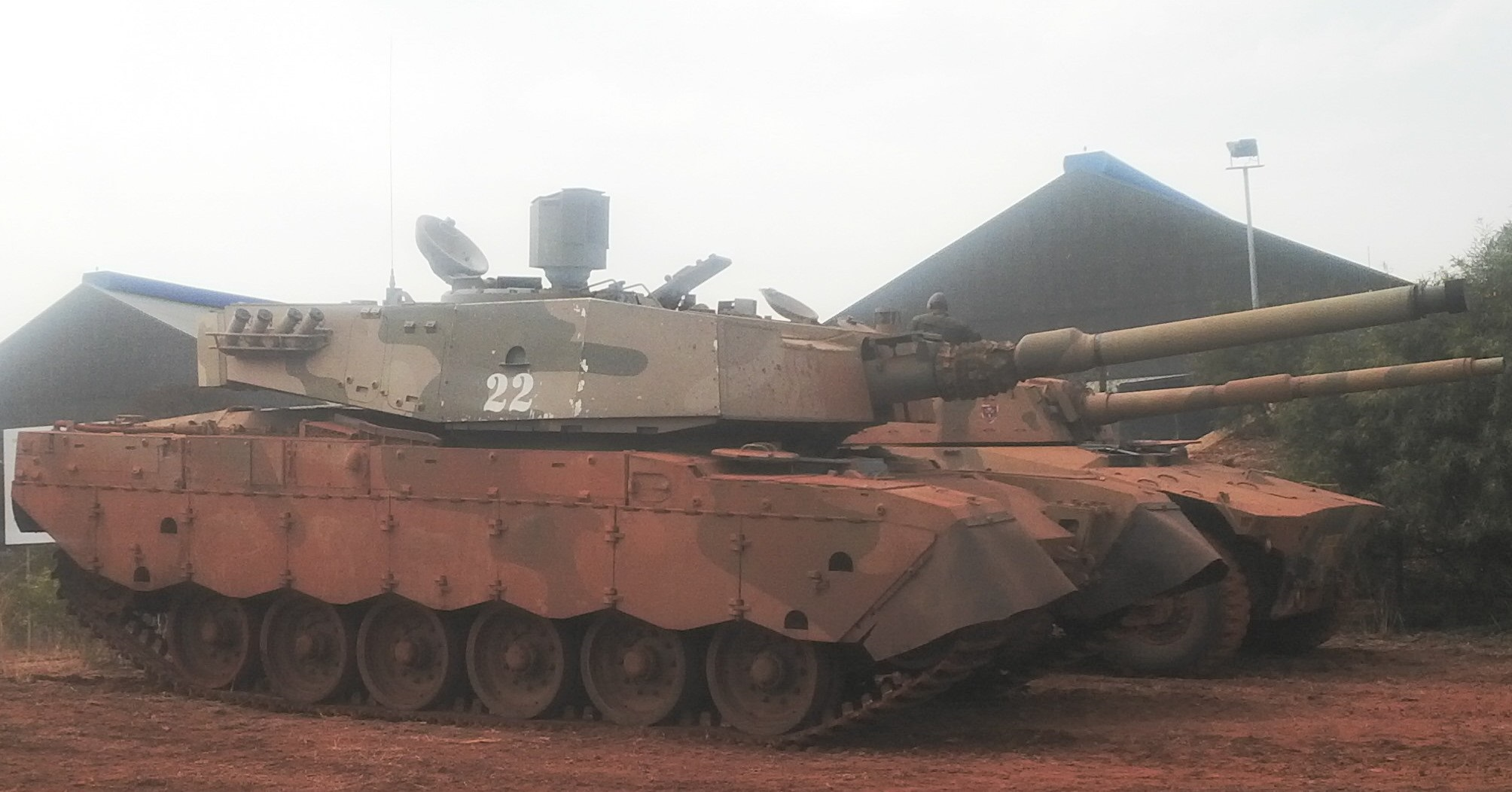
SANDF Oliphant mark 2 main battle tank at African Aerospace and Defence 2016

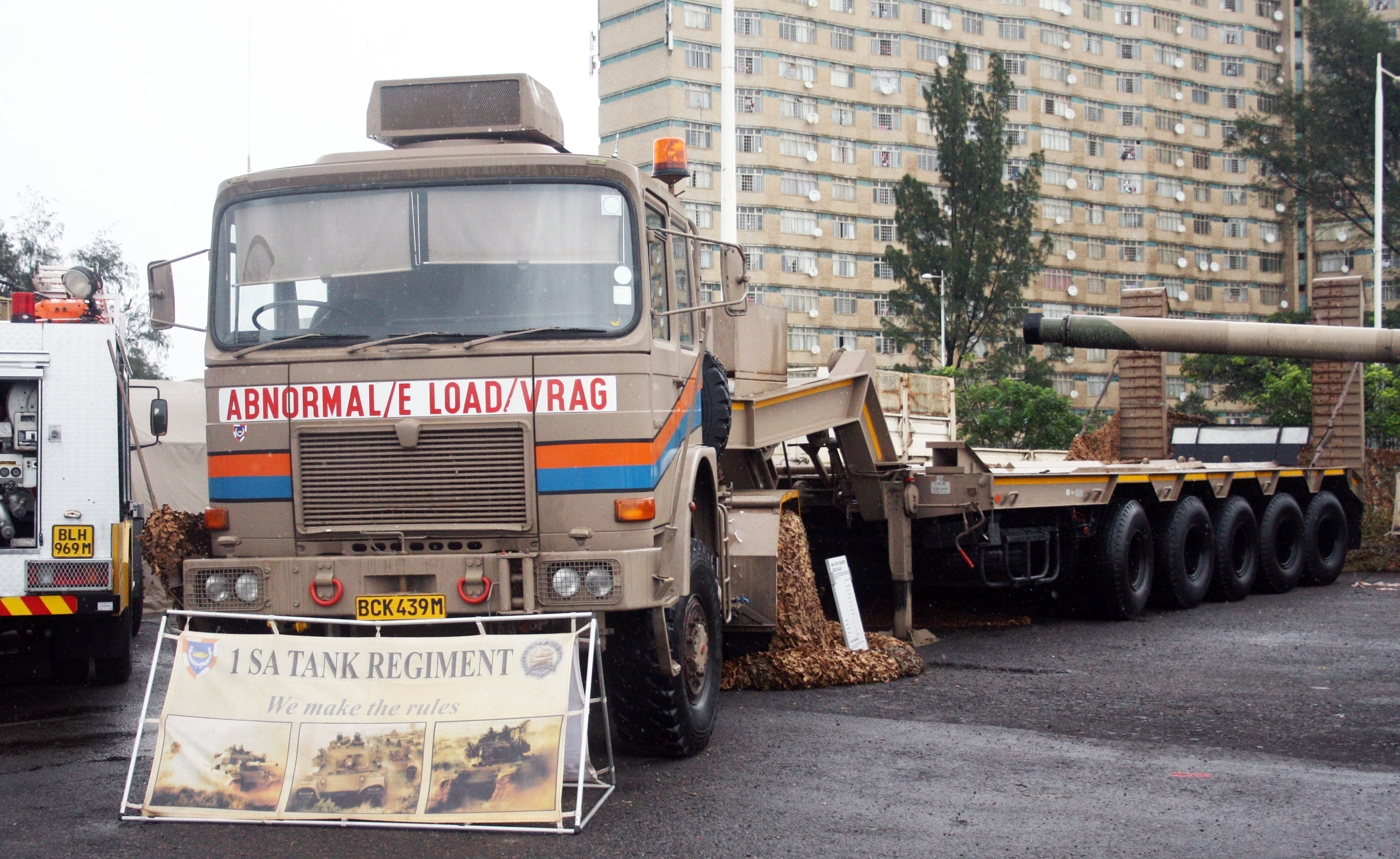
Tank transporter at SANDF Armed Forces Day 2017 in Durban

Due to a lack of funds for their primary armoured role and a shortage of regular infantry, the unit has recently been deployed in their secondary line infantry role on border patrol and external peacekeeping operations in central Africa. The C (or third) squadron was deployed from April to July 2004 along the Lesotho border and received praise from the Tactical headquarters, police and the farming community. Another squadron was deployed from December 2004 to March 2005. Several members of the unit have also been deployed to the Democratic Republic of Congo, DRC as part of the United Nations’ peacekeeping force MONUSCO and in Burundi as VIP protectors.

== Insignia ==
=== Previous Dress Insignia ===
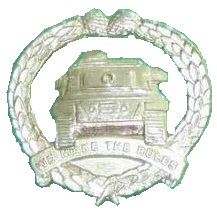
SANDF 1 South African Tank Regiment beret badge

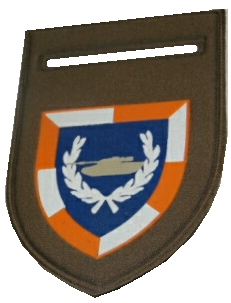
SANDF 1 South African Tank Regiment Tupper Flash

=== Current Dress Insignia ===
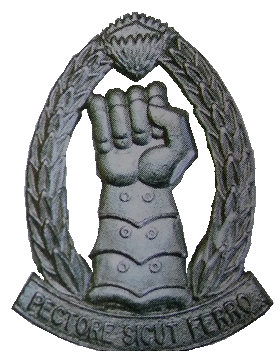
SANDF Armoured Formation beret badge circa 1996 forward
