= 2 Special Service Battalion =

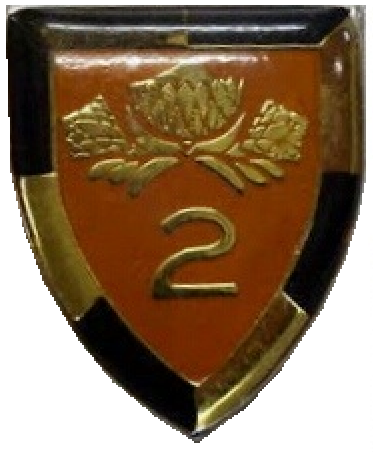
- 2 Special Service Battalion emblem
- Active: May 1946-1997
- Country: South Africa
- Branch: South African Army
- Type: Armoured
- Part of: South African Armoured Corps
- Garrison/HQ: Zeerust
- Nicknames: 2SSB (English); 2SDB (Afrikaans)
- Motto: Agere Victoriam” (Strive for Victory)
- Colors: Orange over blue which must be divided by silver. When it is not possible to use silver, white will be used in its place.
- Equipment: Ratel IFV; Rooikat
- Engagements: South African Border War; Operation Adding; Operation Baccarat
- Website: www.saarmour.co.za

Insignia
- Beret Colour: Black
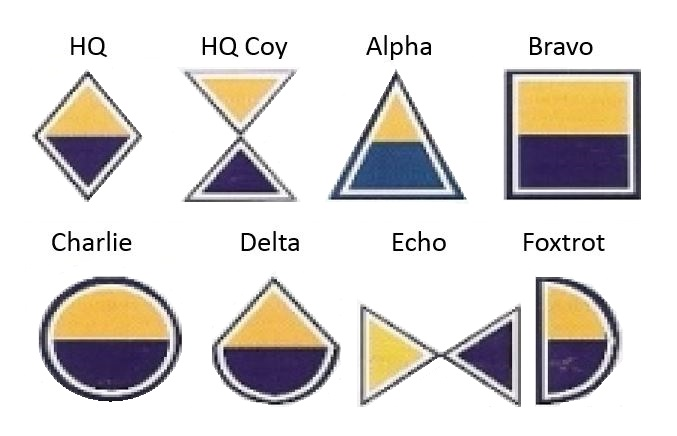
- Armour Squadron emblems

- Armour beret bar circa 1992

2 Special Service Battalion (usually abbreviated to 2SSB) was an armoured regiment of the South African Army and only one of two such in its regular force. The Regiment was based at Zeerust. It was known in English as, 2 Special Service Battalion, and in the Afrikaans language as, 2 Spesiale Diens Bataljon (2 SSB and 2 SDB).

== History ==
2 Special Service Battalion was founded on 1 May 1946 at Potchefstroom. The S.S.B. was a military unit formed to take in young men who were unable to find employment. Before World War II, the Special Service Battalion was reorganized into two battalions – 1st and 2nd Special Service Battalions. In 1946, the South African Armoured Corps was officially proclaimed and the Special Service Battalion was included in the corps as the only full-time unit and its symbols and colours were incorporated.

=== Infantry ===
Initially, the sole purpose of 2 SSB was to train members of the Permanent Force as infantrymen. 2 SSB was put into service officially on 21 February 1947 and on 26 January 1951, the name changed from 2 SSB to 1 South African Infantry Battalion (1 SAI). 2 SSB can thus be seen as the founding unit of the South African Infantry Corps.

=== Armour changeover ===
C-Squadron of 2 Armoured Car Regiment was founded during February 1962 with its official base at Zeerust. On 22 December 1966 the name was adapted to C-Squadron 1 SSB.

On 1 October 1973, 2 SSB, born from C-Squadron 1 SSB, was resettled. The headquarters of the regiment, as well as C-Squadron 1 SSB, was stationed at Zeerust, while D-Squadron 1 SSB was detached to 2 South African Infantry Battalion at Walvis Bay.

=== Border War ===
Several squadrons have taken part in the war in Namibia and Angola since 1974. From 8 October 1975 to 31 January 1976, B-, C- and D-Squadron took part in Operation Savannah. This border duty was continued with significant participations in Operation Protea, Daisy, Hooper and Modular.

On 25 January 1988, 2 SSB became the first unit in South Africa to receive the Right Of Free Admission to a coloured community, namely Henryville.

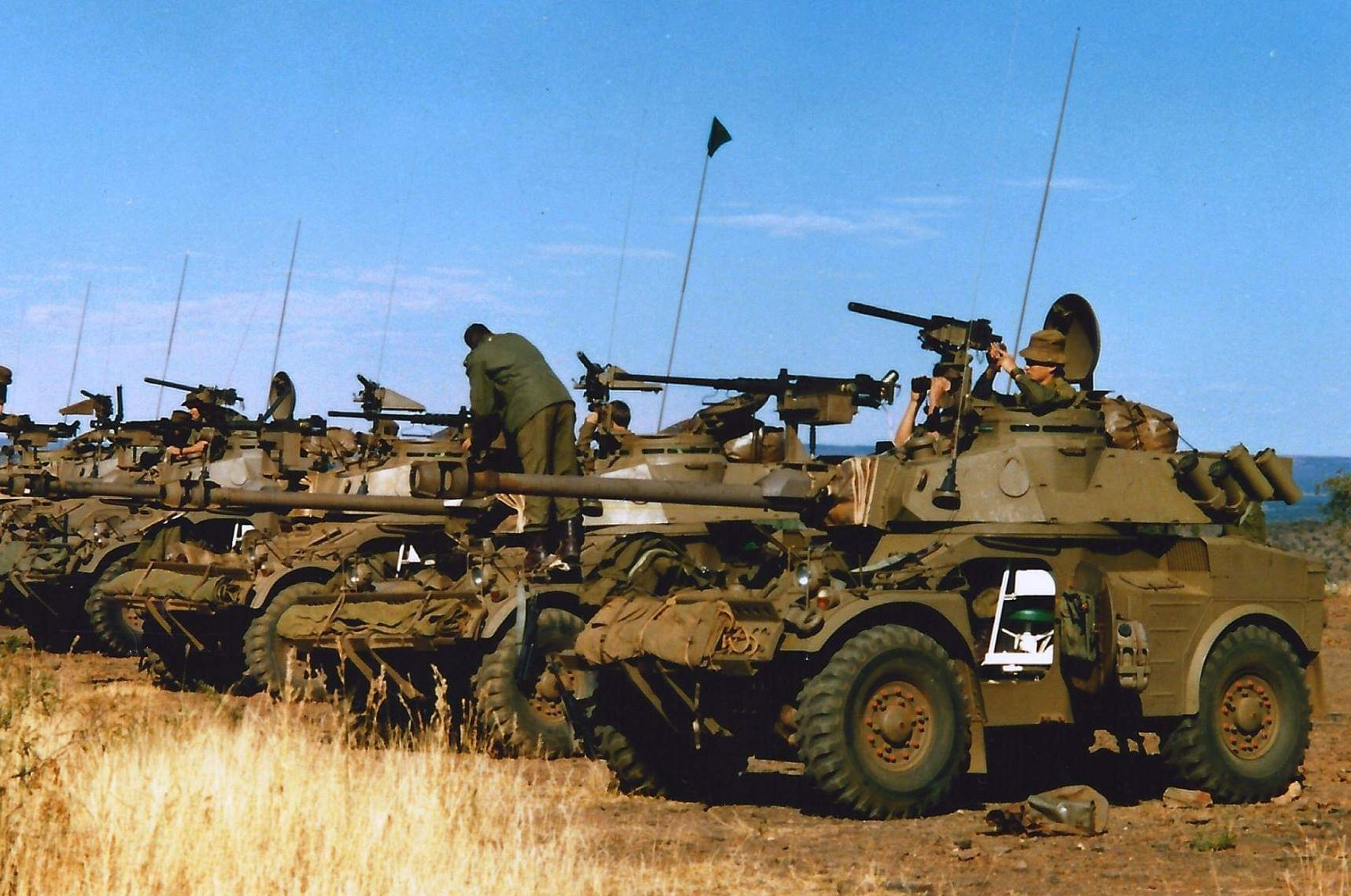
2 SSB squadron training exercise

=== Bophuthatswana coup d'état ===
On 10 February 1988, 2 SSB took part in Operation Adding during which President Lucas Mangope and his government was returned to power, after a failed coup d’état.

=== Rooikat Conversion ===
In May 1990, 2 SSB received the first Rooikat armoured cars and on 30 June its national colours.

=== Corps Change ARMOUR to INFANTRY ===
On 31 December 1992, as part of the reduction of the SA Army after withdrawal from SWA- Namibia (Resolution 435), 2 SSB underwent a change in role. The unit was transformed from an armoured car regiment to a motorised infantry battalion and provided with an operational company (A-Company) which was transferred from Group 20.

During the 1994 South African general election, 2 SSB took part in Operation Baccarat, providing stability and border protection for Mmabatho and Passado as a peace force ensuring stability in the North West province.

On 19 December 1994, the Bophuthatswana Defence Force Parachute Battalion at Gopane was placed under operational command of 2 SSB, as part of the founding of the SANDF. 2 SSB withdrew simultaneously from Nietverdiend and Nooitgedacht. From August 1994 to 15 June 1995, successful bridging training was provided for 550 formerly non-statutory force members.

=== Disbandment ===
Early in 1997, the rationalisation of the South African National Defence Force was announced and 2 SSB was one of the battalions that was disbanded. 2 SSB amalgamated with 10 SAI on 1 April 1997 in Mafikeng. 2 SSB was demobilized on 30 August 1997 after the base was transferred to 2 SAI Battalion.

== Regimental symbols ==
- The cap badge is a spray of three protea flowers, bound by a ribbon bearing the initials and motto.
- Regimental honour roll : Soldiers who died during active combat duty and soldiers who died during training. See 2 SSB Roll of Honour

=== Dress Insignia ===
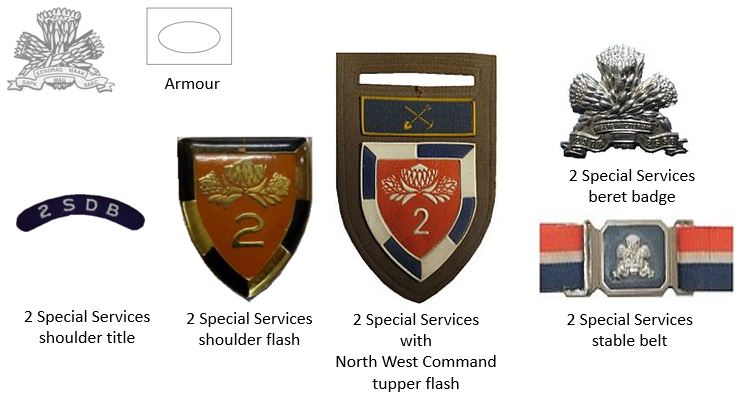
SADF era 2 Special Services Battalion insignia

== Honour Roll ==
- Baker, E. 1990
- Bridgeman, T.M. 1975
- Brink, C.M.1978
- Burger, W.J.1974
- Cronje, D.J. 1987
- De Lange, J.H. 1983
- De Lange, P.H. 1983
- Du Plessis, J.C. 1988
- Elsworthy, D.M. 1978
- Erasmus, E. 1988
- Eybers, P.G. 1975
- Hanekom, J.M. 1981
- Helm, H.C. 1985
- Jansen van Vuuren, F.H. 1984
- Lecuona, M.J. 1988
- Meerholz, J.R. 1980
- Muller, A. 1976
- Muller, D.M. 1979
- Muller, P.J. 1982
- Naude, D. 1983
- Obbes, G.M.F. 1975
- Oberholzer, W. 1981
- Randall, J.A.S.T. 1984
- Schoeman G.F. 1975
- Scott, G. 1988
- Stassen, P.I.M. 1983
- Steyn, D.A. 1981
- Taljaard, J.J. 1975
- Truebody, H.C. 1978
- van Rooyen, G. 1988
- van Wyk, W.A. 1988
- Viljoen, M. 1987
- Volgraff, G. 1975
- Ziemkendorf, H. 1987

== Leadership ==
Leadership
From	Honorary Colonel	To	Ribbon
	No known incumbents		
From	Officer Commanding	To	Ribbon
Oct 1973	Col G.D.M. Coetzee	Jan 1975	
Feb 1975	Col A.J. Snyman	Dec 1977	
Jan 1978	Cmdt J.W. Roos	Jun 1978	
Jun 1978	Cmdt A.C Slabbert	Dec 1981	
Dec 1981	Cmdt T.B. Beyleveldt	Dec 1984	
Dec 1984	Cmdt H.J. Kriek	Dec 1986	
Jan 1987	Cmdt C.J. du Ruan	Dec 1988	
Dec 1988	Cmdt J.C. Smith	Dec 1990	
Dec 1990	Cmdt A.J. van Jaarsveld	Dec 1992	
From	Regimental Sergeant Major	To	Ribbon
1969	WO1 M.A. Booyens PMM,MMM	Sep 1972	Pro Merito Medal PMM Military Merit Medal MMM
Oct 1973	WO1 L.J. Fourie	Dec 1977	
Jan 1978	WO1 R.D. Oosterlaak	Nov 1980	
Dec 1980	WO1 F. Kretsinger	Dec 1986	
Jan 1987	WO1 H.J. Venter	Jun 1992	
Jul 1992	WO1 D.J. Cloete	Dec 1992	

== See also ==
South African Armoured Corps
