= Willie Wolmarans =

South African General officer

Lieutenant General Willem J. Wolmarans SD SM MMM
- Born: 1 May 1937 (age 89)
- Military career
- Allegiance: South Africa
- Branch: South African Army
- Service years: -1993
- Rank: Lieutenant General
- Nickname: Willie
- Unit: School of Engineers
- Commands: Chief Instructor Staff Duties Army College; Commandant of the Defence College; Chief Director Manpower Provisioning; Chief of Staff Personnel
- Awards: Southern Cross Decoration SD Southern Cross Medal SM Military Merit Medal MMM Good Service Medal

Lieutenant General Willie Wolmarans SD SM MMM is a retired South African Army officer from the engineers.

He graduated from Stellenbosch University's Faculty of Military Science with a Bachelor's degree cum laude. He served at the School of Artillery & Armour and later at the School of Engineers. He completed the French Senior Staff course at École de Guerre. Chief Instructor Staff Duties at the South African Army College. Member of the committee to establish a "Joint Institution to train senior military and selected civil servants on strategic and national security issues" which resulted in the Defence College presenting the first Joint Staff Course in 1973. Member of the Directing Staff at the Defence College. He was appointed as the Commandant of the Defence College. He served as Chief Director Manpower Provisioning.

He served as Chief of Staff Personnel from 1992 till his retirement in 1993.

== Awards and decorations ==
- Southern Cross Decoration (SD)
- Southern Cross Medal (1975) (SM)
- Military Merit Medal (MMM)
- Good Service Medal (Gold (30 Years))
- Good Service Medal (Silver (20 Years))
- Good Service Medal (Bronze (10 Years))

Military offices
Preceded by Pierre Steyn	Chief of Staff Personnel; 1992–1993	Succeeded by Piet Loedolff
Preceded by Phil Pretorius	Chief Director Manpower Provisioning; 1990–1992	Unknown
