= Piet Loedolff =

Pieter van Zyl Loedolff
- Military career
- Allegiance: South Africa
- Branch: South African Navy
- Service years: 1964 to 1999
- Rank: Vice Admiral
- Commands: Chief of Staff Personnel

Vice Admiral Piet Loedolff is a retired South African Navy officer and author.

He joined the Navy in 1964 and obtained a Bachelor in Military Science (B. Mil) degree at the South African Military Academy. He served as Chief of Staff Personnel from 1994 till his retirement in 1999.

In 1992 then Commodore Loedolff, serving as Director Service Systems at Personnel Division, was promoted to rear admiral and assigned as Chief Director Manpower Maintenance.

Military offices
Preceded by Willie Wolmarans	Chief of Staff Personnel; 1994 – 1999	Succeeded by Themba Matanzima
Preceded by Willie Wolmarans	Chief Director Manpower Maintenance; 1992 – 1993	Unknown
Unknown	Director Service Systems (CSP); 1991 – 1992	Succeeded by Steve van H. du Toit
