= South African Army Armour Formation =

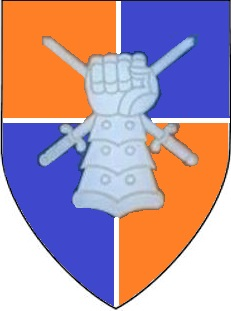
- SANDF Army Armour Formation emblem
- Active: 1946 - present (SAAC)
- Country: South Africa
- Branch: South African Army
- Type: Armour
- Role: Provides the Army with “battle winning shock action and firepower.” “To provide combat-ready armour forces to CSANDF.”
- Motto: Pectore Sicut Ferro (With a chest of steel)
- Colors: Orange, White and Blue
- Equipment: Olifant tank(current) Rooikat Armoured car (current); Ratel 90 (retired); Ratel ZT3 (current); Eland Mk7 Armoured car (retired); Centurion tank (retired); Stuart light tank (retired); Saracen Armoured car (retired); Sherman tank (retired); Marmon Herrington Armoured car (retired) Medium Mark A Whippet tank (retired)

Commanders
- General Officer Commanding: Brig. Gen. Christopher Pakade

Insignia
- Beret Colour: Black
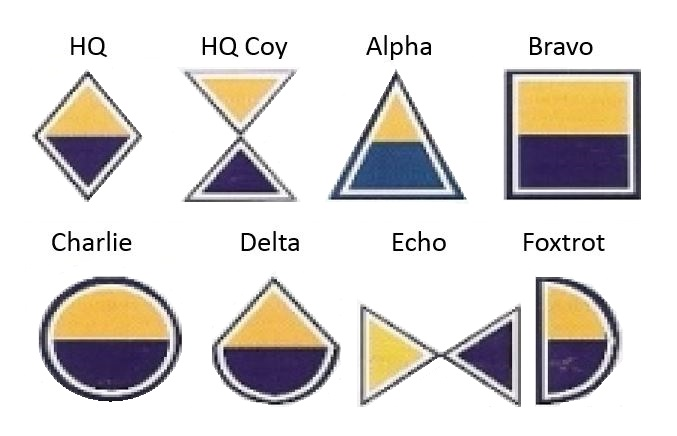
- Armour Squadron emblems

- Armour beret bar circa 1992

The South African Army Armour Formation provides an Armour capability to the South African Army. The Formation came into being as part of a restructure. South African Armour Corps units previously under the command of various different brigades and other formations were all grouped under one formation. All armour is assigned to the SA Army Armour Formation under the charge of a General Officer Commanding.

== History ==
=== Armoured Origins ===
South Africa employed armoured cars as early as 1915 during its invasion of the then-German South West Africa (now Namibia).

After the end of the First World War a single Medium Mark A Whippet light tank was purchased for the Union Defence Force and was operationally employed during the 1922 Rand revolt. The tank in question is now on display at the Army College at Thaba Tshwane.

The formation of an armoured corps was proposed in 1924. An armoured car section was formed the next year when two Vickers machine gun-armed Crossley armoured cars and two medium tanks were imported from Britain.

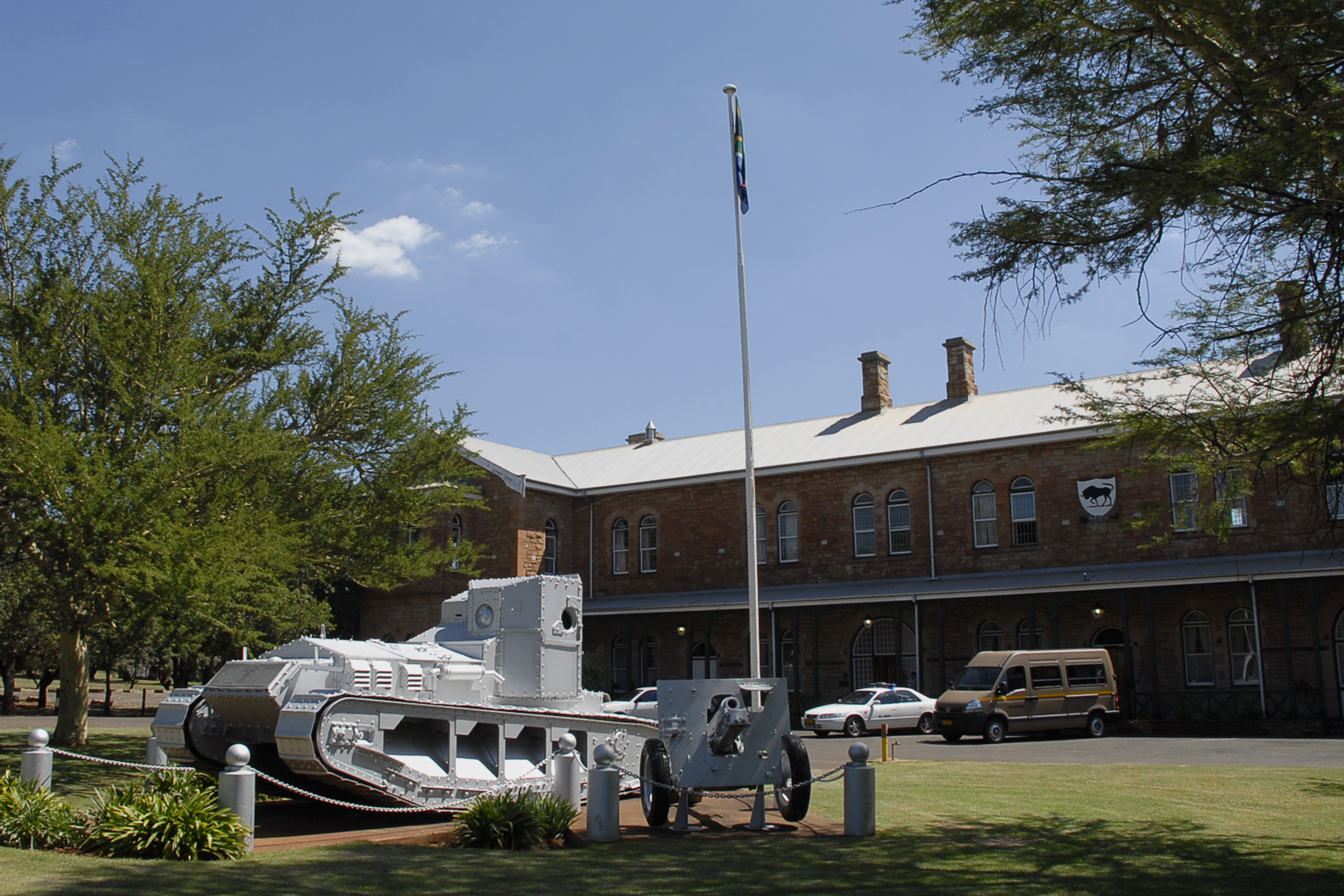
Whippet tank on display at Army College

During the severe economic depression of 1933, the government established the Special Service Battalion (SSB) on 1 May 1933 as a job opportunities and social upliftment project. The Springbok was first used as symbol for this unit until it was changed to the national flower - the Protea - in July 1934, which is still used today.

=== World War Two ===
The SSB was converted to an Armoured Car Regiment at the start of the Second World War, and later to a Tank Regiment. In April 1943 the SSB was deployed in North Africa and used a black beret sporting silver proteas as badge and a flash with orange, white and blue as its colours.

=== Armoured Corps ===
When the SA Armoured Corps was officially proclaimed in 1946 and the SSB included in the corps as the only full-time unit, its symbols and colours were incorporated

=== Armoured Formation ===
On 24 January 2014 the General Officer Commanding (GOC) SA Army Armour Formation, Brigadier General Chris Gildenhuys SM MMM handed over command to Brigadier General Andre Retief SM & Bar MMM at a parade at the Tempe Military Base in Bloemfontein.

The South African Army Armour Formation marked its 70th anniversary in October 2016 in Bloemfontein with the fourth Armour Symposium and a thanksgiving service.

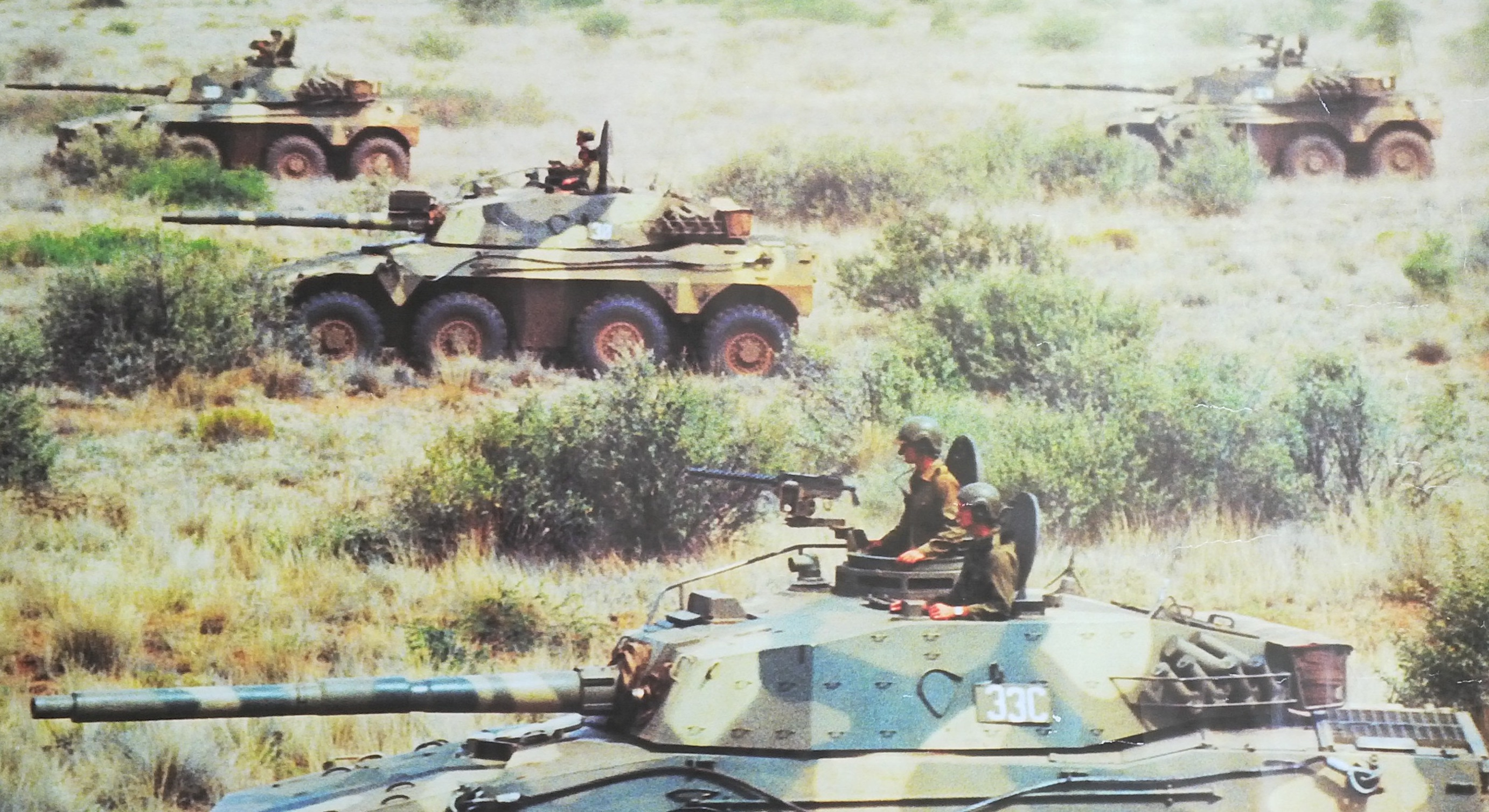
Rooikat Armour de Brug

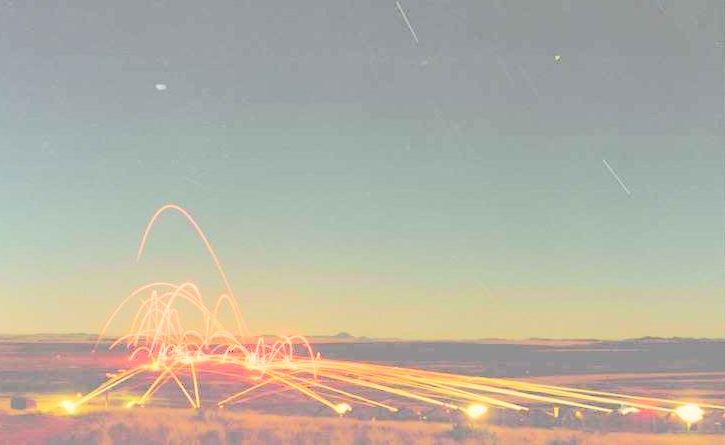
Olifant mk 2 concentrated fire night shoot de Brug Training Area

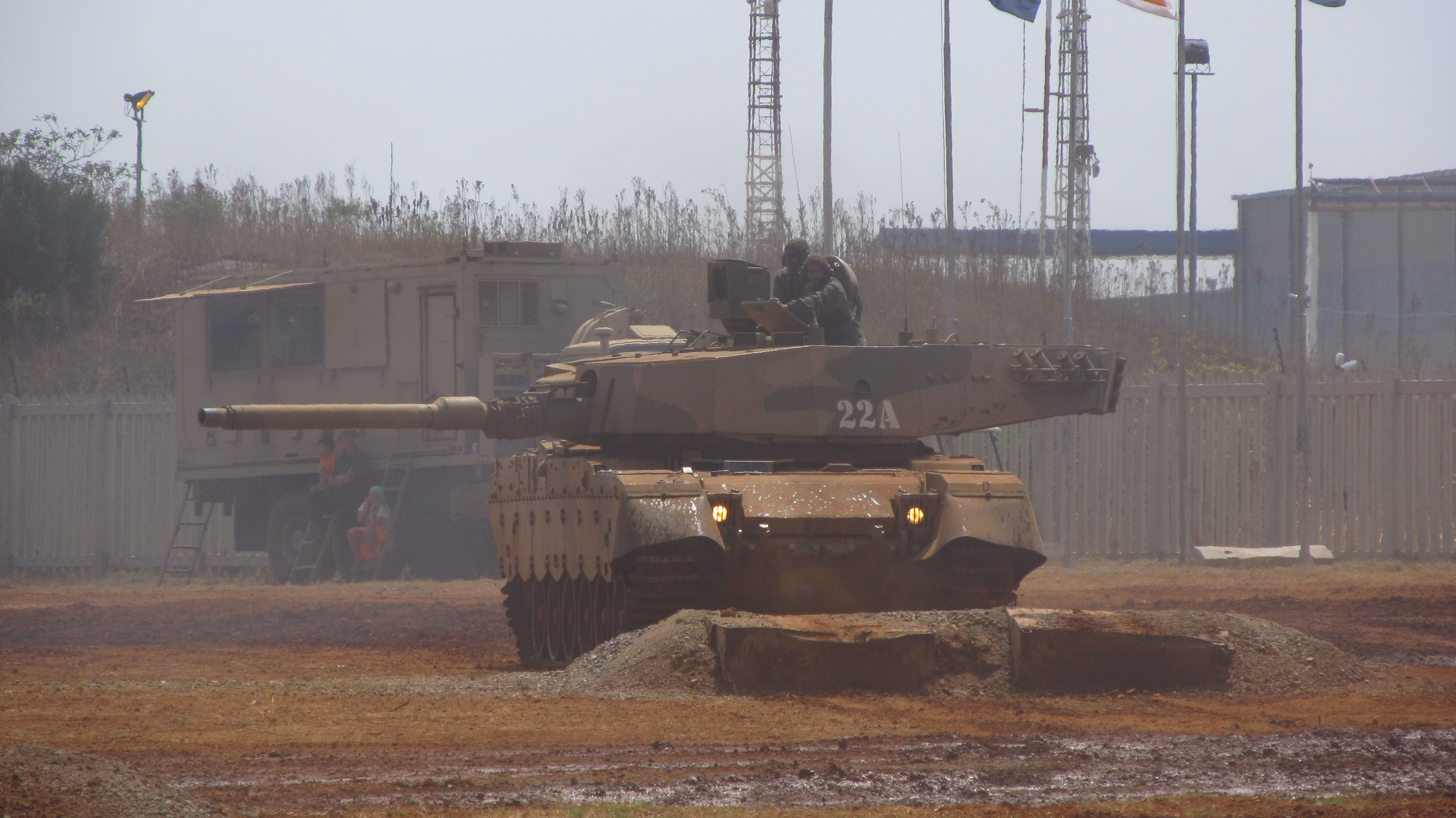
Olifant Mk2 AAD2014

=== Insignia ===
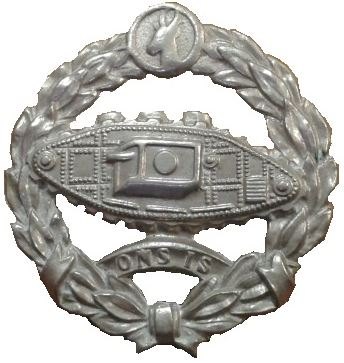
South African Army Armoured Corps Cap Badge circa World War 2

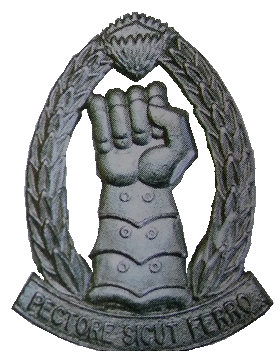
SANDF Armoured Formation beret badge circa 1996 forward

== Structure ==
The Formation is structured as follows:

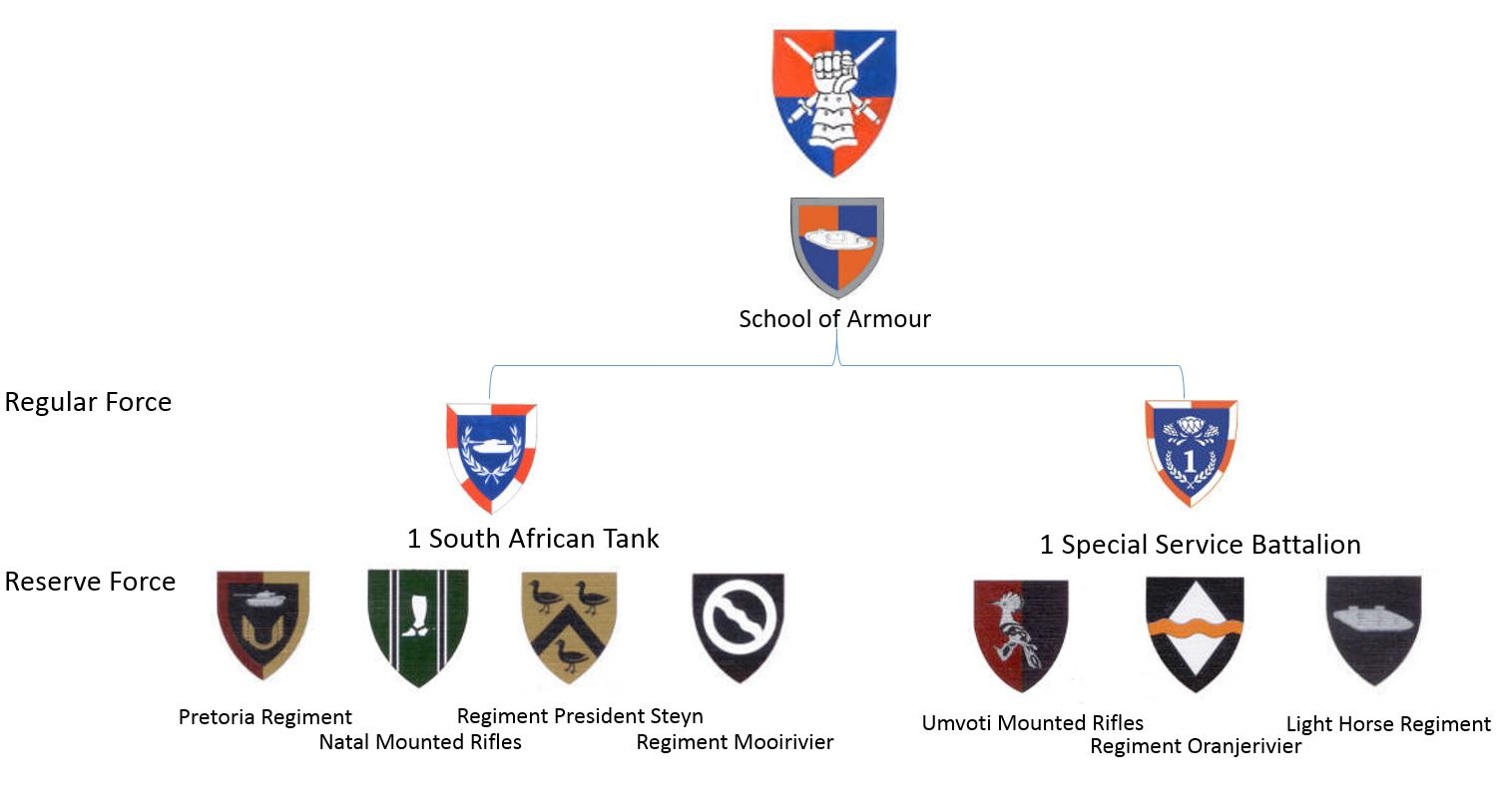

=== Training ===
- School of Armour, (Bloemfontein)

=== Tank units ===
These units are equipped with the Olifant Mk1B or Olifant Mk2 main battle tank.

==== Regular Force ====
- 1 South African Tank Regiment (Bloemfontein)

==== Reserve Force ====
- Pretoria Armoured Regiment (Pretoria)
- Queen Nandi Mounted Rifles (Durban)
- Thaba Bosiu Armoured Regiment (Bloemfontein)

=== Armoured Car Units ===
These units are equipped with the Rooikat and Ratel ZT-3 armoured fighting vehicles.

==== Regular Force ====
- 1 Special Service Battalion (Bloemfontein)

==== Reserve Force ====
- Umvoti Mounted Rifles (Pinetown)
- Blaauwberg Armoured Regiment (Cape Town)
- Johannesburg Light Horse Regiment (Sandton)
- Molapo Armoured Regiment (Potchefstroom)

=== Equipment ===
==== Tank Variants ====
Variant	Origin/Design	Comment	Image
Olifant Mark One A	South Africa	Main Battle Tank, Service: 1985, Engine: new 750 hp diesel V12 power pack, transmission and automatic gearbox, new coolant system, Weaponry: improved fire control and storage layout for ammunition, Survivalbility: fire extinguishers, Mobility: new track wheels Mineclearing: Both Olifant Mk.1A and B can be fitted with plough-type, electrohydraulic dozer blade or a roller-type mechanical mineclearing set. The 3.5 m wide dozer blade weighs 1500 kg	SANDF Olifant Mark one
Olifant Mark One B	South Africa	Main Battle Tank, Service: 1991, Engine: uprated 950 hp V-12 air-cooled turbo diesel engine provides increased range, Weaponry: more powerful 105mm L7 cannon with thermal sleeve, laser rangefinder added, 7.62mm general purpose co-axial machine gun and a 7.62mm anti-aircraft machine gun fitted, first gen image intensifier, driver's station equipped with day/night sight, gunner's station fitted with day/night sights, Survivability: glacis plate and nose of the hull upgraded with passive armour, turret stand-off armour, double-armour floor, running gear protected against HEAT missiles by new sideskirts, fuel injection system smoke screen in engine's exhaust added, fire detection and suppression system improved, Mobility: torsion bar running gear, hydraulic dampers fitted to the first and last pair of wheels, maximum road speed of 58 km/h and maximum range on internal fuel of 350 km, can ford water to a depth of 1.5m, negotiate gradients and slopes of 60% and 30% and vertical obstacles up to 1m in height	SANDF Olifant Mark one b
Olifant Mark Two	South Africa	Main Battle Tank, Service: 2007, Engine: uprated 1 040 hp Continental diesel engine Weaponry: 105mm L7 cannon, periscopic stabilized day/ thermal gunner sight with laser rangefinder, upgraded ballistic computer added to the fire control system, panoramic commander sight, full solution fire control system, fire on the move and day and night time engagements, ready rounds located in carousel mounted turret basket, allowing fire rate of 10rpm Survivability: modular composite armour sloping on turret and hull front, in case of ammunition ignition, blow-off panels and armoured doors protect the crew	SANDF Olifant Mark Two
Olifant Armour Recovery	South Africa		SANDF Olifant Tank Recovery
Shongololo Transporter	South Africa	MAN trucks	SANDF Olifant Transporter

==== Armoured Car Variants ====
Variant	Origin/Design	Comment	Image
Rooikat Armoured Car	South Africa	Rooikat Mk 1 76 mm main gun thermal sleeve encase barrel, 2 7.62mm machine guns, 2 banks of 81 mm smoke grenade launchers, run-flat tyres, digital fire control with automatic datafor target range, speed, and direction, crosswind speed, weapon tilt. 1000 km range, suspension of internally driven trailing arms, coil springs and shock absorbers Rooikat Mk 2 105 mm main gun	Rooikat Armoured Car 105 mm

General Officers Commanding
From	SA Armour Corps	To	Ribbon
1946	Unknown	n.d.	
From	SA Armour Formation	To	Ribbon
1 January 2000	Brigadier General eral Chris Gildenhuys SM,MMM	24 January 2014	Southern Cross Medal SM Military Merit Medal MMM
24 January 2014	Brigadier General eral Andre Retief MMM	31 August 2018	Military Merit Medal MMM
1 September 2018	Brigadier General Fezile Mbotyi	31 July 2021	
1 August 2021	Brigadier General Peter Goliath Mangana	23 April 2023	
1 December 2023	Brigadier General Christopher Pakade	incumbent	
