= Republic of Korea Army Engineer School =

South Korean military school

Republic of Korea Army Engineer School is a Republic of Korea Army military engineering school located in Jangseong, South Korea.

== Activities ==
In 2021 a research laboratory was set up at the location for developing a demining solution utilizing Artificial Intelligence to enhance accuracy of the military's mine clearance operations.
