= South African Army Engineer School =

School of Engineers
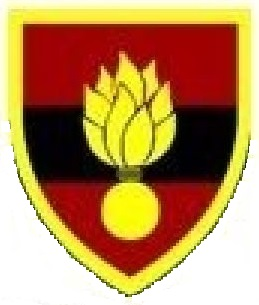
- South African Army Engineer School emblem
- Active: 1969–current
- Country: South Africa
- Branch: South African Army
- Role: Engineer training school
- Part of: South African Army Engineer Formation
- Garrison/HQ: Kroonstad, Free State

The School of Engineers is part of the South African Army Engineer Formation, which provides combat engineering corps training and teaching to military officers and personnel as well as other Military Schools (Centre's of Excellence) throughout the South African National Defence Force. They are currently the only Military School in Southern Africa to formally present IEDD (Improvised Explosive Device Demolition).

== History ==
=== Origin ===
In 1946, an Engineer Training Wing was established at what was then the Military College, now the SA Army College. In 1964, the post of GSO2 Engineers was filled full-time by a Regular Force Officer. In 1948, the Wing was moved to Potchefstroom, where it became the Engineer Wing of the SA Army Artillery and SA School of Armour. In 1968, it was transferred to Kroonstad as the Engineer Training Centre. In 1969, it became the School of Engineers.(subscription required)

=== Insignia ===
==== Previous insignia ====
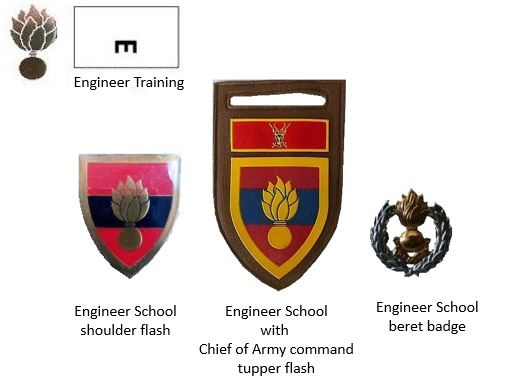
SADF era Engineer School insignia

== Curriculum ==
South African Engineer Corps Training

=== Training ===
Basic skills of military engineers are taught to all students, which is focused on combat:

- Mine warfare.
- Basic Field Engineering.
- Use of Power tools.
- Obstacles and Defense works.
- Water purification.
- Water provision.
- Watermanship.
- Bridge building.
- Demolitions.

These modules are spread over 16 weeks of intensive training. Recruits arrive in September from their Basic Military Training at Infantry School where they are qualified as Infanteers and graduate in December, inducted into the Sappers family.

=== 2nd phase Military Engineering Training (Specialization) ===
Recruits, who are now referred to as Sappers are then assigned to the following units for the various types of engineering disciplines:

- 2 Field Engineer Regiment: (based in Bethlehem), to become Combat Engineers, who will now specialise in-depth in all modules trained on during the 1st phase along with Engineer Paratrooper training as well as Battle handling amongst specialities.
- 1 Construction Regiment: (based in Nigel), to be further trained in the field of Civil Engineering, Artisans, Technicians, Construction Machine Operations as well as Operational Project Management.
- Engineer Terrain Intelligence Regiment: (based in Pretoria), they are trained and developed in various disciplines with regards to Geospatial Intelligence, Government Communications Information Systems (GCIS), Mapping and Survey, Environmental Analysis, Printing Services, Photography as well as other related functions.
- 35 Engineer Support Regiment: (based in Nigel), this unit is the support unit of the Engineer Corps as it manages all the equipment and inventory of the Corp. Recruits attached to this unit will be trained in the packaging, servicing, administration and utilization of all Engineer equipment. They are qualified as drivers of all everything that has wheels or is operable.
- 44 Parachute Engineer Regiment: (currently in Nigel), this regiment is currently under revitalization and is for recruits who have qualified and completed Parachute training at 44 Parachute Regiment. They are trained to infiltrate hostile operational areas by air to undertake rapid engineer tasks, serve as a reaction force to combat engineers and a force multiplier to the Infantry. The unit is currently a reserve unit.

=== Combat Engineering ===
South African Combat Engineering includes:

==== Constructing Infrastructure ====
The construction of roads, bridges, field defence and obstacles, water points, helipad construction, route reconnaissance, and erecting communication

==== Demolition of Infrastructure ====
Rigging, the use of explosives for the carrying out of demolitions, obstacle clearance and assault of fortifications.

==== Water Assault ====
Use of assault boats in obstacle crossings.

=== Operational Construction ===
Construction sappers are responsible for establishment of operational infrastructure for the South African Army, i.e. operational bases, roads and airfields. Functions include:

- Architectural
- Civil Engineering
- Electrical Services
- Builders
- Carpenters
- Electricians
- Plumbers

=== Other training ===
The School of Engineers runs about 100 training courses and many of the skills taught are directly relevant to the national economy.

- Bricklaying,
- Carpentry,
- Construction machine operation,
- Draughting,
- Electricians,
- Geographic information specialists,
- Surveying and
- Welding.

=== Specific courses ===
- Corps Training Course (701 ENGR 006): designed to equip a field sapper with the general military engineering skills and knowledge to obtain the main objective of engineering, namely survivability of own forces, general engineer tasks and denial of enemy mobility. This learning programme is presented to members with the rank of sapper and is the foundation course for all engineer officers.
- Troop Officers Course (701 ENGR 103): designed to train combat engineers who have been selected by the Engineer Formation Officers Selection Board for officer training at the SAEC. This training ensures that combat engineers could be utilised in posts as troop officers in the Field Engineer Regiment, and, during operational conditions, within the Field Squadron. On successful completion, the learner has to plan and execute field engineer tasks, such as terrain analysis, at sub-unit or squadron level. The learner has to function as a troop officer and to assist the troop commander of the SAEC at sub-sub-unit level.
- Troop Commanders Course (701 ENGR 16): designed as a part of the training programme for all SAEC officers with the rank of lieutenant in the disciplines required to act as troop commanders in the SAEC. These members are required to have completed the SAEC Troop Officers Course successfully in order to be accepted for this course. Upon successful completion of this learning programme, learners are able to plan and execute all combat engineer tasks and to gather information during reconnaissance as part of the responsibility of troop commander within the engineer squadron. The learner is equipped to act as an SO3 engineer and to function in a compartment of a formation.
- Squadron Commanders Course (701 ENGR 17): designed to train SAEC officers with the rank of captain. The aim of this programme is to ensure that SAEC captains can be utilised in posts as SAEC squadron commanders in the Field Engineer Regiment, and prepare them for the integrated Sub-Unit Commanders Course. The members are required to have completed the SAEC Troop Officers Course, the advanced bridge-building course and the equipment orientation course successfully in order to be accepted for this course. Upon successful completion of this, the learner would have been able to act as a Field Section Leader in the Field Engineer Regiment during operations.
