= School of Armour (South Africa) =

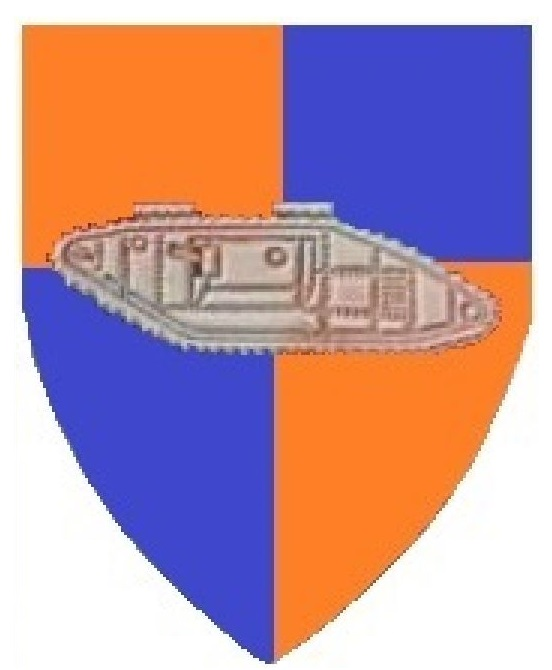
- SANDF School of Armour emblem
- Country: South Africa
- Branch: South African Army
- Type: Training Regiment
- Part of: South African Armoured Formation
- Garrison/HQ: Tempe, Bloemfontein
- Motto(s): Scientia vires est
- Colors: unit: blue and orange beret: black
- Mascot(s): mother tank of WW1 era
- Equipment: Olifant Mk.2 main battle tank
- Website: www.saarmour.co.za

Insignia
- Beret Colour: Black
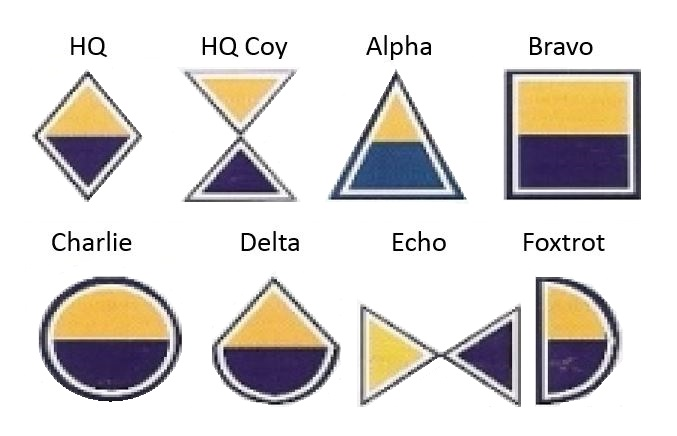
- Armour Squadron emblems

- Armour beret bar circa 1992

The South African School of Armour (Afrikaans: Pantserskool) is the training institute of the South African Armoured Corps located at Tempe, Bloemfontein.

== History ==
=== Origins ===
The Artillery and Armour School, at Potchefstroom was established on 1 February 1964, forming two separate schools on the same site.

=== Tempe, Bloemfontein ===
The School of Armour was then subsequently re-sited to Bloemfontein on 1 April 1966, co-locating with the then 2nd Armoured Car Regiment at Tempe.

=== Operational Wing ===
Whilst primarily a Training unit, varying in a number of squadrons and roles, the School of Armour also maintained an operational capability in the form of a Tank Wing.

=== Border War ===
From this Wing, the School deployed a tank Squadron to operations in Angola in late 1987.

The first operational use of Olifant tanks was carried out by the School in South-West Africa (Angola), acting as a defensive option against potential Cuban or Angolan incursions into that territory. The first actual engagement occurred during Operation Modular, with Echo Squadron. Fox Squadron later also became operational as well with Operation Hooper.

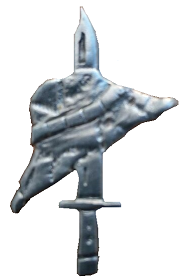
SADF Operation Hooper participation bar

== Function ==
The School of Armour trains regular and reserve tank crews, drivers and maintenance instructors for the SANDF, SAAC leader group and conducts research and development.

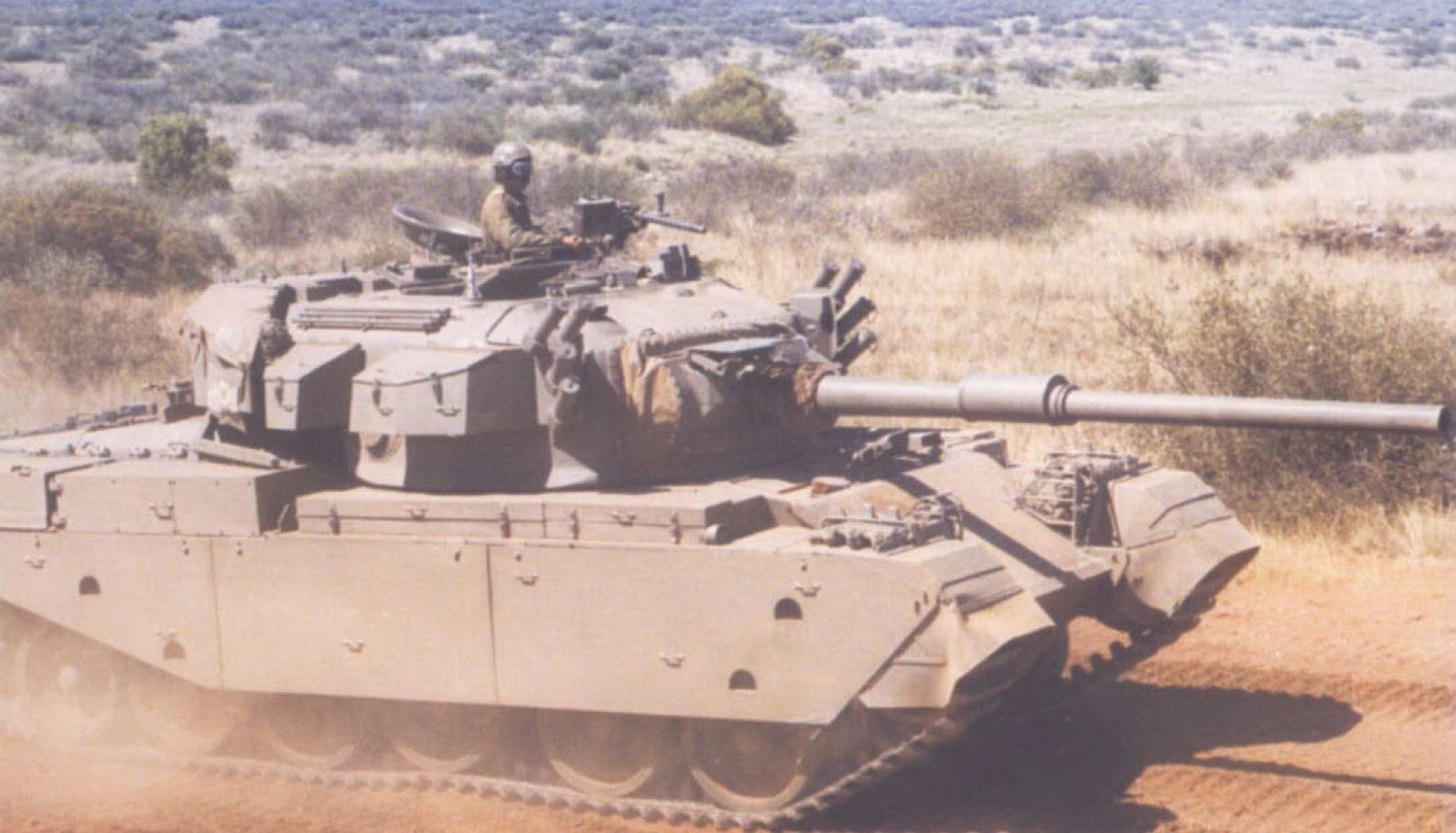
Olifant Mk 1 A de Brug Training Area 1993

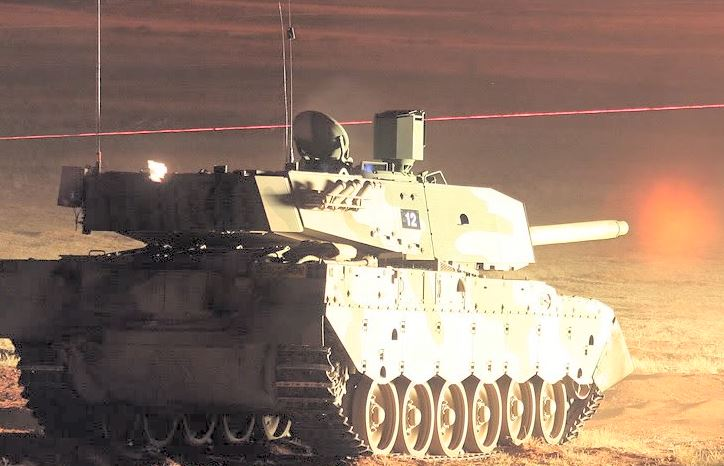
Olifant Mk 2 night shoot at de Brug Training Area

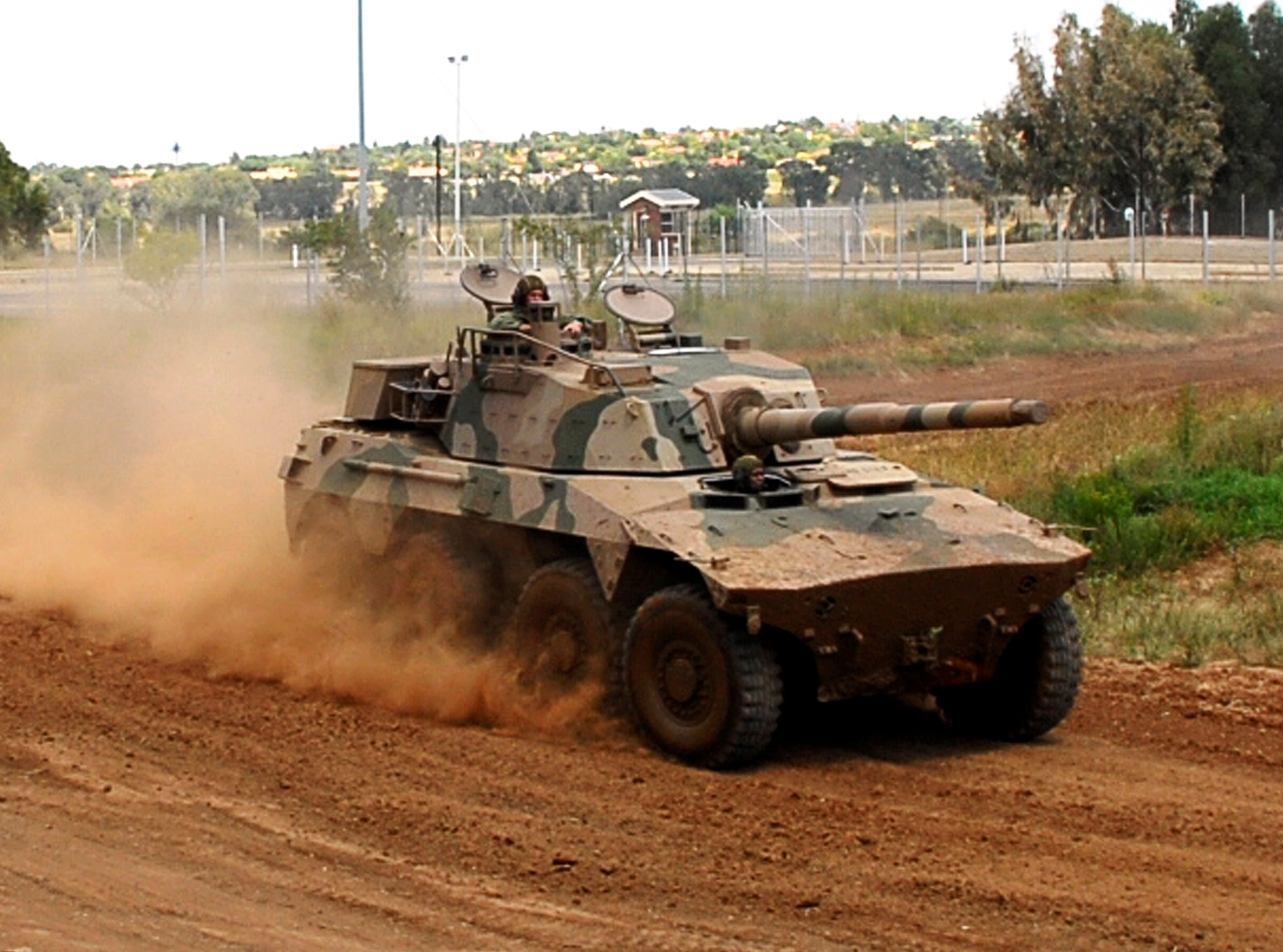
Rooikat armoured car (1990)

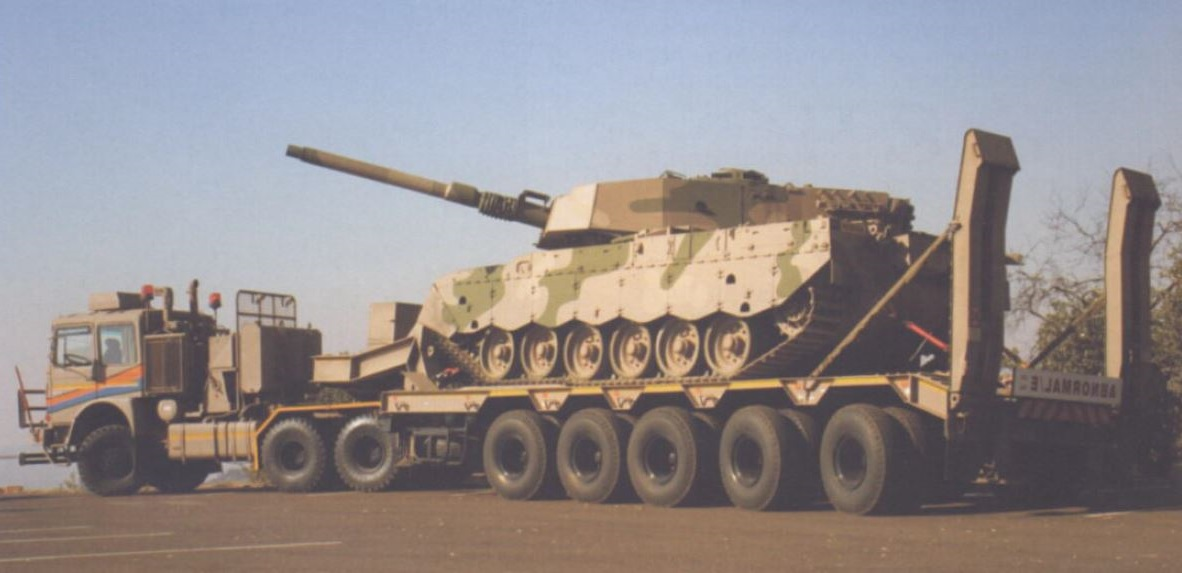
Olifant Mk 2 and Shongololo carrier

== Previous Dress Insignia ==
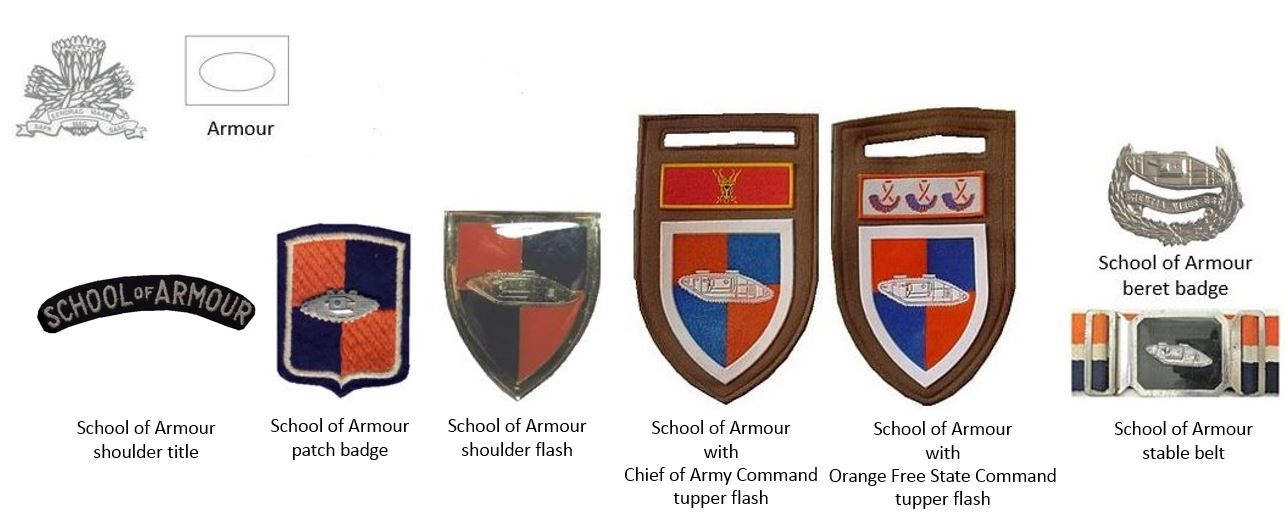
SADF era School of Armour insignia

=== Current Dress Insignia ===
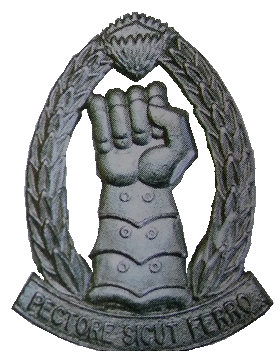
SANDF Armoured Formation beret badge circa 1996 forward

== Fleet ==
=== Tank Variants ===
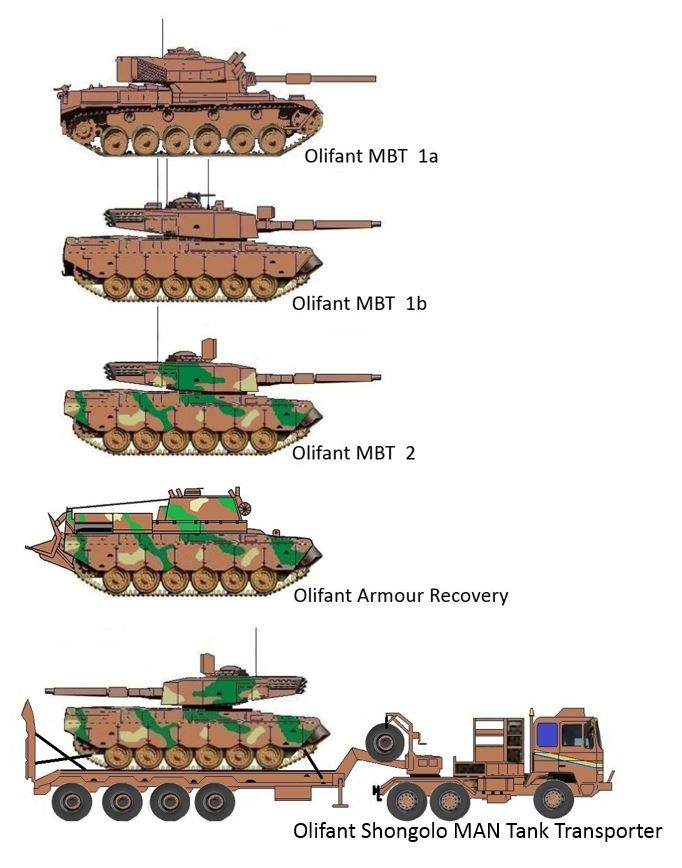

=== Armoured Car Variants ===
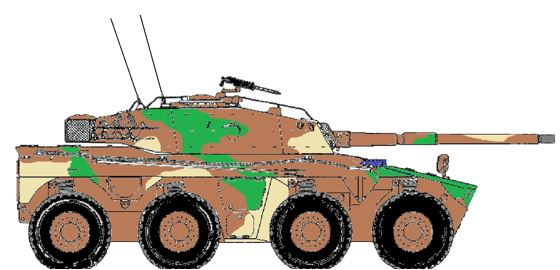

== Armour Museum ==
The idea of instituting a Museum and Research Library for the South African Armoured Corps started as early as 1994 and was officially approved by the Chief of the SA Army on 12 October 1995. Approval for the use of a historical building located in the lines of the School of Armour, Tempe was granted in April 1995. A number of fund raising projects was launched and donations was raised to manufacture a number of showcases and other items. An appeal to all members of the Armoured Corps and other interested persons resulted in a number of different items being donated to the museum. The museum was officially opened by the Chief of the Army on 13 September 1996 to coincide with the 50th anniversary celebrations of the South African Armoured Corps.

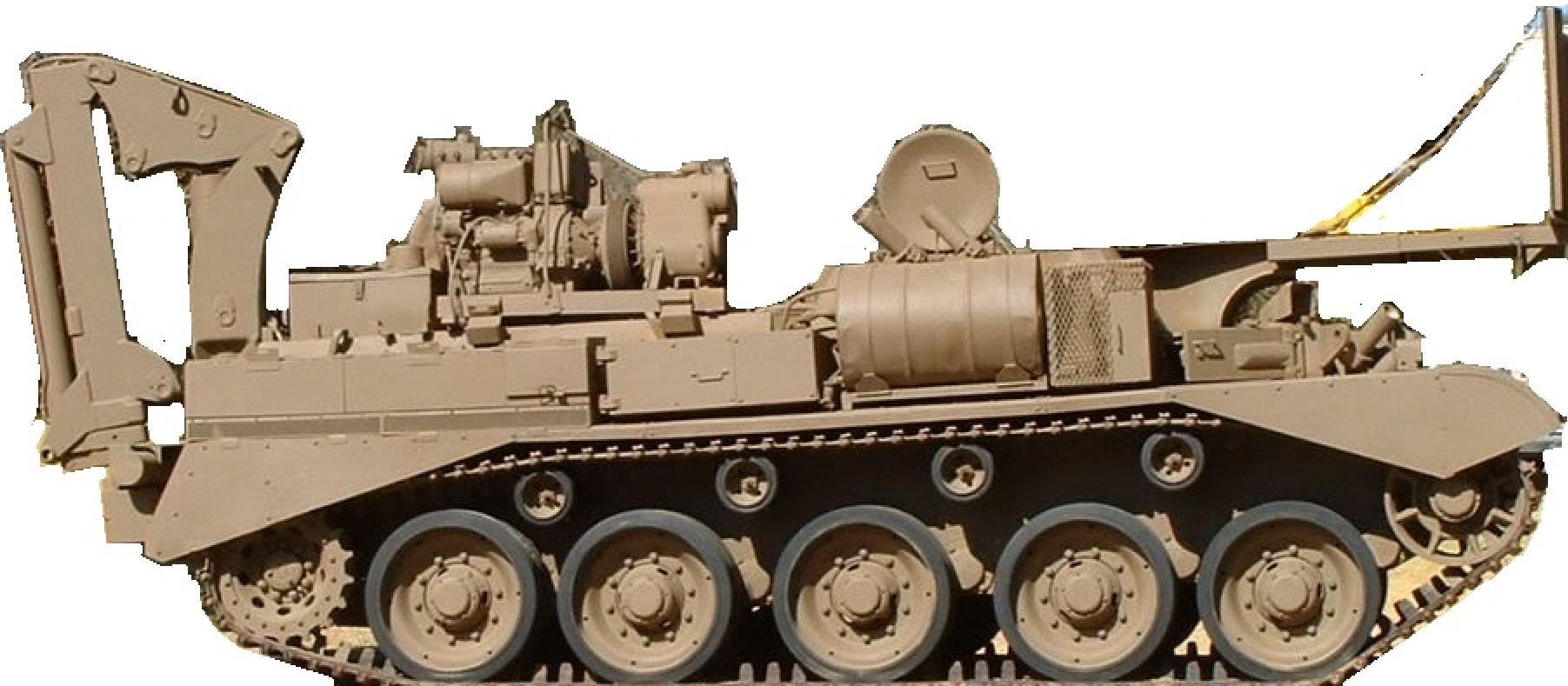
SADF Comet Armour Recovery Vehicle

Adjacent to and part of the museum is the research library, which specialises in the gathering of information, documents, periodicals, books, etc. with emphasis on armour warfare and equipment. The library also accumulates information on personnel, vehicles and archive books of the South African Armour Corps in particular. The library is in possession of a vast quantity of books, periodicals, documents, etc. for research purposes. This library also responds to requests from around the world concerning equipment and history of the South African Armour Corps.

"Hull-Down" was officially opened on 2 September 1999 by Brig Gen Fido Smit (Honorary Colonel 1 Special Service Battalion) and houses additional equipment and training aids that cannot be housed in the museum building due to limited space.

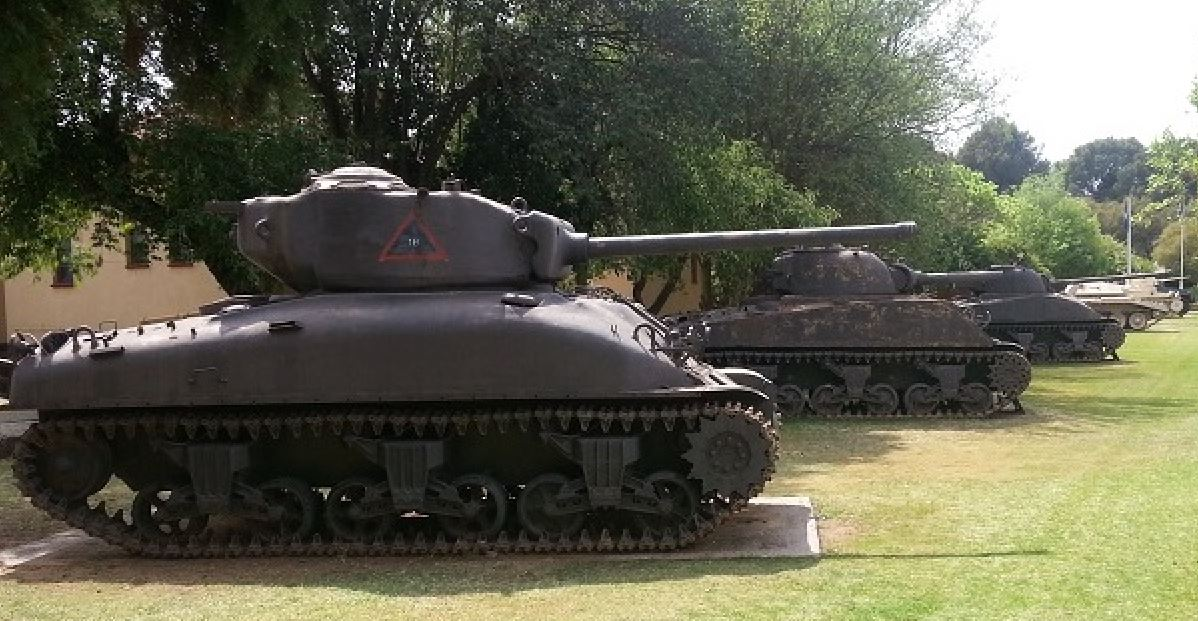
Armour Museum Lesakeng

Within the lines of the School of Armour and 1 South African Tank Regiment, some sixty plus armoured, tracked and wheeled vehicles are displayed. Other equipment such as guns, radar, mine rollers and ploughs are also displayed.

"Lesakeng" (the Corral for old Horses) houses numerous armoured, tracked and wheeled and other vehicles, mainly runners.
