= Star of South Africa =

Star of South Africa may refer to:

- Star of South Africa (diamond)
- Order of the Star of South Africa, a South African order
- Star of South Africa, Gold, a military decoration
- Star of South Africa, Grand Cross, a civil decoration
- Star of South Africa, Silver, a military decoration
- Star of South Africa (1952), a military decoration
