= Michal Muller =

South African military commander (born 1930)

Lieutenant General Antoine Michal Muller SSAS SD SM MMM
- Born: 28 July 1930 (age 96); Gauteng, South Africa
- Military career
- Allegiance: South Africa; South Africa
- Branch: South African Air Force
- Service years: 1948–1988
- Rank: Lieutenant General
- Nickname: Mike
- Unit: 2 Squadron SAAF
- Commands: 1 Squadron SAAF; 24 Squadron SAAF
- Wars: Korean War
- Awards: Star of South Africa SSAS Southern Cross Decoration SD Southern Cross Medal SM Military Merit Medal MMM Korea Medal (South Africa) Good Service Medal Union Medal United Nations Service Medal Korean War Service Medal Order of Military Merit (무공훈장)
- Other work: Diplomat

Lieutenant General Antoine Michal Muller SSAS SD SM MMM was a South African military commander who held the post of Chief of the South African Air Force

He attended Monument High School and matriculated from Central High School. He joined the Union Defence Force in 1948, training as a Pilot. He served with 2 Squadron SAAF in the Korean War, flying a P-51 Mustang. After his return to South Africa he served in various posts, including as Commanding Officer of 1 Squadron SAAF, 24 Squadron SAAF and Fighter Command.

He was appointed Chief of Air Staff Operations in July 1978 before becoming Chief of the Air Force in December 1979.

He served as Ambassador to Chile. He retired from the SADF in 1988.

In 2016, he was awarded the Taegeuk Cordon Order of the Military Merit Medal in a ceremony.

== Awards and decorations ==
- Star of South Africa (Silver) (SSAS)
- Southern Cross Decoration (SD)
- Southern Cross Medal (1975) (SM)
- Military Merit Medal (MMM)
- Korea Medal (South Africa)
- Good Service Medal (Gold (30 Years))
- Good Service Medal (Silver (20 Years))
- Union Medal
- United Nations Service Medal (Korea) (United Nations)
- Korean War Service Medal (ROK)
- Order of Military Merit (무공훈장) (1st Class - Taegeuk Cordon (태극)) (Note: Sometimes spelt Taeguk) (ROK)

== See also ==
- List of South African military chiefs
- South African Air Force

== Notes ==
Diplomatic posts
Preceded by Jack Dutton	Ambassador to Chile; 1985–1988	Succeeded by Pieter van der Westhuizen
Military offices
Preceded by Bob Rogers	Chief of the South African Air Force; 1979–1984	Succeeded by Denis Earp
Preceded by Edwin Archibald Pienaar	Chief of Air Staff Operations; 1978–1979	Succeeded by Jan v Loggerenberg
