= Ian Gleeson =

South African Army officer (1934–2021)

Ian Rimbault Gleeson SSA SD SM
- Born: 15 August 1934
- Died: 7 June 2021 (aged 86)
- Military career
- Allegiance: South Africa
- Branch: South African Army
- Service years: 1954–1990
- Rank: Lieutenant General
- Unit: 2 SA Infantry Battalion Group
- Commands: Chief of the Defence Force Staff; Chief of Staff Operations; Chief of Army Staff Operations; GOC 101 Task Force; 2 South African Infantry Battalion
- Conflicts: Battle of Cassinga
- Awards: Star of South Africa SSAG Southern Cross Decoration SD Southern Cross Medal SM Pro Patria Medal Good Service Medal Permanent Force Good Service Medal
- Other work: Author of the Unknown Force

Lieutenant General Ian Rimbault Gleeson SSA SD SM (15 August 1934 – 7 June 2021) was a South African Army officer who served as Chief of the Defence Staff.

He graduated from the Military Academy after attending Christian Brothers College in Pretoria and joined the Army in 1954. He became Officer Commanding 2 South African Infantry Battalion in 1971 and in 1972 OC Walvis Bay military base, and in July 1976 became GOC 101 Task Force. He then became Chief of Army Staff Operations on 15 January 1978 before taking on the recreated post of Chief of Defence Force Staff.

He retired in February 1990.

The post-Apartheid Truth and Reconciliation Commission found that when Generals Jannie Geldenhuys and Gleeson were informed that the SADF and Security Branch had assassinated Dr Fabian Ribeiro and his wife Florence on 1 December 1986 they failed to pass this information onto the Attorney-General or the police. The commission concluded that they both "acted in an obstructive way for which they are legally responsible".

== Awards and decorations ==
General Gleeson has been awarded the following:

- Star of South Africa (Gold) (SSAG)
- Southern Cross Decoration (SD)
- Southern Cross Medal (1952) (SM)
- Pro Patria Medal
- Good Service Medal (Gold (30 Years))
- Good Service Medal (Silver (20 Years))
- Permanent Force Good Service Medal

Military offices
Preceded by Post reestablished in 1986	Chief of Defence Force Staff; 1986–1990	Succeeded by Andreas Liebenberg
Preceded by Jack Dutton	Chief of Staff Operations; 1981–1985	Succeeded by Jan van Loggerenberg
Preceded by Cmdt Alex Potgieter	OC 2 SAI Bn Gp; 1971–1972	Succeeded by Cmdt "Boy" du Toit
