= Order of the Leopard =

Order of the Leopard may refer to:

- Order of the Leopard (Bophuthatswana)
- Order of the Leopard (Kazakhstan)

== See also ==
- National Order of the Leopard, Democratic Republic of the Congo
