= Star of Africa (disambiguation) =

Star of Africa or Cullinan Diamond is the largest gem-quality rough diamond ever found.

Star of Africa or African Star may also refer to:

- Africa Star, a military campaign medal for Commonwealth veterans of the Second World War campaign in North Africa
- African Stars F.C., a Namibian soccer club
- Black Star of Africa, symbol of Ghana or Africa
- Order of the Star of Africa, a Liberian honour
- Order of the African Star, a Congo Free State honour
- Afrikan tähti or Star of Africa, a board game
- Der Stern von Afrika or The Star of Africa, a 1957 film
- Hans-Joachim Marseille, a German fighter ace during World War II who was nicknamed the Star of Africa

== See also ==
- African sea star, a starfish
- African star grass
- African star flower
- Black Star of Africa symbol of Africa
- Star Africa Commodities & Minerals Limited, a Ghanaian company
- Star of North Africa, Algerian nationalist organization
- Star of South Africa (disambiguation)
