= Jan van Loggerenberg =

South African military commander (1935–2022)

Lieutenant General Jan Petrus Benjamin van Loggerenberg SSA SD SOE SM MMM ORB
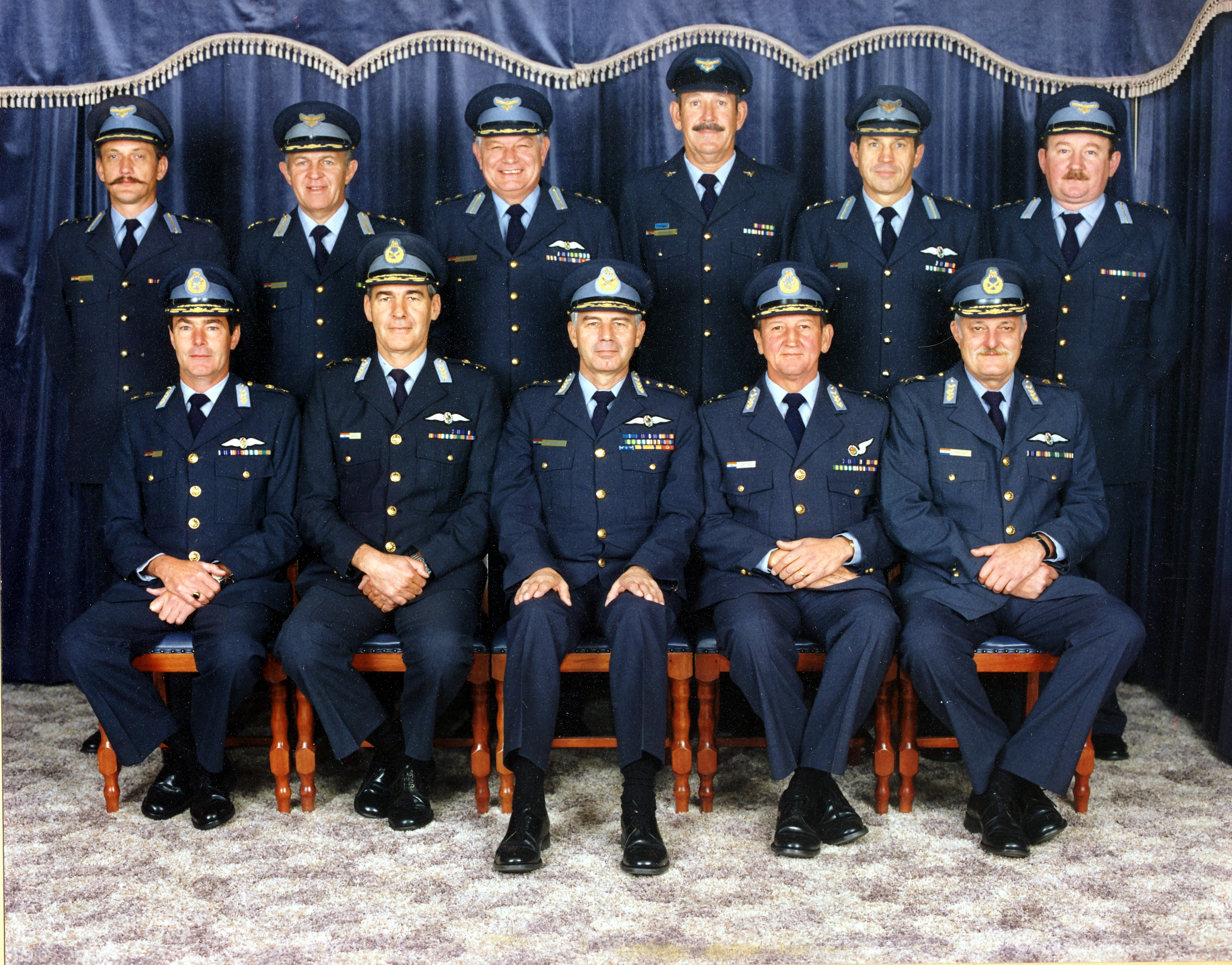
- South African Air Force Command Council, June 1990
- Born: 26 August 1935; Ermelo, South Africa
- Died: 9 March 2022 (aged 86); Pretoria, South Africa
- Relatives: Susanna Maria Christina Gillomee (Wife)
- Military career
- Allegiance: South Africa
- Branch: South African Air Force
- Service years: 1954–1991
- Rank: Lieutenant General
- Commands: Chief of the South African Air Force; South African Military Academy; 24 Squadron
- Awards

Lieutenant General Jan van Loggerenberg SSA SD SOE ORB (26 August 1935 – 9 March 2022) was a South African military commander, who held the post of Chief of the South African Air Force.

He joined the Air force in 1954 and obtained a BMil degree from the South African Military Academy, earning the Student of the Year award in 1957. In 1959, he was appointed a flying instructor at Central Flying school.

He joined 1 Squadron and 2 Squadron before moving to 24 Squadron flying Buccaneers. He also attended a Canberra conversion course in England. In 1971, he was appointed Air Force Attaché to Paris, France. On his return to South Africa, he was appointed the head of the South African Military Academy and thereafter Light Aircraft Command. He was appointed Chief of Staff operations in 1979.

In 1984, he was appointed Director: Operations of the SADF and in 1988 he was appointed Chief of the Air Force.

Van Loggerenberg died in Pretoria on 9 March 2022, at the age of 86.

== Awards and decorations ==
- Star of South Africa (1952) (SSA)
- Southern Cross Decoration (SD)
- South African Police Star for Outstanding Service (SOE)
- Southern Cross Medal (1975) (SM)
- Military Merit Medal (MMM)
- Pro Patria Medal
- Southern Africa Medal
- General Service Medal (South Africa)
- Good Service Medal (Gold (30 Years))
- Good Service Medal (Silver (20 Years))
- Permanent Force Good Service Medal
- Order of the Cloud and Banner (3^{rd} Grade - with Yellow Grand Cordon) (ORB) (Taiwan)
- Order of Aeronautical Merit (Grand Cross) (Chile)
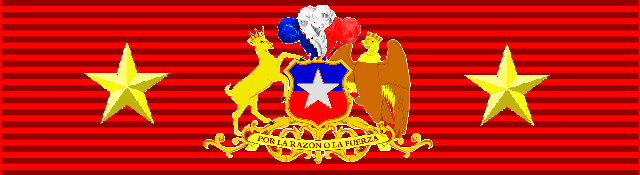
- Order of Military Merit (Grand Officer II) (Brazil)

== See also ==
- List of South African military chiefs
- South African Air Force
- Atlas Carver

Military offices
Preceded by Denis Earp	Chief of the South African Air Force; 1988 – 1991	Succeeded by James Kriel
Preceded by Ian Gleeson	Chief of Staff Operations; 1986 – 1988	Succeeded by Witkop Badenhorst
Preceded by Johan Potgieter	OC South African Military Academy; 1975 – 1977	Succeeded by Alex Potgieter
