= Raymond Armstrong =

Lieutenant General Raymond Fullerton Armstrong SSA SM
- Born: 14 December 1917; Manchester, England
- Died: 1990s
- Spouse: Dorothy Greenlees
- Relatives: Maj Gen Bertram Armstrong (father)
- Military career
- Allegiance: South Africa
- Branch: South African Air Force
- Service years: 1936–1976
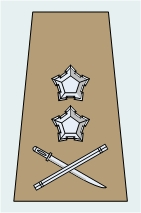
- Rank: Lieutenant General
- Service number: 01214089PE
- Unit: 2 Squadron SAAF
- Commands: Chief of Defence Staff; Chief of Air Staff; SA Air Force College; OC 2 Squadron SAAF
- Conflicts: World War II; Korean War
- Awards: Star of South Africa SSAG Southern Cross Medal SM Korea Medal (South Africa) Queen Elizabeth II Coronation Medal Union Medal 1939–45 Star Africa Star Defence Medal (United Kingdom) War Medal 1939–1945 Africa Service Medal (WWII) Distinguished Flying Cross DFC Air Medal United Nations Service Medal Korean War Service Medal Order of Military Merit (무공훈장)
- Other work: Director; Atlas Corporation

Lieutenant General Raymond Fullarton Armstrong SSA SM (14 December 1917 – early 1990s) was a South African Air Force officer, who served as Chief of Defence Staff.

== Biography ==
He was born in Manchester when his father was seeing in the British Army during the Great War. Armstrong attended Rondebosch Boy's High School before attending the South African Military College.

He joined the Special Service Battalion in 1936 and soon thereafter joined the Permanent Force. He was trained as a pilot, serving in World War II and later in the Korean War.

He was Armed Forces attache in Washington. He served as Chief of Logistics Services until 1968 and Chief of Air Staff before being appointed acting Chief of Defence Staff from 1 March 1974 to 30 April 1974. He was confirmed in this appointment on 1 May 1974. He retired on 31 May 1976.

After retirement he served as a director of Atlas Aircraft Corporation.

== Awards and decorations ==
He was awarded the following:

- Star of South Africa (Gold) (SSAG) (Note: Magnus Malan (SA Army), Raymond Armstrong awarded the SSA together in 1977 and all three received the new SSA that was introduced in that year, not the old 1952 version. Proof of this is the official photo of Magnus Malan, wearing the 1975 SSA around his neck and, since (as Minister of Defence) he introduced the bad habit of wearing night medals (miniatures) by day, also the miniature 1975 SSA on his chest.)
- Southern Cross Medal (1952) (SM)
- Korea Medal (South Africa)
- Queen Elizabeth II Coronation Medal
- Union Medal
- 1939–45 Star
- Africa Star
- Defence Medal (United Kingdom)
- War Medal 1939–1945
- Africa Service Medal (WWII)
- Distinguished Flying Cross (DFC)
- Air Medal (with Oak leaf cluster)
- United Nations Service Medal (Korea)
- Korean War Service Medal
- Order of Military Merit (무공훈장) (2nd Class - Eulji Cordon (을지)) (Note: Sometimes spelt Ulchi)

== Notes ==
Military offices
Preceded by Werndly Van der Riet	Chief of Defence Staff; 1974 – 1976	Vacant Title next held by Ian Gleeson in 1986
Preceded by Cbt Gen Danie du Toit	Chief of Air Staff; 1970 – 1974	Succeeded by Maj Gen JN Robbs
Preceded by Cmdt Danie du Toit	OC SAAF College; 1954 – 1960	Succeeded by Col Pierre Retief
