= General Armstrong (disambiguation) =

General Armstrong was an American brig built for privateering. General Armstrong may also refer to:

- Bertram Armstrong (1893–1972), South African Army major general
- Bigoe Armstrong (1717–1794), British Army general
- Clare Hibbs Armstrong (1894–1969), U.S. Army brigadier general
- Donald Armstrong (1889–1984), U.S. Army brigadier general
- Frank A. Armstrong (1902–1969), U.S. Air Force lieutenant general
- Frank Crawford Armstrong (1835–1909), Confederate States Army brigadier general
- Harry George Armstrong (1899–1983), U.S. Air Force major general
- John Armstrong (British Army officer) (1674–1742), British Army major general
- John Armstrong Jr. (1758–1843), U.S. Army brigadier general
- John Armstrong Sr. (1717–1795), Continental Army brigadier general and Pennsylvania Militia major general in the American Revolutionary War
- Raymond Armstrong (1917–1990s), South African Air Force lieutenant general
- Richard Armstrong (British Army officer) (c. 1782–1854), British Army lieutenant general
- Spence M. Armstrong (born 1934), U.S. Air Force lieutenant general

== See also ==
- Attorney General Armstrong (disambiguation)
