= General Dutton =

General Dutton may refer to:

- Arthur Henry Dutton (1838–1864), Union Army posthumously breveted brigadier general
- Bryan Dutton (born 1943), British Army major general
- Jack Dutton (1928–2011), South African Army lieutenant general
- James Dutton (Royal Marines officer) (born 1954), Royal Marines lieutenant general
