= Denis Earp =

South African Air Force officer (1930–2019)

Lieutenant General Denis John Earp SSA SD SM SOE
- Born: 7 June 1930; Bloemfontein, South Africa
- Died: 19 May 2019 (aged 88); Pretoria
- Military career
- Allegiance: South Africa
- Branch: South African Air Force
- Rank: Lieutenant General
- Commands: Chief of the Air Force
- Conflicts: Korean War
- Awards

Denis John Earp SSA SD SM SOE (7 June 1930- 19 May 2019) was a South African military commander, who held the post of Chief of the South African Air Force.

== Career ==
He attended Grey College, Bloemfontein, Military College in 1948 and joined the SAAF in 1950. After qualifying as a pilot he served in Korea with 2 Squadron SAAF. He was forced to bail out over enemy territory and was a prisoner of war for 23 months.

Released in September 1953, he was posted to 1 Squadron until January 1957. Then he spent two years as an instructor at Central Flying Service Dunnottar, before being appointed as a pilot attack instructor at the Air Operations School.

In 1964 he spent time in England converting to Canberra light bombers and on his return served as a pilot at 12 (Canberra) Squadron at Waterkloof Air Force Base. In December 1967 he returned to 2 Squadron as commanding officer. Eighteen months later he was appointed commandant flying at Air Force Base Pietersburg and after that senior staff officer (air) of the Joint Combat Forces.

His career took an unusual turn when he converted to helicopters and became officer commanding 17 Squadron at Air Force Base Waterkloof.

After that he became senior staff officer operations at SAAF Headquarters, then director operations from 1 June 1976, to 1978 and director general operations at Defence Headquarters in the rank of major general from 19 June 1978. He served as Chief of the Air Force from 1984 to 1988

His son, Lieutenant Michael Earp, was a helicopter pilot who was killed in the Border War on 5 January 1982.

== Aircraft flown ==
- North American P-51 Mustang
- SAF Dassault Mirage 2000

== Honours and awards ==
Gen Earp received the following Awards and Decorations:

- 1987 – Star of South Africa (Gold) (SSAG)
- 1986 – Star of South Africa (Silver) (SSAS)
- 1976 – Southern Cross Decoration (SD)
- 1973 – Southern Cross Medal (1952) (SM)
- n.d. – South African Police Star for Outstanding Service (SOE)
- 1953 – Korea Medal (South Africa)
- Pro Patria Medal
- Good Service Medal (Gold (30 Years))
- Good Service Medal (Silver (20 Years))
- Union Medal
- n.d. – United Nations Service Medal (Korea)
- n.d. – Korean War Service Medal
- 1952 – South Korea – South Korean Order of Military Merit (Chungmu Cordon) with Silver Star (Korea, 1952)
- 1952 – US – Air Medal (with Oak leaf cluster)
- 1987 – Order of the Cloud and Banner (2^{nd} Grade - with Grand Cordon) (ORB)
- n.d. – Chile – Gran Cruz Al Merito Aeronautico
- n.d. – Paraguay – Al Merito Miltar

== See also ==
- List of South African military chiefs
- South African Air Force

Military offices
Preceded by Michal Muller	Chief of the South African Air Force; 1984–1988	Succeeded by Jan van Loggerenberg
