= Star of South Africa, Commander =

- Type: Civil decoration for merit
- Awarded for: Exceptionally meritorious service which made a meaningful contribution
- Country: South Africa
- Presented by: the State President and, from 1994, the President
- Eligibility: Civilians in defence-related industries, general officers in the police, railways police, prisons service and intelligence service and foreign military attachés
- Post-nominals: CSSA
- Status: Discontinued in 2002
- Established: 1978
- Ribbon bar

Pre-1994 & post-2002 orders of wear
- Next (higher): Pre-1994 precedence: Order of Good Hope, Grand Officer, Silver; Post-2002 precedence: Order of the Companions of O.R. Tambo, Grand Companion
- Next (lower): Pre-1994 succession: Order of Good Hope, Commander; Post-2002 succession: Order of the Aloe

The Star of South Africa, Commander, post-nominal letters CSSA, is the third highest decoration of five non-military classes of the Order of the Star of South Africa, a South African military order that was instituted by the Republic of South Africa on 1 July 1975. The Order of the Star of South Africa was discontinued in 2002.

== Fount of Honour ==
Until 1958 the top three South African honours were reserved for conferment by the Queen while the rest were awarded by the governor-general, but in 1958 the governor-general was authorised to also award the top three. In 1961 the state president became the Fount of Honour, and in 1994 the president.

Civil honours were gradually introduced from May 1967. They were revised in the 1980s and in 1986 a Chancery of Orders was established in the Office of the State President, after 1994 the presidency, to administer most of them. Most of these honours remained in use after 1994, until an entirely new honours system was introduced in December 2002.

== Institution ==
The military Order of the Star of South Africa, established in 1975 and conferred on general and flag officers in two classes, was named after the first large diamond to be found in South Africa, the Star of South Africa that was found on the banks of the Orange River in 1869 and that sparked the New Rush, leading to the establishment of Kimberley. The order was expanded on 17 October 1978 with the institution of five non-military classes of the Order.

== Award criteria ==
The Star of South Africa, Commander, post-nominal letters CSSA, is the third highest decoration of these five civil honours. It was bestowed on civilians in defence-related industries and organisations and, from 1988, on general officers of the South African Police, South African Railways Police, South African Prisons Service and South African Intelligence Service for exceptionally meritorious service which made a meaningful contribution to the security and general national interest of South Africa. It was also bestowed on foreign military attachés for excellent meritorious service.

The five non-military classes of the Order of the Star of South Africa are:

- The Star of South Africa, Grand Cross, post-nominal letters SSA.
- The Star of South Africa, Grand Officer, post-nominal letters SSAS.
- The Star of South Africa, Commander, post-nominal letters CSSA.
- The Star of South Africa, Officer, post-nominal letters OSSA.
- The Star of South Africa, Member, post-nominal letters MSSA.

== Order of wear ==
The position of the Star of South Africa, Commander in the official order of precedence was revised twice after 1978 to accommodate the inclusion or institution of new decorations and medals, first with the integration process of 1994 and again with the institution of a new set of awards in 2002.

Official national order of precedence until 26 April 1994

- Preceded by the Order of Good Hope, Class II, Grand Officer.
- Succeeded by the Order of Good Hope, Class III, Commander.

Official national order of precedence from 27 April 1994

- Preceded by the Order of Good Hope, Class II, Grand Officer of the Republic of South Africa.
- Succeeded by the Order of the Aloe of the Republic of Transkei.

Official national order of precedence from 27 April 2003

- Preceded by the Order of the Companions of O.R. Tambo, Grand Companion (GCOT) of the Republic of South Africa.
- Succeeded by the Order of the Aloe of the Republic of Transkei.

== Description ==
Obverse

The Star of South Africa, Commander is a silver-gilt Maltese cross with the arms in dark blue enamel, with two four-pointed stars superimposed on one another and, together, on the cross.

Reverse

The reverse has the pre-1994 South African coat of arms, with the decoration number impressed on the upper arm of the cross and the hallmark below the coat of arms.

Ribbon

The decoration is worn around the neck on a dark blue ribbon, 35 millimetres wide, with white bands on the edges, each two millimetres wide, and a two millimetres wide orange band in the centre.

== Discontinuation ==
Conferment of the decoration was discontinued on 6 December 2002 when a new set of national orders was instituted.

== Notable recipients ==
- Roy Andersen, South African businessman and military officer.
