= Star of South Africa, Officer =

- Type: Civil decoration for merit
- Awarded for: Meritorious service which made a contribution to the security and general national interest of South Africa
- Country: South Africa
- Presented by: the State President and, from 1994, the President
- Eligibility: Civilians in defence-related industries, general officers in the police, railways police, prisons service and intelligence service and foreign military attachés
- Post-nominals: OSSA
- Status: Discontinued in 2002
- Established: 1978
- Ribbon bar

Pre-1994 & post-2002 orders of wear
- Next (higher): Pre-1994 precedence: National Intelligence Service Decoration, Gold; Post-2002 precedence: iPhrothiya yeGolide
- Next (lower): Pre-1994 succession: Order of Good Hope, Officer; Post-2002 succession: Order of the Leopard, Officer

The Star of South Africa, Officer (post-nominal letters OSSA) is the fourth-ranked decoration of five non-military classes of the Order of the Star of South Africa, a South African military order that was instituted by the Republic on 1 July 1975. The Order of the Star of South Africa was discontinued in 2002.

== Fount of Honour ==
Until 1958 the top three South African honours were reserved for conferment by the Queen while the rest were awarded by the Governor-General, but in 1958 the Governor-General was authorised to also award the top three. In 1961 the State President became the Fount of Honour, and in 1994 the President.

Civil honours were gradually introduced from May 1967. They were revised in the 1980s and in 1986 a Chancery of Orders was established in the Office of the State President, after 1994 the Presidency, to administer most of them. Most of these honours remained in use after 1994, until an entirely new honours system was introduced in December 2002.

== Institution ==
The military Order of the Star of South Africa, established in 1975 and conferred on general and flag officers in two classes, was named after the first large diamond to be found in South Africa, the Star of South Africa that was found on the banks of the Orange River in 1869 and that sparked the New Rush, leading to the establishment of Kimberley. The order was expanded on 17 October 1978 with the institution of five non-military classes of the Order.

== Award criteria ==
The Star of South Africa, Officer, post-nominal letters OSSA, is the fourth-ranked decoration of these five civil honours. It was bestowed on civilians in defence-related industries and organisations and, from 1988, on general officers of the South African Police, South African Railways Police, South African Prisons Service and South African Intelligence Service for exceptionally meritorious service which made a meaningful contribution to the security and general national interest of South Africa. It was also bestowed on foreign military attachés for excellent meritorious service.

The five non-military classes of the Order of the Star of South Africa are:

- The Star of South Africa, Grand Cross, post-nominal letters SSA.
- The Star of South Africa, Grand Officer, post-nominal letters SSAS.
- The Star of South Africa, Commander, post-nominal letters CSSA.
- The Star of South Africa, Officer, post-nominal letters OSSA.
- The Star of South Africa, Member, post-nominal letters MSSA.

== Order of wear ==
The position of the Star of South Africa, Officer in the official order of precedence was revised three times after 1978 to accommodate the inclusion or institution of new decorations and medals, first with the integration process of 1994, again when decorations and medals were belatedly instituted in April 1996 for the two former non-statutory forces, the Azanian People's Liberation Army and Umkhonto we Sizwe, and again with the institution of a new set of awards in 2002 and 2003.

Official national order of precedence until 26 April 1994

- Preceded by the National Intelligence Service Decoration, Gold.
- Succeeded by the Order of Good Hope, Class IV, Officer.

Official national order of precedence from 27 April 1994

- Preceded by the Lebowa Police Star for Distinguished Service of the Lebowa Homeland.
- Succeeded by the Order of the Leopard of the Republic of Bophuthatswana.

Official national order of precedence from April 1996

- Preceded by the Gold Decoration for Merit (GDM) of the Azanian People's Liberation Army.
- Succeeded by the Order of the Leopard of the Republic of Bophuthatswana.

Official national order of precedence from 27 April 2003

- Preceded by the iPhrothiya yeGolide (PG) of the Republic of South Africa.
- Succeeded by the Order of the Leopard of the Republic of Bophuthatswana.

== Description ==
Obverse

The Star of South Africa, Officer is a silver-gilt Maltese cross with the arms in dark blue enamel, with two four-pointed stars superimposed on one another and, together, on the cross.

Reverse

The reverse has the pre-1994 South African coat of arms, with the decoration number usually impressed on the upper arm of the cross and the silver hallmark below the coat of arms.

Ribbon

The decoration is worn on the chest on a blue ribbon, 35 millimetres wide, with a 2 millimetres wide white band, an 11½ millimetres wide blue band, a 1 millimetre wide white band and a 2 millimetres wide blue band, repeated in reverse order and separated by a 2 millimetres wide orange band in the centre.

== Discontinuation ==
Conferment of the decoration was discontinued on 6 December 2002, when a new set of national orders was instituted.
