= Jack Dutton =

Lieutenant General John Raymond Dutton SSAS SD SM MMM
- Born: 27 August 1928; Tulbagh, Cape Province, Union of South Africa
- Died: 29 November 2011 (aged 83)
- Military career
- Allegiance: South Africa South Africa
- Branch: South African Army
- Service years: 1947–1984
- Rank: Lieutenant General
- Nickname: Jack
- Unit: Special Service Battalion
- Commands: Chief of Staff Operations; Chief of Army Staff Operations; OC Eastern Province Command; OC 1 Special Service Battalion
- Conflicts: Korean War, Border War
- Awards: Star of South Africa SSAS Southern Cross Medal SM Military Merit Medal MMM Korea Medal (South Africa) Good Service Medal Union Medal United Nations Service Medal Korean War Service Medal
- Other work: National President of the SA Armour Association

Jack Dutton, SSAS SD SM MMM (27 August 1928 – 29 November 2011) was a South African Army officer who served in the Korean War.

== Early life ==
He was born in Tulbagh, Cape Province, and matriculated from Rondebosch Boys' High School in 1945.

In 1947, he joined the Union Defence Forces.

== Military career ==
In 1953, he was one of 12 officers sent to Korea where he was seconded to the Royal Tank Regiment. In 1964, he was appointed as Officer Commanding 1 Special Service Battalion. In 1968, he became Officer Commanding Eastern Province Command at the rank of Brigadier. He was then appointed Director of Armour. In 1973, he was promoted to major-general as Chief of Army Staff Operations from 1 July 1973. In 1976 he became Chief of Staff Operations with the rank of Lieutenant-general.

== Diplomatic service ==
While still in the Army he was appointed South African ambassador to Chile.

== Awards and decorations ==
- Star of South Africa (Silver) (SSAS)
- Southern Cross Medal (1952) (SM)
- Military Merit Medal (MMM)
- Korea Medal (South Africa)
- Good Service Medal (Gold (30 Years))
- Good Service Medal (Silver (20 Years))
- Union Medal
- United Nations Service Medal (Korea)
- Korean War Service Medal
- Order of Bernardo O'Higgins

Diplomatic posts
Preceded by Norman John Best	Ambassador to Chile; 1981–1984	Succeeded by Michal Muller
Military offices
Preceded by	Chief of Staff Operations; 1976–1981	Succeeded by Ian Gleeson
Preceded by JJ Wahl	OC 1 SSB; 1964–1967	Succeeded by WH 'Bill' Matthews
