= Kate Molale =

South African political activist (1928–1980)

Kate Molale in 1971.

Kate Molale OMSS (22 January 1928 – 9 May 1980) was a South African political activist, between 1970 and 1975 she represented the ANC Women's League/Women's Section in the Women's International Democratic Federation.

She joined the African National Congress Sophiatown branch in the early 1950s. In 1954 she was elected as secretary of the Sophiatown ANC branch. She was an activist in the popular resistance against the forced eviction of the Sophiatown residents. She mobilised people against the 1953 Bantu Education Act, organising pioneers (Masupatsela) to bolster the school boycotts in protest against the Bantu Education Act. Under her leadership many children were mobilised for school boycotts in Sophiatown, Orlando, Brakpan, Randfontein and Alexandra.

Molale became a member of the National Executive of the ANC Women's League. She was also the ANC Youth League Transvaal secretary.

Conducting surveys amongst the South African populace, Molale played a key role in the drafting process of the Freedom Charter.

In 1955 Molale was part of a delegation that went to the Native Commissioner in Johannesburg to deliver a protest against the extension of pass laws to include African women. As the delegation left the Native Commissioner's office, they were detained and charged. Molale was one of the key activists in mobilising women during 9 August 1956 anti-pass campaign, travelling to various corners of the country on agitation tours.

Molale was one of the ANC activists targeted at the time of the launching of 90 days' detention without trial. After being released from detention, she went underground and became a commander of Umkhonto we Sizwe.

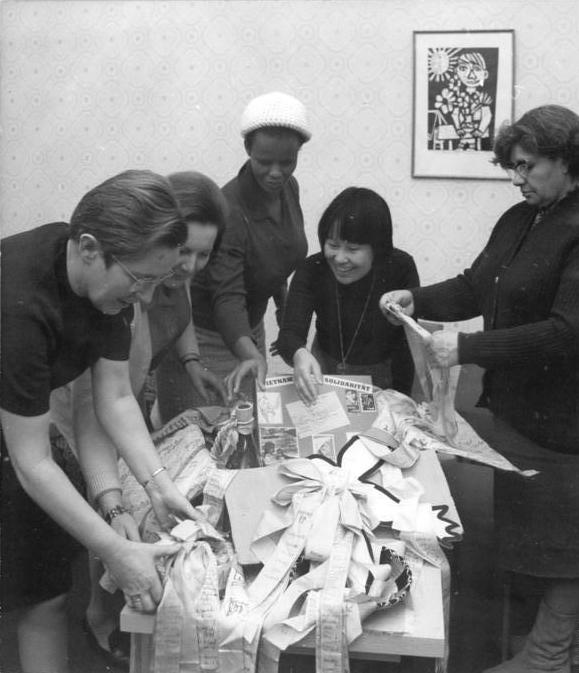
1971 solidarity action for Vietnam, organised by the Frankfurt/Oder branch of the Democratic Women's League of Germany (DFD). Kate Molale (3rd from left) and other officials at the WIDF headquarters in Berlin, going through petitions collected by the DFD in Frankfurt/Oder.

Between 1970 and 1975 Molale represented the ANC Women's League/Women's Section in the Women's International Democratic Federation. After leaving the WIDF office, Molale based herself in Morogoro, Tanzania. In Tanzania she dedicated herself to the care of children of exiled South African activists. Molale suffered a traffic accident in Tanzania on 3 May 1980. Whilst co-traveller Peter Sithole died immediately, Molale passed into coma. She was pronounced dead on 9 May 1980.
