= Bambatha Rifles =

Bambatha Rifles Witwatersrand Rifles
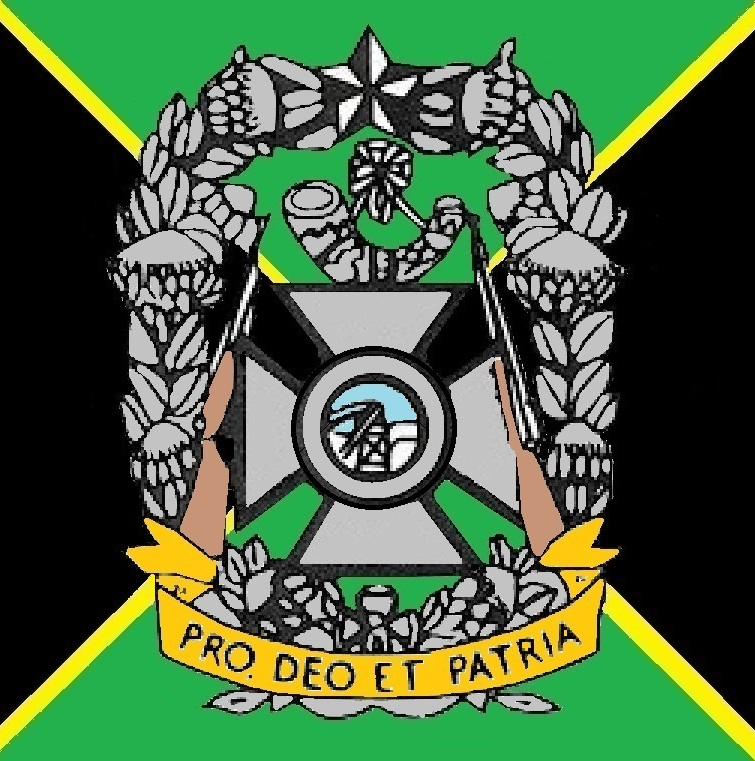
- SANDF Witwatersrand Rifles emblem
- Active: 1 May 1903–present
- Country: South Africa
- Allegiance: Union of South Africa; Republic of South Africa; Republic of South Africa
- Branch: South African Army; South African Army; South African Army
- Type: Infantry
- Role: Mechanised infantry
- Size: One battalion
- Part of: South African Infantry Formation; Army Reserve
- Garrison/HQ: Germiston
- Mottos: Pro Deo et Patria (Latin) (For God and Country)
- March: Within a mile O' Edinburgh town
- Anniversaries: 1 May 1903 (Regimental Day)

Commanders
- Colonel of the Regiment: Col. (Hon) J.L. Job, SM MMM JCD

Insignia
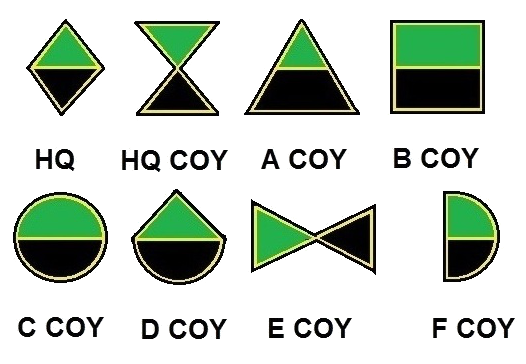
- Company level Insignia

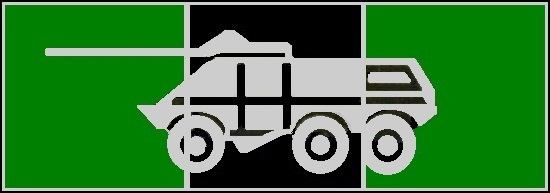
- SA Mechanised Infantry beret bar circa 1992: SA mechanised infantry beret bar circa 1992
- Abbreviation: BR

The Bambatha Rifles (formerly the Witwatersrand Rifles) is a reserve mechanised infantry regiment of the South African Army.

== History ==
=== Origin ===
The Witwatersrand Rifles (often familiarly known as the "Wits Rifles or the Wit Rifles") was formed by proclamation on 1 May 1903 and absorbed the members of the Railway Pioneer Regiment and the Rand Rifles, both of which had fought on the British side during the Second Anglo-Boer War of 1899 – 1902.

As befitted a regiment based from the gold-rich Witwatersrand region, it had a very close relationship with the mining establishment of the time; and its cap badge further emphasised this link.

=== Bambatha Rebellion ===
The regiment first saw action during the Bambata Rebellion of 1906, when it deployed a contingent to (the then) Zululand.

=== Absorption of the Transvaal Light Infantry ===
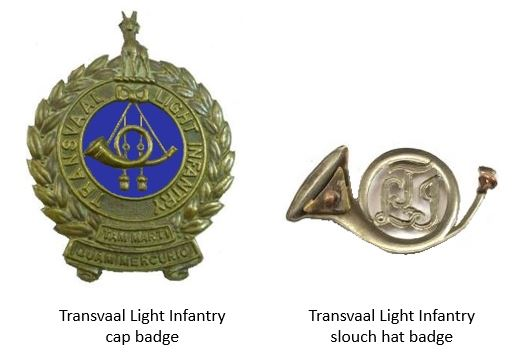
Transvaal Light Infantry insignia

In 1907 the regiment was further strengthened when it absorbed the Transvaal Light Infantry Regiment.

=== World War 1 ===
The regiment was mobilised again when World War I broke out.

==== German South West Africa ====
The first action that it took part in was the South African invasion of German South-West Africa (now Namibia).

After the successful conclusion of this campaign, virtually all members volunteered for overseas service.

==== Western Front ====
Most of the volunteers were consequently assigned to the 3rd South African Infantry Battalion. (Due to the South African military law of the time, soldiers could not be forced to serve overseas, nor could existing military units be deployed there.) The most well-known action that this unit took part in was the Battle of Delville Wood in the Somme.

==== East Africa ====
Other members of the regiment served in the Witwatersrand Rifles company of 7th Infantry ACF, which served in German East Africa against the forces of General von Lettow-Vorbeck.

=== Rand Revolt ===
The inter-war years saw the regiment deployed during the 1922 Rand Revolt, when rebellious South African Communist Party miners attempted to overthrow the government of General Jan Smuts.

In the early 1930s the regiment affiliated with the Cameronians (Scottish Rifles) Regiment of the British Army. As a consequence, the Witwatersrand Rifles adopted the uniform and many of the traditions of this Scottish Lowland regiment. Despite the Cameronians' disbandment in 1968, the Wits Rifles still continues this heritage today.

=== World War 2 ===
As a result of the outbreak of World War II in 1939, the regiment was expanded to two battalions. However, due to the battalions being used to supply replacements in a piecemeal fashion to depleted South African units taking part in the North African campaign, the Witwatersrand Rifles was only deployed as a coherent unit (to Egypt) in 1943.

During its service in North Africa, the Witwatersrand Rifles was amalgamated with Regiment de la Rey. This combined regiment, was nicknamed the "Royal Boere" and saw extensive action in Italy as part of the South African 6th Armoured Division, particularly at Monte Caprara and Monte Stanco.

=== Border War ===
From 1970 until the first all-race democratic elections in 1994, the regiment saw action in the South African Border War in South-West Africa (now Namibia) and Angola as well as on the South Africa/Botswana border and in South African townships.

=== Post 1994 ===
When conscription ended in 1993, the regiment began an active recruitment drive to maintain reserve troop strength. During South Africa's second democratic election in 1999, the regiment deployed 180 volunteers in support of the South African Police Service (SAPS).

Late in its history the Witwatersrand Rifles Regiment attracted volunteers for regular part-time training.

==== Scottish tradition ====
To maintain its Scottish links, the regiment had formed alliances with the Cameronians (Scottish Rifles) and the King's Own Scottish Borderers. Up to the disbandment and name change, members of the regiment continued to maintain their traditional Scottish Lowland uniforms and traditions and uphold very high standards of discipline and effective military training.

The regiment also had an active pipe band as well as one of the top shooting teams in the country and was ably supported by a Regimental Council, a very active Regimental Association and a Ladies Committee up to the point of the renaming process.

=== Peacekeeping ===
The Witwatersrand Rifles Regiment provided troops for internal operations in support of the South African Police Service and on the border (as part of Operation Corona) as well as for United Nations peacekeeping operations in the DRC and the Sudan.

=== Name Change ===
In August 2019, 52 Reserve Force units had their names changed to reflect the diverse military history of South Africa. The Witwatersrand Rifles became the Bambatha Rifles, and have 3 years to design and implement new regimental insignia.

== Freedom of Entry ==
The Regiment holds the Freedom of the Cities of Johannesburg and Germiston as well as the town of Barberton.

== Commanding officers ==
=== Colonel-in-Chief ===
(This Honorary post officially fell away in 1961 when the Union of South Africa became a Republic)

- HM Queen Elizabeth (The Queen Mother) (1947–1961) (unofficially 1947 – 2002)

=== Railway Pioneer Regiment ===
- Lt Col.J.E. Capper, RE (1899–1903) (Later Maj Gen. J.E. Capper, KCB KCVO)

=== Witwatersand Rifles ===
==== 1st Battalion ====
Leadership
From	Honorary Colonel	To	Ribbon
1908	Col Sir, L. Phillips – Bart	1937	
1909	Col R.W. Schumacher – Ffennel	1923	
1937	Col J.G. Hamilton	1971	
1937	Col The Hon. C.F. Stallard DSO,MC	1971	Distinguished Service Order DSO Military Cross MC
1972	Brig J.B. Bester	1985	
1985	Lt Gen. W.R. Van Der Riet SSA,SM,MC	1988	Star of South Africa SSA Southern Cross Medal SM Military Cross MC
1989	Maj Gen. W.N.A. Barends	2002	
2002	Col (Dr.) J.L. Job	2019	
From	Officer Commanding	To	Ribbon
1903	Lt Col J.G. Hamilton	c. 1905	
1906	Lt Col T.J. Macfarlane	c. 1908	
1908	Lt Col R.W. Schumacher – Ffennell	c. 1909	
1909	Lt Col C.B. Saner	c. 1912	
1912	Lt Col J.W. Smyth	c. 1919	
1919	Lt Col S.B. Schlam	c. 1923	
1923	Lt Col R. Dukoff – Gordon	c. 1928	
1928	Lt Col W.C.M. Howarth	c. 1931	
1931	Lt Col W. Crewe – Brown	c. 1936	
1936	Lt Col L.F. Sprenger	c. 1939	
1939	Lt Col W. James	c. 1942	
1942	Lt Col H.C. Sumner	c. 1943	
1943	Lt Col J.B. Bester	c. 1945	
1945	Lt Col W.R. Van Der Riet SSA,SM,MC (Note: Later Lieutenant General)	c. 1946	Star of South Africa SSA Southern Cross Medal SM Military Cross MC
1946	Lt Col G.M. St.L. Daines	c. 1951	
1951	Cmdt C.J.R. Nicholls	c. 1956	
1956	Cmdt E.C. Harris	c. 1962	
1962	Cmdt C.L. Pitt	c. 1965	
1965	Cmdt R.C. Gradige	c. 1968	
1968	Cmdt C.J. Derby–Lewis	c. 1973	
1973	Cmdt D.C. Fletcher	c. 1981	
1981	Cmdt (Dr.) J.L. Job	c. 1986	
1986	Cmdt A.E. Dixon – Seager	c. 1989	
1989	Lt Col K.J. Townsend	c. 1997	
1997	Lt Col E.L. Carton – Barber	c. 2002	
2002	Lt Col C.E. Casey	c. 2005	
2005	Lt Col M.F. Robberts	c. 2007	
2007	Lt Col J.C.L. Valentine	c. 2013	
2013	Lt Col L.H. Malakoane	c. 2014	
2014	Lt Col S.G. Mooketsi	c. 2015	
2015	Maj A.M. Mosehlana	c. 2016	
2016	Lt Col G. Mazibuko	c. 2019	
From	Regimental Sergeant Major	To	Ribbon
1903	Unknown	1910	
1910	WO1 . G. Eliot	1914	
1914	WO1 . G.H. Forsyth (Later Capt.)	1915	
1915	WO1 . W.K. Lawson	1916	
1916	WO1 . W.R. Watson	1917	
1917	WO1 . D. Smith	1918	
1918	Unknown	1932	
1932	WO1 . J. Suttie	1940	
1940	WO1 . E. Owen	1943	
1943	WO1 . C.H.C. Wheeler (KIA)	1944	
1944	WO1 . C.W.B. Walsh	1946	
1946	WO1 . R.W. Thorpe, JCD	1961	
1961	WO1 . A.J. Norton	1963	
1963	WO1 . R.W. Thorpe, JCD	1968	
1968	WO1 . D. Morton	1971	
1971	WO1 . J.M. Bruigom, PMM, JCD	1981	
1981	WO1 . M. Bonette, JCD	1988	
1988	WO1 . A.E. van den Berg, JCD	1992	
1992	WO1 . D.J. Vosloo, JCD	1997	
1997	SWO. D. Williams, JCD	2006	
2006	SWO. M.M. Motlohi	2019	

==== 2nd Battalion ====
Leadership
From	Honorary Colonel	To	Ribbon
	No known incumbents		
From	Officer Commanding	To	Ribbon
1940	Lt Col W.A.D. Cherrington	c. 1941	
From	Regimental Sergeant Major	To	Ribbon
c. 1940	WO1 . W. Watson	c. 1941	

== Regimental Symbols ==
- Regimental motto: "Pro Deo et Patria" (For God and Country). This motto was adopted in 1961, when the Republic of South Africa became a republic, prior to 1961 the motto was "Pro Deo et Rege et Patria" (For God, King and Country).
- Regimental march: "Within a Mile O' Edinburgh Town".
- Regimental anniversaries: Regimental Day (1 May), Monte Stanco Day (20 April).
- Regimental Freedoms: Germiston, Johannesburg, Barberton.
- Regimental badge: A Maltese cross within a wreath of ten Protea flowers, with a rifle on each side of the cross. The cross was surmounted by a stringed bugle and in the centre of the cross is a mine shaft in a circlet. At the top of the wreath is the Cameronian Star and on the base of the wreath is a scroll with the inscription "Pro Deo et Patria".
- Regimental headdress: Glengarry or Kilmarnoch with black hackle.
- Regimental tartan: Douglas (trews).

=== Previous Dress Insignia ===
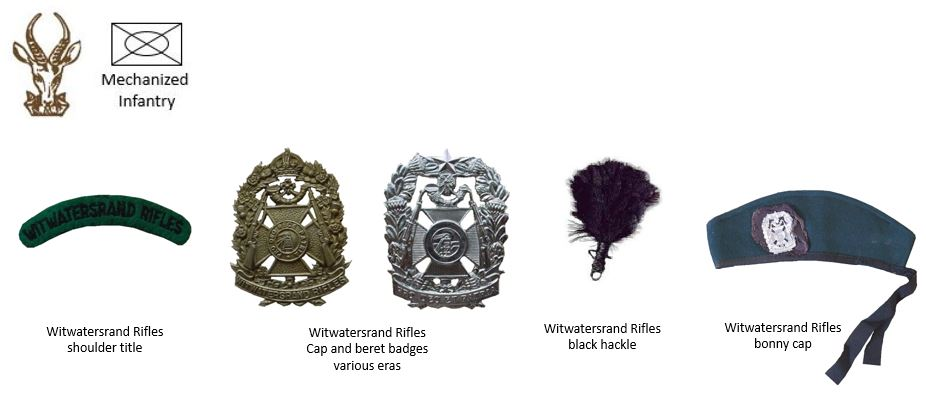
SADF era Witwatersrand Rifles insignia

=== Current Dress Insignia ===
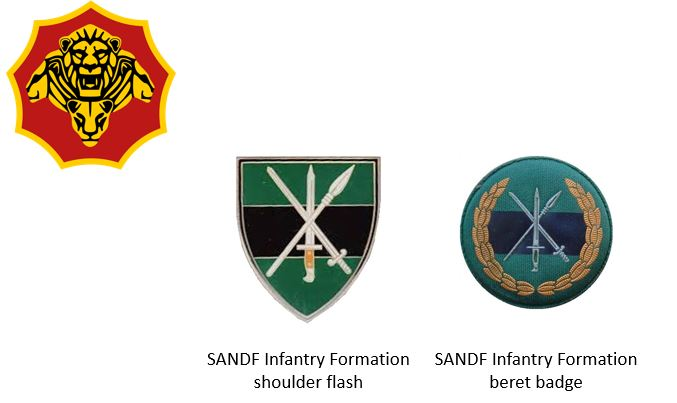
SANDF era Infantry Formation insignia

== Honours and Affiliations ==
=== Battle honours ===
As a Rifle regiment, the Witwatersrand Rifles did not carry colours. Instead the honours banner was displayed on the pipes of the Pipe Major. The Witwatersrand Rifles had the following battle honours:

- First World War:

South West Africa 1914–1915

- Second World War:

Italy 1944–45, Cassino II, Allerona, Florence, Monte Querciabella, Monte Fili, The Greve, Gothic Line, Monte Stanco, Monte Salvaro, Sole/Caprara, Po Valley, Campo Santo Bridge

Battle Honours
Awarded to Witwatersrand Rifles
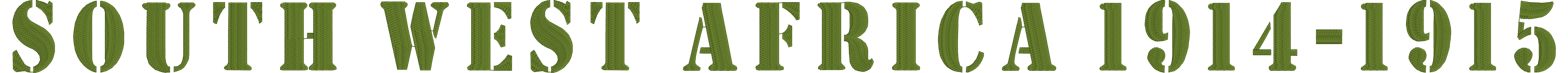
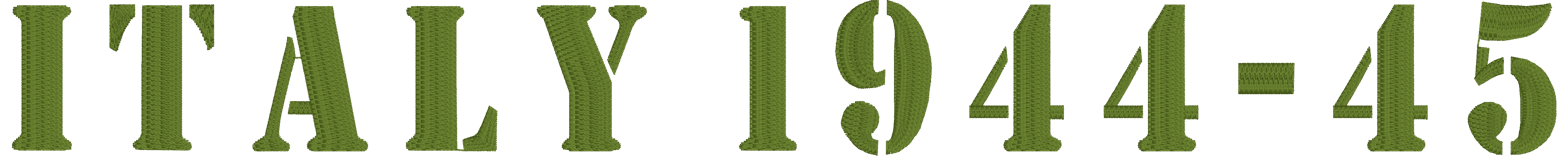
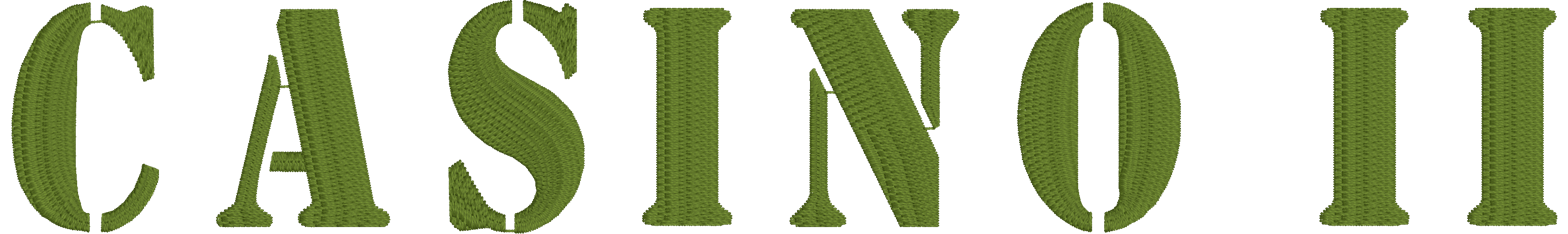
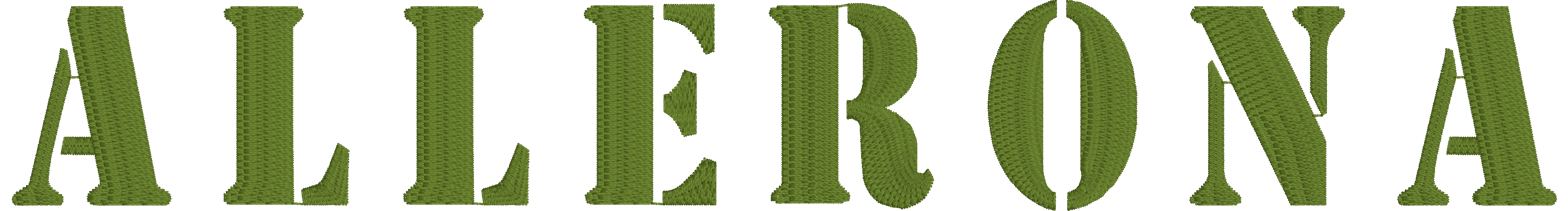
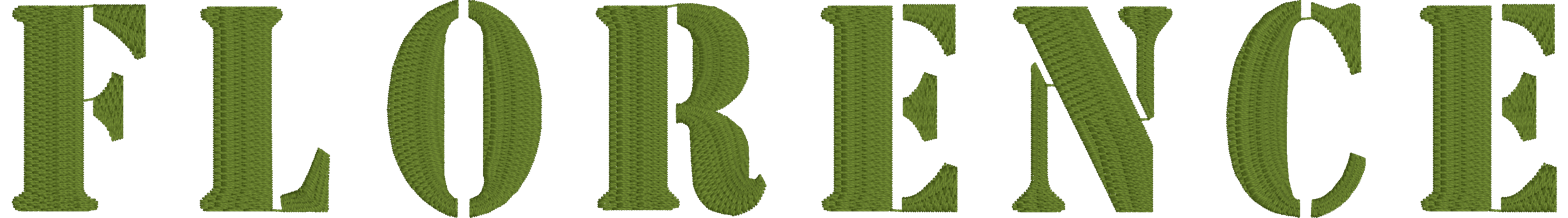
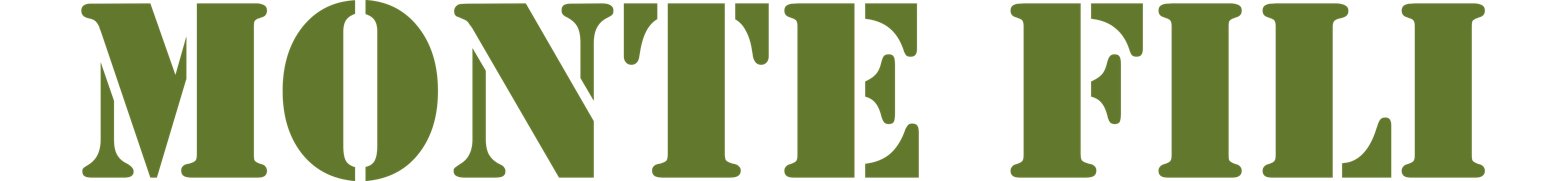
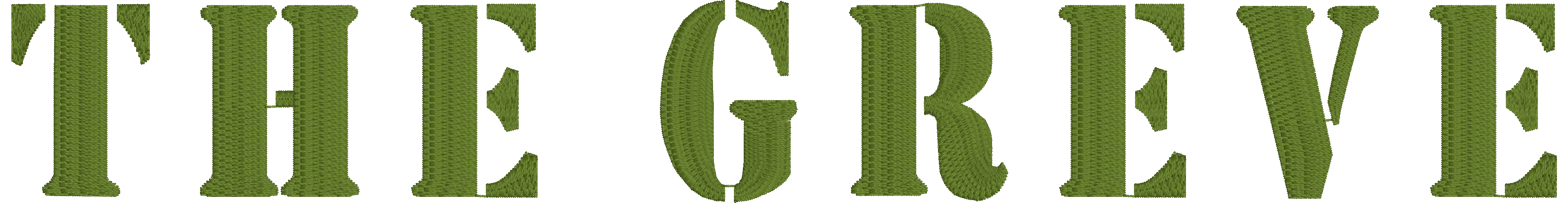
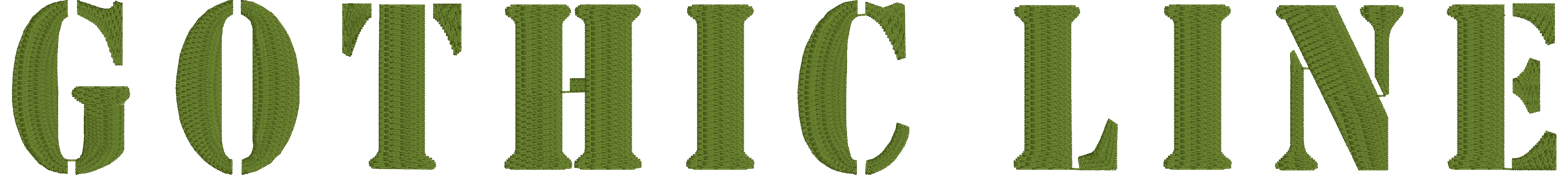
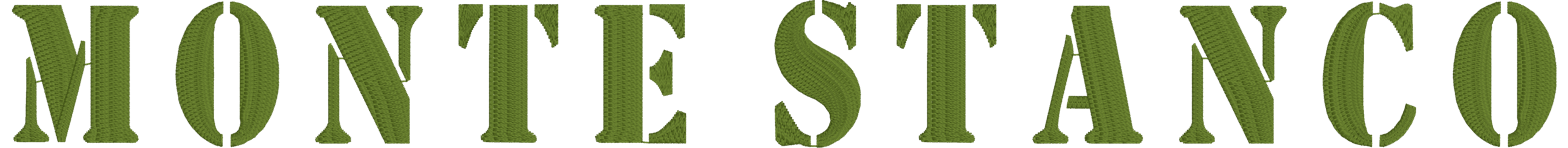
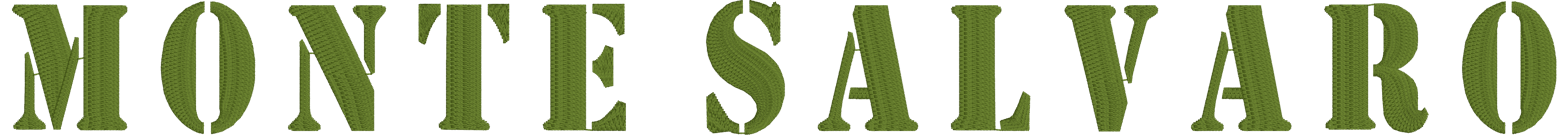
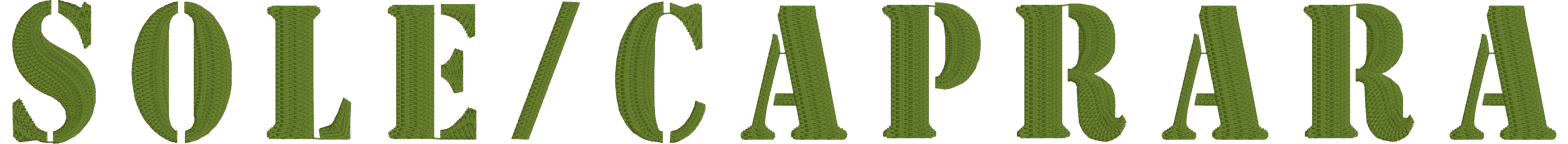
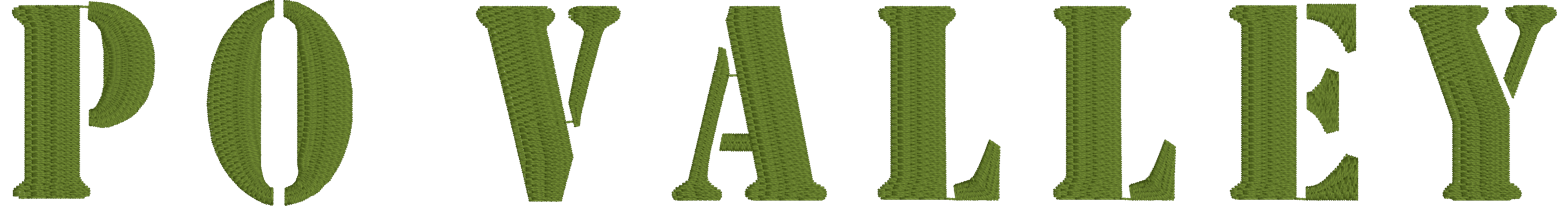

=== Sister Regiments ===
- South Africa – Transvaal Scottish Regiment
- South Africa – Regiment de la Rey

=== Alliances ===
- United Kingdom – The Royal Scots Borderers
- United Kingdom – Cameronians (Scottish Rifles)
