= Florence Ribeiro =

South African anti-apartheid activist

Florence Barbara Ribeiro SCOB (3 November 1933 – 1 December 1986) was a South African anti-apartheid activist who, along with her husband Fabian Ribeiro, were assassinated by South African government forces.

The post-Apartheid Truth and Reconciliation Commission found that when generals Jannie Geldenhuys and Ian Gleeson were informed that the SADF and Security Branch had assassinated Dr Fabian Ribeiro and his wife Florence on 1 December 1986 they failed to pass this information onto the Attorney-General or the police. The commission concluded that they both "acted in an obstructive way for which they are legally responsible". As part of the commission's hearings, it was alleged that Geldenhuys had also authorized the use of SADF special forces personnel to support the Security Branch's operations within South Africa; he denied having done so.

In May 2012, Queen Wilhelmina Street in Pretoria was renamed Florence Ribeiro Avenue.
