= 14 Squadron SAAF =

14 Squadron, SAAF
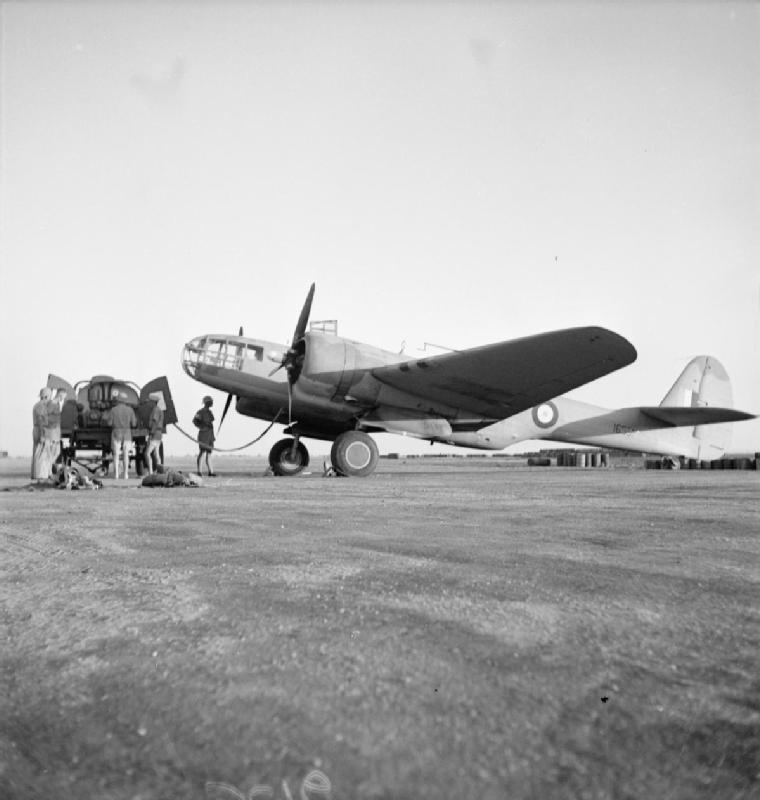
- 24 Sqn Maryland being refuelled at Ma'aten Bagush, Egypt
- Active: ??-21 April 1941
- Country: (South Africa)
- Branch: South African Air Force
- Role: Medium Bomber

14 Squadron was a South African Air Force Squadron during the Second World War. The Squadron was initially deployed to East Africa and was transferred to Egypt in April 1941 when hostilities ceased in East Africa. It had been partially re-equipped with Marylands in early 1941 and was fully converted to these aircraft once in Egypt. On arrival in Egypt, it was renamed 24 Squadron SAAF in order to prevent confusion with RAF No. 14 Squadron.
