= Attorney General Armstrong =

Attorney General Armstrong may refer to:

- David L. Armstrong (1941–2017), Attorney General of Kentucky
- William Nevins Armstrong (1835–1905), Attorney General of the Kingdom of Hawaii

== See also ==
- General Armstrong (disambiguation)
