= Werndly van der Riet =

Lieutenant General Werndly Renaut van der Riet SSA SM MC
- Born: 27 April 1914
- Died: 28 February 1987 (aged 72); Cape Town
- Spouse: Marijke van der Riet née Gesterkamp (died) Valerie Norma van der Riet née Geerdts ()
- Relatives: Col JMR "Manie" van der Riet - OC 3 South African Infantry Battalion (son)
- Military career
- Allegiance: South Africa
- Branch: South African Army
- Service years: 1935 – 1974
- Rank: Lieutenant General
- Nickname: Booysie
- Service number: 60663V / 01222082PE
- Unit: 1 Special Service Battalion
- Commands: Chief of Defence Staff; SA Army College; Witwatersrand Rifles Regiment; 1 Special Service Battalion
- Conflicts: World War II
- Awards
- Other work: Hon. Col. Wits Rifles

Lieutenant General Werndly Renaut Booysie van der Riet SSA SM MC (27 April 1914 – 28 February 1987) was a South African Army officer who served as Chief of the Defence Staff.

== Military career ==
He was awarded the Military Cross during World War II.

He commanded Witwatersrand Rifles Regiment from 1945 to 1946 and 1 Special Service Battalion from Oct 1953 to Dec 1960. He completed the British Army Staff Course at Camberley, Officer Commanding SA Army College. Acting Chief of Staff SADF before Toby Moll.

== Awards and decorations ==
General van der Riet was awarded the following:

- Star of South Africa (1952) (SSA)
- Southern Cross Medal (1952) (SM)
- Military Cross (MC) (Great Britain)
- Queen Elizabeth II Coronation Medal (Great Britain)
- Union Medal (South Africa)
- 1939–45 Star (Great Britain)
- Africa Star (Great Britain)
- Italy Star (Great Britain)
- Defence Medal (United Kingdom) (Great Britain)
- War Medal 1939–1945 (Great Britain)
- Africa Service Medal (WWII) (South Africa)

Honorary titles
Preceded by Jack Bester	Honorary Colonel Wits Rifles; 1985–1987	Succeeded by Bill Barends
Military offices
Vacant Title last held by Kalfie Martin	Chief of Defence Staff; 1972–1974	Succeeded by Raymond Armstrong
Preceded by Col PD de Lange	OC SA Army College; 1961–1963	Succeeded by Col Faan Hugo
Preceded by Carl Leisegang	OC SSB; 1953–1960	Succeeded by Faan Hugo
