= Order of the Star of South Africa =

- Type: Military and Civil National Order
- Awarded for: Meritorious service
- Country: South Africa
- Presented by: The State President and, from 1994, the President
- Eligibility: Military: General and flag officers. Non-Military: Civilians, senior police, prisons and intelligence officers, foreign military attachés
- Post-nominals: SSA, SSAS, CSSA, OSSA, MSSA
- Status: Discontinued in 2002
- Established: 1 July 1975
- Gold (SSA) and Silver (SSAS) Grand Cross (SSA) and Grand Officer (SSAS) Commander (CSSA), Officer (OSSA) and Member (MSSA) Ribbon bars of the Decorations of the Order

Pre-1994 & post-2002 orders of precedence
- Next (higher): Pre-1994 precedence: Order of the Southern Cross; Post-2002 precedence: Order of the Southern Cross
- Next (lower): Pre-1994 succession: Order for Meritorious Service; Post-2002 succession: Order of the Leopard

The Order of the Star of South Africa was a South African National Order that consisted of seven decorations in two military and five non-military classes. The order was discontinued on 2 December 2002.

== Institution ==
The Order of the Star of South Africa was instituted by the Republic of South Africa on 1 July 1975. The decorations of the order were awarded by the State President and, from 1994, the President of South Africa to general and flag officers of the South African Defence Force for services concerning national defence and security. It replaced the Star of South Africa decoration of 1952. A civilian division was added in 1978.

The order was named after the first large diamond to be found in South Africa, the Star of South Africa that was found on the banks of the Orange River in 1869 and that sparked the New Rush, leading to the establishment of Kimberley.

== Military division ==
The order was initially a purely military honour that was conferred on general and flag officers in two classes:

- The Star of South Africa, Gold, post-nominal letters SSA, for meritorious military service which promoted SADF efficiency and preparedness and made a valuable contribution to national security.
- The Star of South Africa, Silver, post-nominal letters SSAS, for exceptionally meritorious service of major military importance.

== Non-military division ==
The Order of the Star of South Africa was expanded on 17 October 1978 when a civilian division in five classes was added. These were bestowed on civilians in defence-related industries and organisations.

The five classes are:

- The Star of South Africa, Grand Cross, post-nominal letters SSA, for excellent meritorious service which made a lasting contribution to the security and general national interest of South Africa.
- The Star of South Africa, Grand Officer, post-nominal letters SSAS, for outstanding meritorious service which made a significant contribution to the security and general national interest of South Africa.
- The Star of South Africa, Commander, post-nominal letters CSSA, for exceptionally meritorious service which made a meaningful contribution to the security and general national interest of South Africa.
- The Star of South Africa, Officer, post-nominal letters OSSA, for meritorious service which made a contribution to the security and general national interest of South Africa.
- The Star of South Africa, Member, post-nominal letters MSSA, initially called "Knight" and in Afrikaans, "Ridder", for exceptional service.

In 1988 the Civilian Division was renamed the Non-military Division and eligibility for the honours was extended to include senior police, railways police, prisons and intelligence officers, as well as foreign military attachés. The post-nominal letters CSSA, OSSA and MSSA were retrospectively authorised for the non-military division in 2005.

== Description ==
The obverse of the order is a gold or silver Maltese cross, which is in blue enamel. Two four-pointed stars are superimposed on one another and, together, on the cross, with a diamond in the centre. The pre-1994 South African Coat of Arms is displayed on the reverse. The obverse of the SSA and SSAS classes in both divisions have protea flowers between the arms of the cross.

Ribbons

Each class has its own distinctive ribbon, the first three classes being worn around the neck, and the others on the chest. In the military division, the SSA ribbon is plain dark blue and the SSAS ribbon is dark blue with a white band down the centre. Until 1988 the Star of South Africa, Gold also had a gold neck chain for ceremonial occasions.

Breast star artwork

In the non-military division, the ribbons are dark blue with different combinations of orange and white bands:

- Orange edges for the SSA.
- White edges for the SSAS.
- White edges and an orange centre band for the CSSA.
- White edges and an orange centre band between two white bands for the OSSA.
- White edges and three white centre bands for the MSSA.

Breast stars

Eight-pointed breast stars, displaying the obverse of the decoration, are also worn by the SSA and SSAS recipients.

== Discontinuation ==
Conferment of the decoration was discontinued on 6 December 2002 when a new set of national orders was instituted. The order has no direct equivalent among the current South African national orders.
