= Star of South Africa, Gold =

- Type: Military decoration for merit
- Awarded for: Meritorious military service which promoted SADF efficiency and preparedness and made a valuable contribution to national security
- Country: South Africa
- Presented by: the State President of South Africa (until 1994); President of South Africa (1994–2002)
- Eligibility: General and flag officers
- Post-nominals: SSA
- Status: Discontinued in 2002
- Established: 1975
- Ribbon bar

SADF pre-1994 & SANDF post-2002 orders of wear
- Next (higher): SADF precedence: Honoris Crux Gold; SANDF precedence: Nkwe ya Gauta
- Equivalent: Star of South Africa, Grand Cross
- Next (lower): SADF succession: Star of South Africa, Silver; SANDF succession: Star of South Africa, Silver

The Star of South Africa, Gold, post-nominal letters SSA, is the senior decoration of two military and five non-military classes of the Order of the Star of South Africa, a South African Order which was instituted in 1975, and awarded to general and flag officers of the South African Defence Force. The Order of the Star of South Africa was discontinued in 2002.

== Background ==
The Union Defence Forces (UDF) were established in 1912 and renamed the South African Defence Force (SADF) in 1958. On 27 April 1994, it was integrated with six other independent forces into the South African National Defence Force (SANDF) after the end of apartheid.

== Institution ==
The Star of South Africa, Gold, post-nominal letters SSA, was instituted by the State President on 1 July 1975, as the senior decoration of two military classes of the Order of the Star of South Africa. The Order was named after the first large diamond to be found in South Africa, the Star of South Africa, which was found on the banks of the Orange River in 1869 and which sparked the New Rush, leading to the establishment of Kimberley.

The Order of the Star of South Africa was expanded on 17 October 1978, when a non-military division with decorations in five classes was instituted, for conferment on civilians and, from 1988, on senior police, prisons service and intelligence service officers, as well as foreign military attachés. The senior of these five non-military decorations, the Star of South Africa, Grand Cross, ranks on par with the Star of South Africa, Gold.

== Award criteria ==
The Star of South Africa, Gold was awarded to general and flag officers of the South African Defence Force for meritorious military service which promoted SADF efficiency and preparedness and made a valuable contribution to national security. It replaced the Star of South Africa of 1952.

In 1977, recipients of the Star of South Africa of 1952 were promoted to the new Order of the Star of South Africa, by being presented with the Star of South Africa, Gold in substitution of their existing decorations.

== Order of wear ==
The position of the Star of South Africa, Gold in the official order of precedence was revised three times after 1975, to accommodate the inclusion or institution of new decorations and medals, first upon the integration into the South African National Defence Force on 27 April 1994, again in April 1996, when decorations and medals were belatedly instituted for the two former non-statutory forces, the Azanian People's Liberation Army and Umkhonto we Sizwe, and finally with the institution of a new set of awards on 27 April 2003.

South African Defence Force until 26 April 1994

- Official SADF order of precedence:
  - Preceded by the Honoris Crux Gold (HCG).
  - Succeeded by the Star of South Africa, Silver (SSAS).
- Official national order of precedence:
  - Preceded by the Order of the Southern Cross, Gold (OSG).
  - Succeeded by the Order for Meritorious Service, Gold (OMSG).

South African National Defence Force from 27 April 1994

- Official SANDF order of precedence:
  - Preceded by the Honoris Crux Gold (HCG) of the Republic of South Africa.
  - Succeeded by the Star of South Africa, Silver (SSAS) of the Republic of South Africa.
- Official national order of precedence:
  - Preceded by the Order of the Southern Cross, Gold (OSG) of the Republic of South Africa.
  - Succeeded by the Order of the Leopard, Special Class Grand Cross of the Republic of Bophuthatswana.

South African National Defence Force from April 1996

- Official SANDF order of precedence:
  - Preceded by the Star for Bravery in Gold (SBG) of Umkhonto we Sizwe.
  - Succeeded by the Star of South Africa, Silver (SSAS) of the Republic of South Africa.
- Official national order of precedence:
  - Preceded by the Order of the Southern Cross, Gold (OSG) of the Republic of South Africa.
  - Succeeded by the Order of the Leopard, Special Class Grand Cross of the Republic of Bophuthatswana.

South African National Defence Force from 27 April 2003

- Official SANDF order of precedence:
  - Preceded by the Nkwe ya Gauta (NG) of the Republic of South Africa.
  - Succeeded by the Star of South Africa, Silver (SSAS) of the Republic of South Africa.
- Official national order of precedence:
  - Preceded by the Order of the Southern Cross, Gold (OSG) of the Republic of South Africa.
  - Succeeded by the Order of the Leopard, Special Class Grand Cross of the Republic of Bophuthatswana.

== Description ==
The Star of South Africa, Gold consists of five separate items.

- A full size decoration with a neck chain.
- A full size decoration with a neck ribbon.
- A full size decoration with a smaller suspender, for mounting in a breast medal rack.
- A miniature decoration for mess dress or formal evening dress.
- A breast star.

Obverse

The Star of South Africa, Gold is a silver-gilt Maltese cross, with the arms in dark blue enamel, with protea flowers between the arms of the cross. Two four-pointed stars, superimposed on one another, are mounted on the cross.

Breast star

Reverse

The reverse has the pre-1994 South African Coat of Arms.

Ribbon and chain

The decoration is worn around the neck on a dark blue ribbon, 35 millimetres wide. Until 1988, the Star of South Africa, Gold also had a gold neck chain for ceremonial occasions.

Breast star

Recipients also wear a gold breast star, with eight multi-rayed points, which displays the obverse of the decoration in its centre.

== Discontinuation ==
The conferment of the Star of South Africa, Gold was discontinued on 6 December 2002, when a new set of national orders was instituted.

== List of recipients ==
This is non-exhaustive list of the general and flag officers who were awarded the SSA in no chronological sequence:

- Adm Hugo Biermann OBE - Chief of the SADF
- Gen Magnus Malan SM - Chief of the SADF
- Gen Constand Viljoen SSAS, SM - Chief of the SADF
- Gen Johannes Geldenhuys SSAS, SD, SOE, SM - Chief of the SADF
- Gen Andreas Liebenberg SSAS, SD, SM, MMM - Chief of the SADF
- Gen Georg Meiring SSAS, SD, SM, MMM - Chief of the SANDF
- Gen Siphiwe Nyanda DMG, MMS, MMM - Chief of the SANDF
- V Adm Bert Bekker SSAS, SD, SM - Chief of Defence Force Staff
- Lt Gen Denis Earp SSAS, SD, SOE, SM - Chief of the Air Force
- Lt Gen Ian Gleeson SSAS, SD, SM - Chief of Defence Force Staff
- Lt Gen (Dr) Nicolaas Nieuwoudt SD, SM - Surgeon General
- V Adm James Johnson SM, DSC - Chief of the Navy
- Lt Gen Robert 'Bob' Rogers SM, DSO, DFC - Chief of the Air Force
- Lt Gen (Prof) Heinrich de V. du Toit SD, SM - Chief of Staff Intelligence
- V Adm Ronald A. Edwards SSAS, SD, SM - Chief of the Navy
- Lt Gen Raymond Holtzhausen SD, SM - Chief of Staff Personnel
- Cmdt Piet Marais - Chairman of ARMSCOR 1976-1989
