= Order of the Leopard (Bophuthatswana) =

Order of Bophuthatswana

The Order of the Leopard is a merit order of the former Republic of Bophuthatswana. The Order was instituted in order to recognise service to the people of the Republic of Bophuthatswana. It was instituted by the President of the Republic of Bophuthatswana by official Warrant on 28 December 1979.

== Award Criteria ==
The Order was instituted in order to recognise persons, whether civilian or military and whether citizens of a foreign country or citizens of Bophuthatswana who have distinguished themselves by their services to Bophuthatswana in the field of international relations or by acts in the interest of the people of Bophuthatswana.

== Classes ==
The Order was initially divided into the following classes:

1. Special Class: Grand Cross
2. First Class: Grand Commander
3. Second Class: Commander
4. Third Class: Officer

In 1992 the Order of the Leopard, Military Division, Commander was also created as part of the Order and which, in its appearance, resembled (and was succeeded in the BDF order of precedence by) the Distinguished Gallantry Cross.

== Eligibility ==
According to the 1979 Warrant, the following persons were eligible for the award:

=== Special Class: Grand Cross ===
Heads of State and Prime Ministers.

=== First Class: Grand Commander ===
Ministers of State, Judges of the Supreme Courts, Presidents of Legislative Bodies, Secretaries of State, Ambassadors Extraordinary and Plenipotentiary, Commanders in Chief of the Armed Forces, other functionaries of comparable rank, and such persons as the Executive Council of Bophuthatswana designated as suitable recipients of this class of the Order.

=== Second Class: Commander ===
Members of Legislative Bodies, Envoys Extraordinary and Ministers Plenipotentiary Charge d' Affaires, general officers of Armed Forces, Counsellors of Diplomatic Missions, Consuls-General, Colonels or Lieutenant Colonels or equivalent rank, other functionaries of comparable rank, advisers, and such persons as the Executive Council of Bophuthatswana designated as suitable recipients of this class of the Order.

=== Third Class: Officer ===
Secretaries of Diplomatic Missions, Consuls, lower ranking officers of the Armed Forces, other functionaries of comparable rank and station, and such persons as the Executive Council of Bophuthatswana designated as suitable recipients of this class of the Order.

== Description ==
=== Civil Division ===
The Insignia of the Order comprised a Badge, a Star, a Sash, a Riband and a Miniature.

The Badge of the Order is described as being in the form of an eight-pointed star with the vertical rays somewhat longer than the others with obverse and reverse medallions. The obverse medallion bears a leopard head in gold on a circular enamel background composed of a red outer circle around a green inner circle. The reverse medallion bears the coat of arms of the Republic of Bophuthatswana within a circle of blue enamel. The badge is executed in silver plated with gold and measures 90mm from top to bottom. In the case of the Third Class the badge is executed in silver without gold plating.

The Star of the Order is in the form of an eight-pointed star multi-rayed star with the obverse of the badge of the Order super-imposed on it to form a harmonious whole. The reverse is omitted. The star measures 110mm across its widest points and is executed in gilt. The star is worn on the left breast.

The Sash of the Order is made of woven cloth of a royal blue colour. The badge of the Order hangs from the bow of the sash, if the sash is worn. It is worn over the right shoulder with the bow on the left hip.

The Riband of the Order is made of woven watered silk 35mm wide of cobalt blue with cadmium orange edgings on both sides of the ribbon. The riband is worn as a necklet with the badge of the Order as a pendant in the case of the First and Second Class. In the Third Class it is worn as a medal ribbon with the badge on the left breast. In the Special Class the riband is worn as a necklet with the badge of the Order as a pendant if the sash is not worn.

The Miniature Badge of the Order is a miniature of the Badge measuring 20mm in diameter and is worn as a miniature medal pendant from a miniature of the riband measuring 15mm wide.

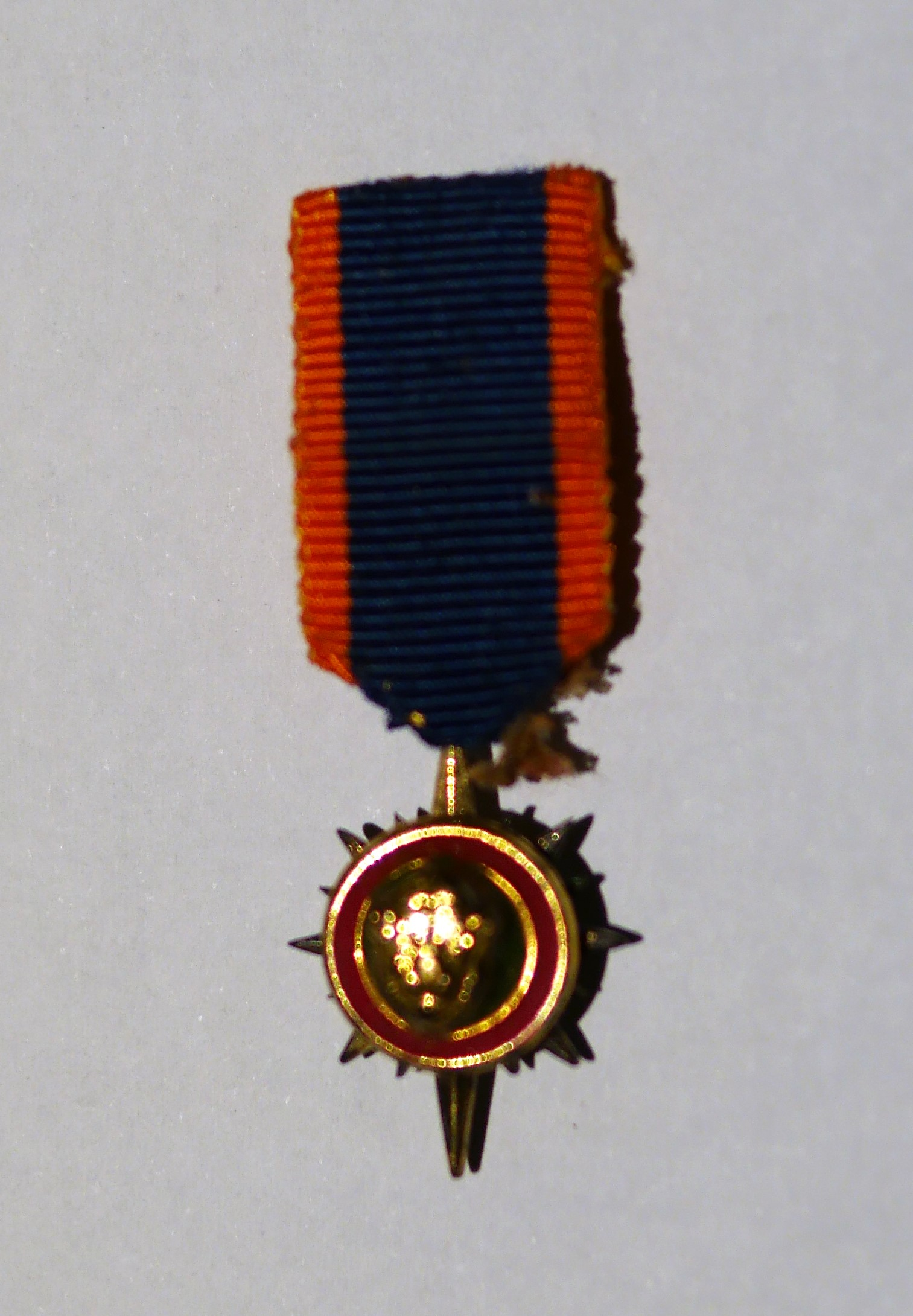
Miniature of the Order of the Leopard

=== Military Division (1992 - 1994) ===
The Badge of the Order of the Leopard, Military Division: Commander is described as being a blue and gold convex cross which is made of silver plated with gold. The obverse features a cadmium orange border surrounding a white enamel circle within which is imposed a leopard's head. The reverse is similar but features the coat of arms of the Republic of Bophuthatswana in place of the leopard's head.

The ribbon of the Military Division is made of royal blue silk, with royal blue edging, separated by two orange bands. A single white band runs within both orange bands.

== Order of Wear ==
=== Bophuthatswana Defence Force until 26 April 1994 ===
==== Order of the Leopard (Military Division): Commander (1992 - 1994) ====
- Succeeded in precedence by the Distinguished Gallantry Cross

The Order of the Leopard was authorised for wear by a statutory force which was, on 27 April 1994, incorporated into the South African National Defence Force. Its various classes received positions in the official order of precedence within the South African military decorations order of wear.

=== South African National Defence Force after 27 April 1994 ===
Ribbon - Order of the Leopard

Order of the Leopard, Special Class: Grand Cross (1979 - 1992)

- Preceded in precedence by the Order of the Star of South Africa (Military) Class I: Gold and (Non-Military) Class I: Grand Cross (Gold).
- Succeeded by Order of Thohoyandou, Special Class: Grand Cross.

==== Order of the Leopard, Grand Commander (1979 - 1992) ====
- Preceded by the Order of the Star of South Africa (Military), Class II: Silver and Non-Military, Class II: Grand Officer.
- Succeeded by the Order of the Leopard: Class I, Grand Commander.

==== Order of the Leopard, Class I: Grand Commander (1992 - 1994) ====
- Preceded by the Order of the Leopard, Grand Commander (1979 - 1992).
- Succeeded by Order of Thohoyandou: Grand Commander (1981 - 1994).

==== Order of the Leopard, Commander (1979 - 1992) ====
- Preceded in precedence by the Order of the Aloe, Transkei
- Succeeded by the Order of the Leopard, Class II: Commander (1992 - 1994)

==== Order of the Leopard, Class II: Grand Commander (1992 - 1994) ====
- Preceded in precedence by the Order of the Leopard: Commander (1979 - 1992)
- Succeeded by the Order of the Leopard (Military Division): Commander (1992 - 1994)

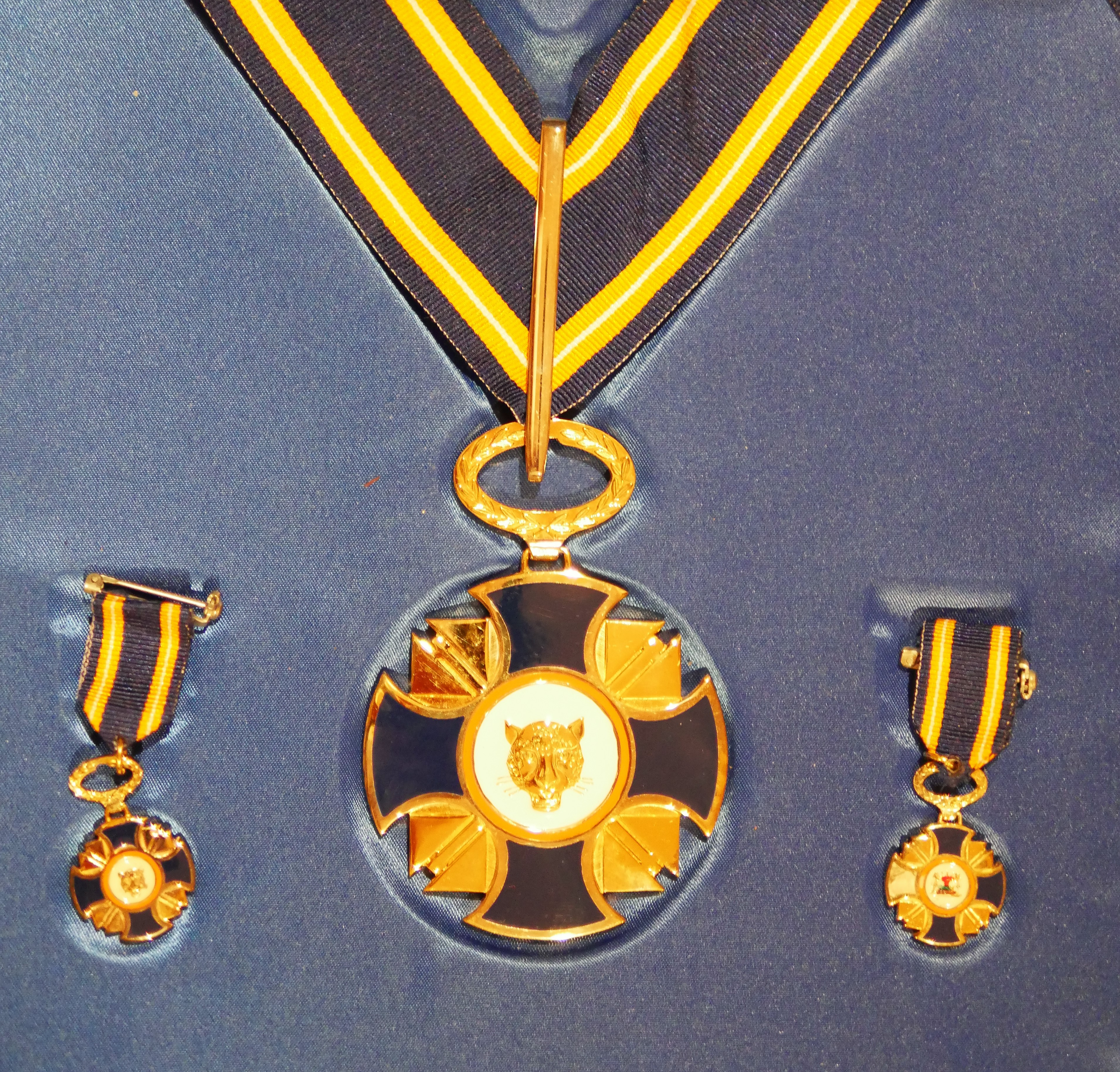
Badge of the Order of the Leopard (Military Division) (1992 - 1994)

==== Order of the Leopard (Military Division): Commander (1992 - 1994) ====
- Preceded in precedence by the Order of the Leopard, Class II: Grand Commander (1992 - 1994)
- Succeeded by the Order of Thohoyandou: Commander

== Recipients ==
- Frank Sinatra was the first foreigner to receive the Order of the Leopard. The award was conferred on Frank Sinatra by President Lucas Mangope in 1981, when Sinatra performed at Sun City.
- Photographs of President Lucas Mangope depict him wearing the Badge of the Order of the Leopard and the Order of the Leopard (Military Division): Commander

== Discontinuation ==
The Order of the Leopard was discontinued when the Republic of Bophuthatswana ceased to exist on 27 April 1994.
