= Order of Good Hope =

South African order of merit

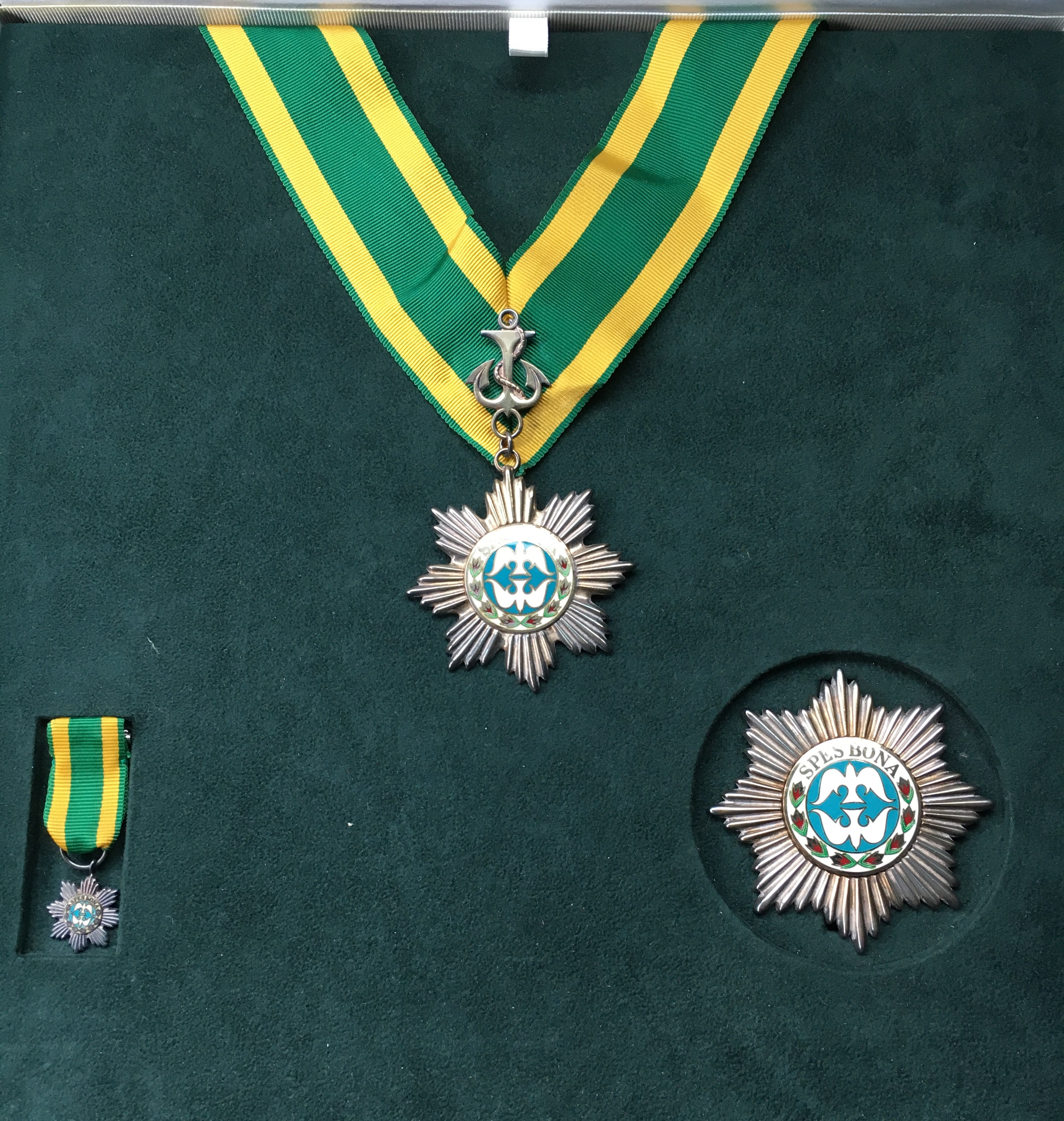
- Grand Officer set of the Order of Good Hope

Awarded by South Africa
- Type: Order
- Motto: Spes Bona (Latin, "Good Hope")
- Awarded for: Foreigners for promoting international relations and the interests of South Africa. Between 1980 and 1988 it was also awarded to South African citizens.
- Status: Dormant
- Grades: Grand Cross; Grand Officer; Commander; Officer; Member (88-02)
- Former grades: Grand Collar (73-88)

Statistics
- First induction: 1973
- Last induction: 2000
- Ribbon bar of the order

The Order of Good Hope or Order of the Cape of Good Hope is a dormant order of merit of the Republic of South Africa.

== History ==
The Order of Good Hope was established by the South African government in 1973, as a diplomatic order intended primarily for foreign nationals who had promoted international relations or rendered services to South Africa. Its creation followed South Africa's departure from the Commonwealth in 1961 and the gradual replacement of British imperial honours with a distinct South African honours system. The order became an important instrument of South African diplomacy during the apartheid era, particularly as the government sought international recognition amid growing political isolation.

Following the end of apartheid, the South African honours system underwent significant reform under the new democratic government. President Nelson Mandela that individuals who had supported the anti-apartheid liberation struggle should also be recognized during his presidency. The Order of Good Hope, which had been closely associated with South Africa's apartheid-era diplomatic system, was eventually replaced by the Order of the Companions of O. R. Tambo in 2002 as part of a broader restructuring of national honours.

== Classes ==
Awarded to foreign citizens (and, from 1980 to 1988, to South Africans too), for promoting international relations with the increasingly isolated apartheid state. The order was originally divided into five classes:

- Grand Collar – for heads of state only.
- Grand Cross – for heads of government, ministers of state, judges, presidents of legislatures, secretaries of state, ambassadors, commanders-in-chief, and others.
- Grand Officer – for legislators, envoys, senior military officers, and others.
- Commander – for chargés d'affaires, consuls-general, colonels, and others.
- Officer – for consuls, lower-ranking military officers, and others.

The order was reorganised in 1988:

- Grand Cross – for excellent meritorious service (heads of state and, in special cases, heads of government).
- Grand Officer – for outstanding meritorious service (heads of government, ministers of state, judges, presidents of legislatures, secretaries of state, ambassadors, commanders-in-chief, and others).
- Commander – for exceptionally meritorious service (legislators, envoys, senior military officers, and others).
- Officer – for meritorious service (chargés d'affaires, consuls-general, colonels, and others).
- Member – for exceptional service (consuls, lower-ranking military officers, and others).

== Notable recipients of the Grand-Collar (non-exhaustive list) ==
- Alfredo Stroessner, President of Paraguay in 1974
- John McCain, United States Senator from Arizona in 1987

== Notable recipients of the Grand-Cross (non-exhaustive list) ==
- Fredrick Chien, Vice Minister of Foreign Affairs of the Republic of China in 1979.
- Pik Botha, South African Minister of Foreign Affairs in 1980.
- Margaret Thatcher, former Prime Minister of the United Kingdom in 1991.
- François Mitterrand, President of France in 1994
- Robert Mugabe, President of Zimbabwe in 1994
- Emperor Akihito of Japan in 1995
- Queen Elizabeth II, Former Queen of South Africa in 1995
- Zine El Abidine Ben Ali, President of Tunisia in 1995
- Joaquim Chissano, President of Mozambique in 1995
- King Mswati III of Swaziland in 1995
- Sheikh Isa bin Salman Al Khalifa (Bahrain) in 1995
- Sheikh Zayed bin Sultan Al Nahyan (United Arab Emirates) in 1995
- Queen Margrethe II of Denmark in 1996
- Queen Beatrix of the Netherlands in 1996
- Jacques Chirac, President of France in 1996
- Sam Nujoma, President of Namibia in 1996
- Muammar Gaddafi, Brotherly Leader of Libya in 1997
- Hosni Mubarak, President of Egypt in 1997
- King Carl XVI Gustaf of Sweden in 1997
- Martti Ahtisaari, President of Finland in 1997
- Suharto, President of Indonesia in 1997
- Yoweri Museveni, President of Uganda in 1997
- King Harald V of Norway in 1998
- Bill Clinton, President of the United States of America in 1998
- Fidel Castro, First Secretary of the Communist Party of Cuba in 1998
- Yasser Arafat in 1998
- King Juan Carlos I of Spain in 1999
- Queen Sofía of Spain in 1999
- Prince Claus of the Netherlands in 1999
- Sultan Qaboos bin Said al Said of Oman in 1999
- Jiang Zemin, General Secretary of the Chinese Communist Party in 1999
- Boris Yeltsin, President of Russia in 1999

== Sources ==
- Medals of the world
- South African Government site
  - Table of precedence
