= Fabian Ribeiro =

South African doctor and activist

Fabian Defu Ribeiro SCOB (29 June 1933 – 1 December 1986) was a South African doctor and anti-apartheid activist who, along with his wife Florence, was assassinated by South African government forces.

Ribeiro studied at the University of Fort Hare and the University of Natal, and in 1961 opened a surgery practice in Mamelodi, where he worked until his death. He had initially considered the Roman Catholic priesthood but changed his mind, while remaining a devoted practising Catholic. During the 1970’s he recorded evidence of police brutality by taking pictures of victims who came to him for treatment. In 1980 he was imprisoned for a few months on charges of treason, but was successfully defended by George Bizos.

On 1 December 1986, the Ribeiros were gunned down at the kitchen door of their house. The Truth and Reconciliation Commission found that they were killed by a joint operation by South African Special Forces and the Northern Transvaal Security Branch. Applicants for amnesty claimed that "the Ribeiros were targeted because Dr Ribeiro provided medical assistance to people injured in security force action and allegedly provided financial assistance to those wishing to leave the country," but were "unable to provide one specific case of support".

In 2004, Ribeiro was awarded the Order of the Baobab in Gold for "dedicating his life to serve the oppressed and for his outstanding contribution to the struggle for an equal, just and democratic society."
