= Order for Meritorious Service =

South African civilian award

- Order for Meritorious Service, Gold
- Type: Civil National Order
- Awarded for: Exceptional public service
- Country: South Africa
- Presented by: the State President and, from 1994, the President
- Eligibility: South African citizens
- Post-nominals: Gold - OMSG; Silver - OMSS
- Status: Discontinued in 2003
- Established: 1986
- Final award: 2002
- 1986 and 1996 ribbon bars

Pre-1994 & post-2002 orders of wear
- Next (higher): Order for Meritorious Service, Gold, Pre-1994 precedence: Star of South Africa, Gold and Star of South Africa, Grand Cross; Post-2002 precedence: Order of Thohoyandou, Special Class, Grand Cross; Order for Meritorious Service, Silver, Pre-1994 precedence: Star of South Africa, Silver and Star of South Africa, Grand Officer; Post-2002 precedence: Order of Indwe, Class I
- Next (lower): Order for Meritorious Service, Gold, Pre-1994 succession: Order of Good Hope, Class I, Grand Collar/Grand Cross; Post-2002 succession: Order of Transkei, Class I, Grand Cross; Order for Meritorious Service, Silver, Pre-1994 succession: Order of Good Hope, Class II, Grand Officer, Silver; Post-2002 succession: Order of Transkei, Class II, Grand Officer

The Order for Meritorious Service is a South African National Order that consisted of two classes, in gold and silver, and was awarded to deserving South African citizens. The order was discontinued on 2 December 2002.

== Institution ==
The Order for Meritorious Service was instituted by the Republic of South Africa in 1986, by Warrant published in Government Gazette no. 10493 dated 24 October 1986. It superseded the earlier Decoration for Meritorious Services. The order could be awarded in two classes:

- The Order for Meritorious Service, Class I, Gold, post-nominal letters OMSG, for exceptional merit.
- The Order for Meritorious Service, Class II, Silver, post-nominal letters OMSS, for outstanding merit.

== Award criteria ==
The Order was awarded by the State President and, from 1994, the President, to South Africans who had rendered exceptional public service. Recipients included cabinet ministers, judges, captains of commerce and industry, church leaders, academics, sports stars and prominent figures in the arts and sciences.

== Order of wear ==
The positions of the two classes of the Order for Meritorious Service in the official order of precedence were revised three times after 1986 to accommodate the inclusion or institution of new decorations and medals, first with the integration process of 1994, again when decorations and medals were belatedly instituted in April 1996 for the two former non-statutory para-military forces, the Azanian People's Liberation Army and Umkhonto we Sizwe, and again with the institution of new sets of awards in 2002 and 2003.

=== Order for Meritorious Service, Gold ===
Official national order of precedence until 26 April 1994

- Preceded by the Star of South Africa, Gold and Star of South Africa, Grand Cross.
- Succeeded by the Order of Good Hope, Class I, Grand Collar/Grand Cross.

Official national order of precedence from 27 April 1994

- Preceded by the Order of Thohoyandou, Special Class, Grand Cross of the Republic of Venda.
- Succeeded by the Order of Transkei, Class I, Grand Cross (GCT) of the Republic of Transkei.

The position of the Order for Meritorious Service, Gold in the South African order of precedence remained unchanged, as it was on 27 April 1994, when new awards were instituted in 1996, 2002 and 2003.

=== Order for Meritorious Service, Silver ===
Official national order of precedence until 26 April 1994

- Preceded by the Star of South Africa, Silver and Star of South Africa, Grand Officer.
- Succeeded by the Order of Good Hope, Class II, Grand Officer, Silver.

Official national order of precedence from 27 April 1994

- Preceded by the Order of Indwe, Class I of the Republic of Ciskei.
- Succeeded by the Order of Transkei, Class II, Grand Officer (GOT) of the Republic of Transkei.

The position of the Order for Meritorious Service, Silver in the South African order of precedence remained unchanged, as it was on 27 April 1994, when new awards were instituted in 1996, 2002 and 2003.

== Description ==
Both classes share the same ribbon and are worn around the neck.

Obverse

The badge of the Order is a white-enamelled gold or silver gable cross that displays the national arms on a shield in the centre of a smaller gold or silver cross paty.

Reverse

The reverse has the pre-1994 South African Coat of Arms.

Breast star

Suspender

The suspender is in the form of the crest of the pre-1994 South African Coat of Arms, a lion holding four staves to represent the four provinces of the Union of South Africa, above an outline of an inverted gable.

Breast star

The breast star consists of the badge of the order superimposed on a four-pointed multi-rayed diagonal star.

Ribbon

The original ribbon was 35 millimetres wide and in the colours of the 1928 South African flag, with a 6 millimetres wide dark blue band, a 4 millimetres wide white band and a 5½ millimetres wide orange band, repeated in reverse order and separated by a 4 millimetres wide white band.

A new ribbon was introduced in 1996, in the colours of the new post-1994 South African flag. It is also 35 millimetres wide with (approximate widths) a 2 millimetres wide red band, a 2 millimetres wide white band, a 7½ millimetres wide green band and a 5 millimetres wide yellow band, repeated in reverse order and separated by a 2 millimetres wide black band, but with the red band at left replaced by a 2 millimetres wide blue band at right.

== Discontinuation ==
Conferment of the decoration was discontinued in 2003 when a new set of national orders was instituted.

== Recipients ==
The known recipients are listed in the table.

Class	Name	Year
Gold	Abdurahman, A. †	2003
Silver	Baard. Frances †	2003
Gold	Biko, Stephen Bantu †	2003
Silver	Bizos, George	1999
Silver	Boonzaier, Gregoire Johannes	2003
Silver	Brownell, Frederick Gordon	2000
Gold	Cadman, Radclyffe Macbeth	1987
Gold	Dadoo, Yusuf Mohamed †	2003
Gold	Dyer, Henry Brooke	1998
Gold	du Plessis, Hubert	1992
Silver	Eybers, Elisabeth Françoise	2003
Gold	Fischer, Abram Louis †	2003
Gold	Gear, James Henderson Sutherland	1989
Silver	Gwangwa, J.	2003
Gold	HurIey, Denis Eugene	2003
Silver	Ibrahim, A.	2003
Gold	Joseph, Helen Beatrice †	2003
Gold	Kathrada, Ahmed Mohamed	2003
Silver	Kuzwayo, E.	2003
Gold	Kies, B. †	2003
Gold	Klaaste, Aggrey Zola	2003
Gold	Kotane, Moses Mauane †	2003
Silver	Mafikeng, E. †	2003
Silver	Magubane, Peter	1999
Silver	Makeba, Zenzile Miriam	2003
Gold	Malan, Magnus André de Merindol	c. 1987
Gold	Mangeni, Andrew Mokete	2003
Gold	Marks, J.B. †	2003
Silver	Masekela, Hugh Ramopolo	2003
Silver	Matomela, F. †	2003
Silver	Matshikiza, Todd Tozama †	2003
Gold	Mbeki, Mvuyelwa Govan Archibald †	2003
Silver	Mbeki, Zanele	2003
Silver	Meer, Fatima	2003
Gold	Mhlaba. Raymond	2003
Gold	Mkwayi, Wilton	2003
Silver	Mntwana, Ida Flyo †	2003
Silver	Molale, Kate †	2003
Silver	Moloi, L.S.L.N.	2003
Silver	Mompati, Ruth Segomotsi	2003
Gold	Motlana, Nthato Harrison	2003
Gold	Motsoaledi, Mathope Elias †	2003
Silver	Mpetha, Oscar †	2003
Gold	Ngoyi, Lillian Masediba †	2003
Gold	Nokwe, Philemon Pearce Dumasile †	2003
Silver	Nyembe, Dorothy †	2003
Gold	Oppenheimer, Harry Frederick	2003
Gold	Rupert, Anthony Edward	2003
Silver	Schoeman, Karel	2003
Gold	Schwarz, Harry Heinz	1988
Silver	September, H. †	2003
Silver	Shope, Gertrude	2003
Silver	Simons, Rachel Alexandrovich	2003
Gold	Sisulu, Nontsikelelo Albertina	2003
Gold	Sobukwe, Robert Mangaliso †	2003
Gold	Suzman, Helen	1997
Silver	Tamana, D. †	2003
Gold	Tiro, O.A. †	2003
Silver	Tshabalala-Msimang, Manto	2003
Gold	Tutu, Desmond Mpilo	1999
Silver	van der Merwe, S.S.	2003
Gold	Venter, William Peter	1991
Silver	Williams-de Bruyn, Sophia Theresa	2003
Gold	Smith, Margaret Mary	1987

Note: † denotes a posthumous award.
