= Star of South Africa, Silver =

- Type: Military decoration for merit
- Awarded for: Exceptionally meritorious service of major military significance
- Country: South Africa
- Presented by: the State President and, from 1994, the President
- Eligibility: General and flag officers
- Post-nominals: SSAS
- Status: Discontinued in 2002
- Established: 1975
- Ribbon bar

SADF pre-1994 & SANDF post-2002 orders of wear
- Next (higher): SADF precedence: Star of South Africa, Gold; SANDF precedence: Star of South Africa, Gold
- Equivalent: Star of South Africa, Grand Officer
- Next (lower): SADF succession: Star of South Africa (1952); SANDF succession: Order of the Leopard, Military Division, Commander

The Star of South Africa, Silver, post-nominal letters SSAS, was the second level decoration of two military and five non-military classes of the Order of the Star of South Africa, which was instituted by the Republic of South Africa on 1 July 1975. It was awarded to general and flag officers of the South African Defence Force for exceptionally meritorious service of major military significance. The Order of the Star of South Africa was discontinued in 2002.

== The South African military ==
The Union Defence Forces (UDF) were established in 1912 and renamed the South African Defence Force (SADF) in 1958. On 27 April 1994, it was integrated with six other independent forces into the South African National Defence Force (SANDF).

== Institution ==
The Star of South Africa, Silver, post-nominal letters SSAS, was instituted by the State President on 1 July 1975, as the junior decoration of two military classes of the Order of the Star of South Africa. The order was named after the first large diamond to be found in South Africa, the Star of South Africa, which was found on the banks of the Orange River in 1869 and which sparked the New Rush, leading to the establishment of Kimberley.

The Order of the Star of South Africa was expanded on 17 October 1978, when a non-military division, with decorations in five classes, was instituted for conferment on civilians and, from 1988, on senior police, prisons service and intelligence service officers, as well as foreign military attachés. The second of these five non-military decorations, the Star of South Africa, Grand Officer, ranks on par with the Star of South Africa, Silver.

== Award criteria ==
The Star of South Africa, Silver was awarded to general and flag officers for exceptionally meritorious service of major military significance.

== Order of wear ==
The position of the Star of South Africa, Silver in the official order of precedence was revised twice after 1975, to accommodate the inclusion or institution of new decorations and medals, upon the integration into the South African National Defence Force in 1994 and again with the institution of a new set of awards in 2003.

South African Defence Force until 26 April 1994

- Official SADF order of precedence:
  - Preceded by the Star of South Africa, Gold (SSA).
  - Succeeded by the Star of South Africa (1952) (SSA).
- Official national order of precedence:
  - Preceded by the Order of the Southern Cross, Silver (OSS).
  - Succeeded by the Order for Meritorious Service, Silver (OMSS).

South African National Defence Force from 27 April 1994

- Official SANDF order of precedence:
  - Preceded by the Star of South Africa, Gold (SSA) of the Republic of South Africa.
  - Succeeded by the Order of the Leopard, Military Division, Commander of the Republic of Bophuthatswana.
- Official national order of precedence:
  - Preceded by the Order of the Southern Cross, Silver (OSS) of the Republic of South Africa.
  - Succeeded by the Order of the Leopard, Grand Commander of the Republic of Bophuthatswana.

Breast star obverse

The position of the Star of South Africa, Silver in the order of precedence remained unchanged, as it was on 27 April 1994, when a new series of military orders, decorations and medals was instituted on 27 April 2003.

== Description ==
Breast star reverse

Obverse

The Star of South Africa, Silver was struck in silver and is a Maltese cross, with the arms in dark blue enamel, with protea flowers between the arms of the cross. Two four-pointed stars, superimposed on one another, are mounted on the cross.

Reverse

The reverse has the pre-2000 South African Coat of Arms.

Ribbon

The decoration is worn around the neck on a dark blue ribbon, 35 millimetres wide, with a 2 millimetres wide white band in the centre.

Breast star

Recipients also wear a silver breast star with eight multi-rayed points, which displays the obverse of the decoration in its centre. The reverse of the breast star has the pre-1994 South African Coat of Arms in the centre, with the silver hallmark below it.

== Discontinuation ==
Conferment of the decoration was discontinued on 6 December 2002, when a new set of national orders was instituted.
