= 24 Squadron SAAF =

24 Squadron
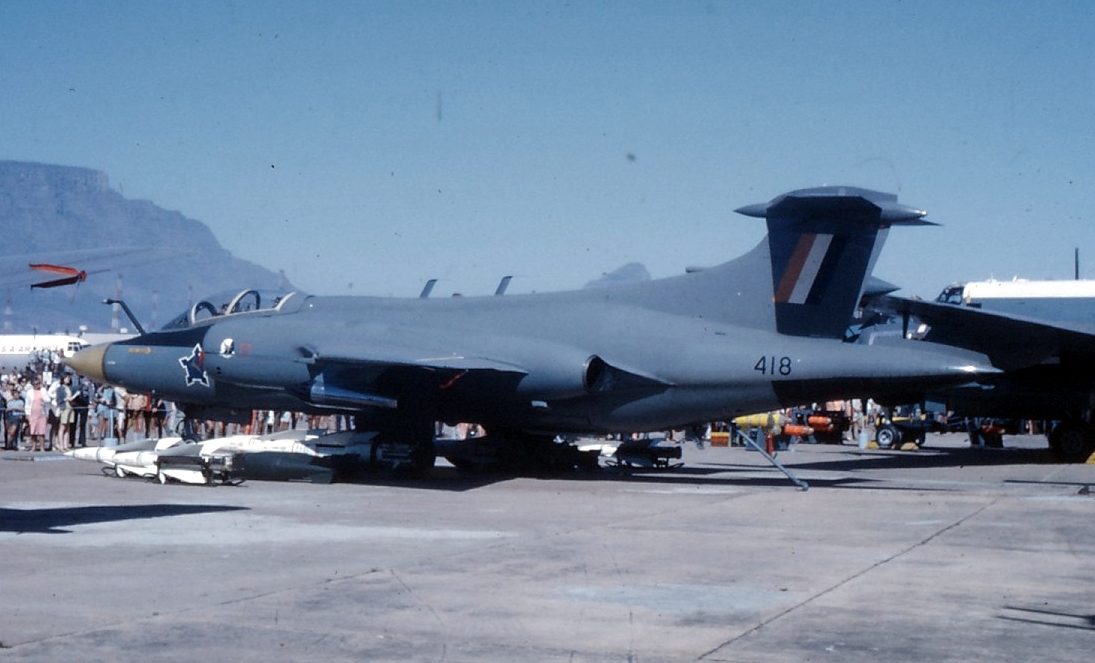
- Hawker Siddeley Buccaneer S.Mk 50 no. 418 of 24 Sqn
- Active: 5 March 1941 – 6 November 1945; 1 May 1965 – March 1991
- Country: (South Africa)
- Branch: South African Air Force
- Role: Bomber/Strike Squadron
- Garrison/HQ: AFB Waterkloof when disbanded.
- Mottos: Per Noctem Per Diem Through Night, Through Day

Insignia
- Squadron Identification Code: OZ 1942
- Squadron Crest

24 Squadron SAAF is a disbanded squadron of the South African Air Force. Its last role was as an attack aircraft squadron. The squadron was first formed during World War II on 5 March 1941 by renumbering 14 Squadron SAAF in Egypt. It later carried out bombing operations in Kenya and North Africa, before taking part in the Italian campaign and then disbanding in late 1945 at the conclusion of hostilities. The squadron was later re-raised and operated jet aircraft in an attack role during the Border War. It was finally disbanded in early 1991.

== History ==
On 5 March 1941, 24 Squadron SAAF was formed when No.14 Squadron SAAF and its Martin Maryland bombers were moved from Kenya to Egypt, and renumbered as No.24 Squadron. The squadron then operated alongside No. 39 Squadron RAF as a daytime tactical bomber unit carrying out bombing sorties against targets in the Mediterranean theatre. 24 Squadron was later in the year re-equipped with Douglas Bostons.

In December 1943, the squadron was relocated to Algeria and re-equipped with the Martin B-26 Marauders and in 1944 flew to a new base at Pescara, Italy, before later advancing to Jesi, Italy. At the end of the war the squadron used its Marauders as transport aircraft, before moving to Egypt in October 1945 and disbanding on 6 November 1945.

The Buccaneer entered SAAF service in 1965. SAAF Buccaneers saw active service during the Border War in South West Africa, notably at Cassinga in 1978. They flew over Angola and Namibia in the 1970s and 1980s, and attacked SWAPO guerrilla camps with rockets and bombs.

The squadron was disbanded in March 1991 at Air Force Base Waterkloof, Pretoria.

== Aircraft ==
Aircraft flown by 24 Squadron
Note: Aircraft type photographs may not necessarily represent aircraft of the same mark or actual aircraft belonging to the squadron.
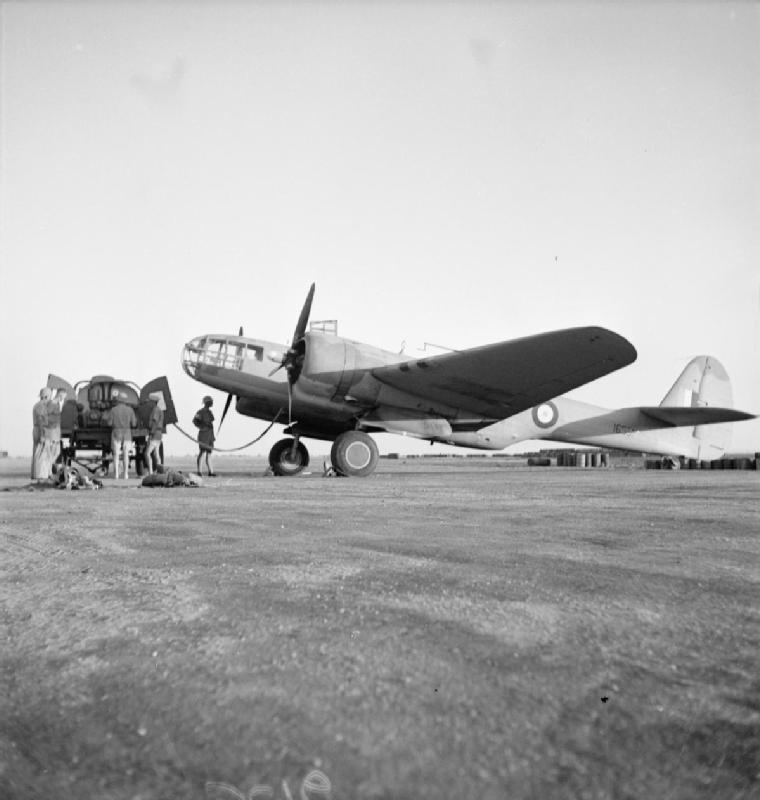
Martin Maryland Mark II
1941

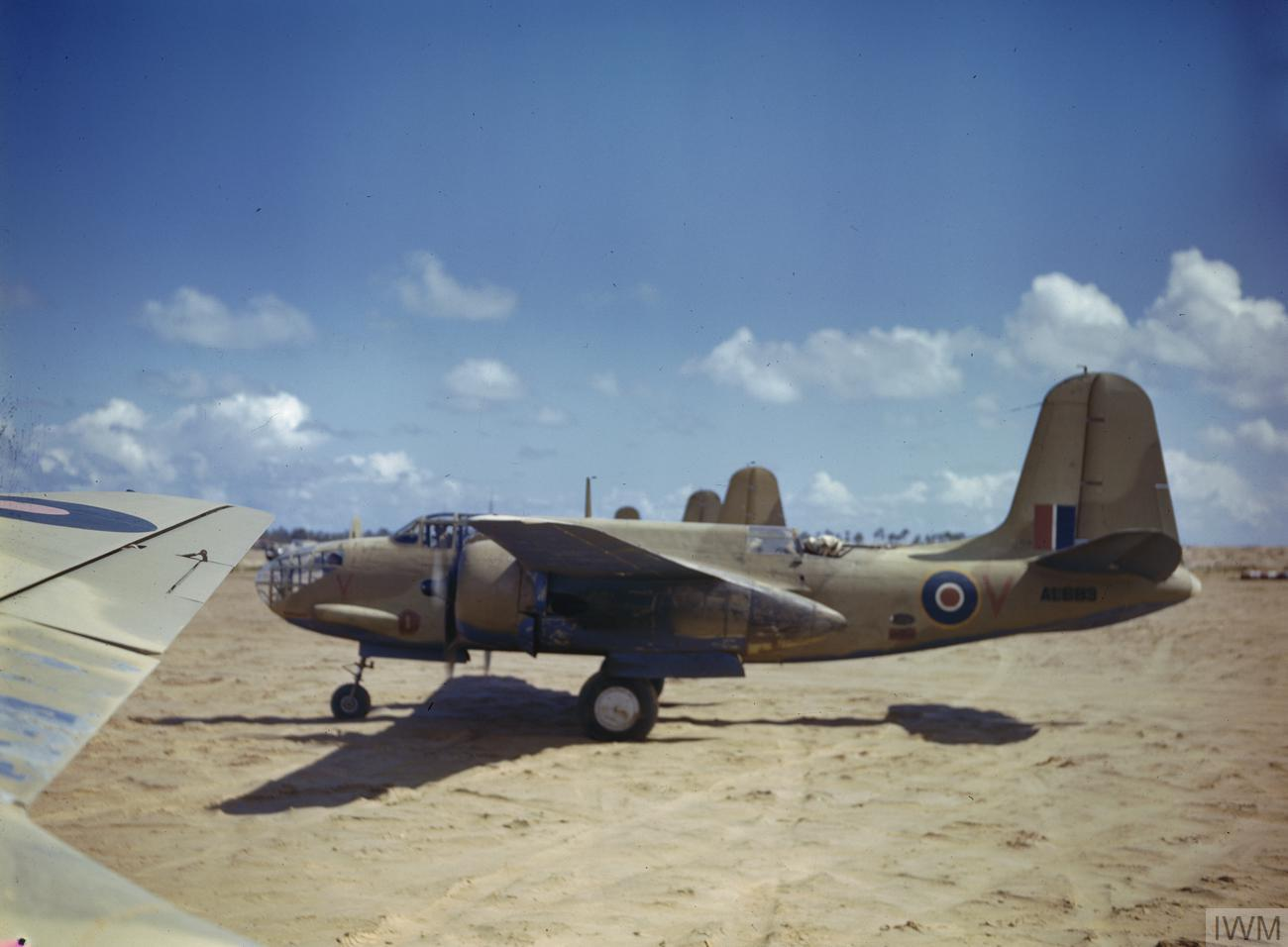
Boston Mk.III of 24 Sqn
1941

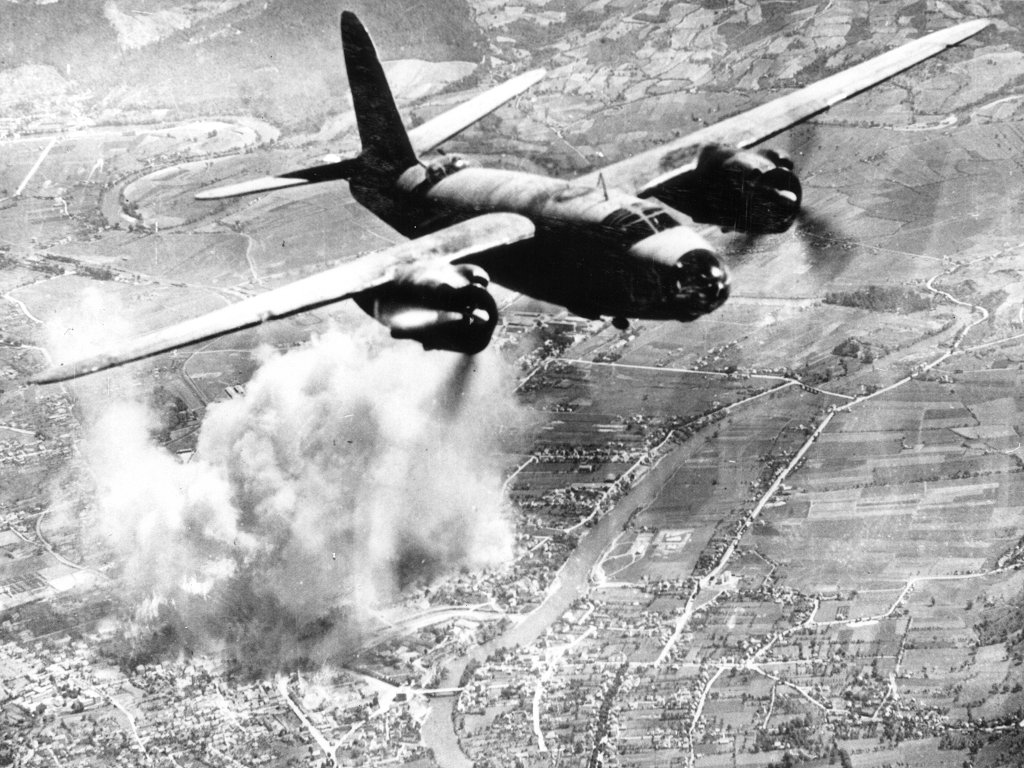
Marauder Mk II
1943

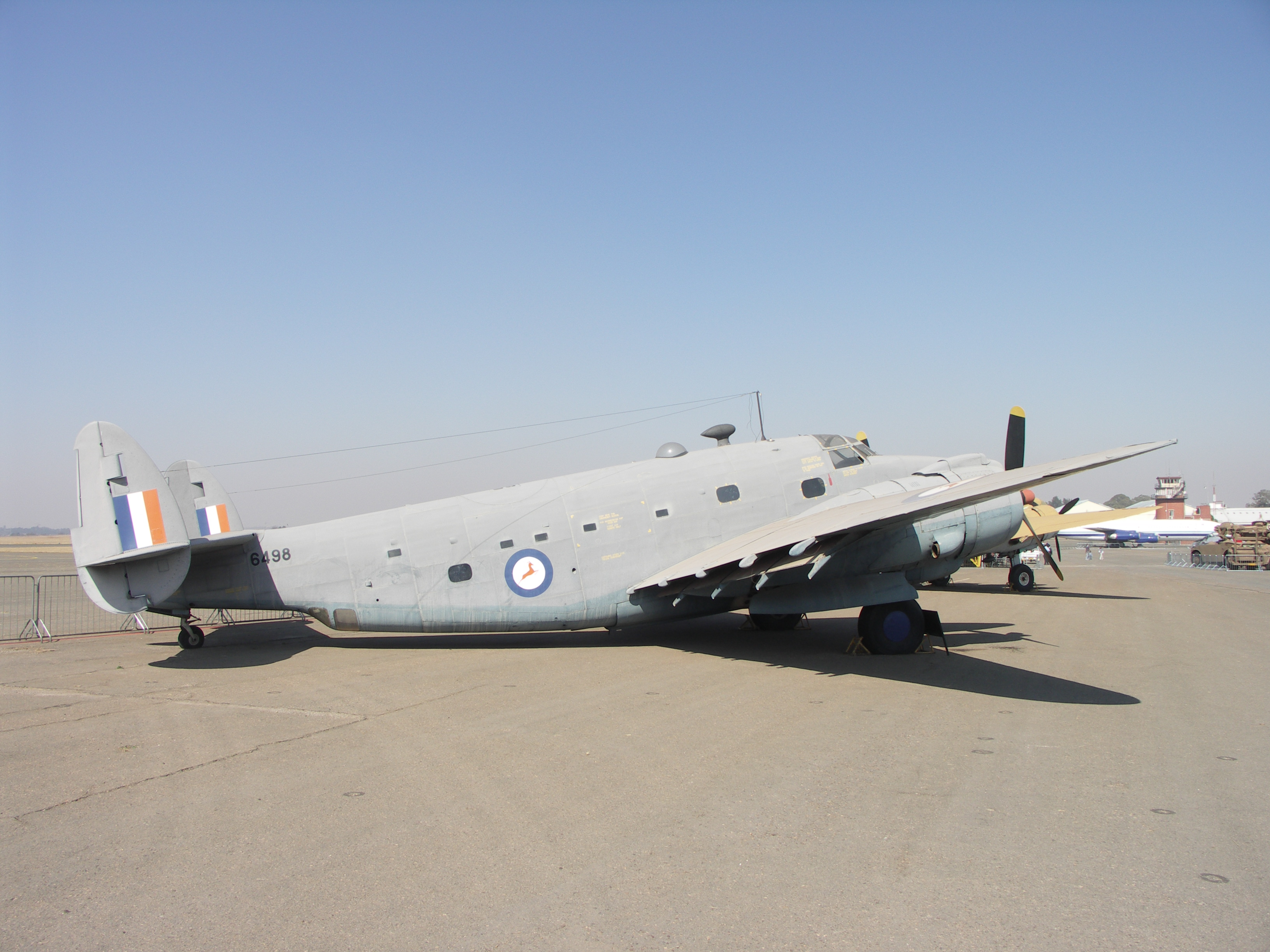
PV1 Ventura
1945

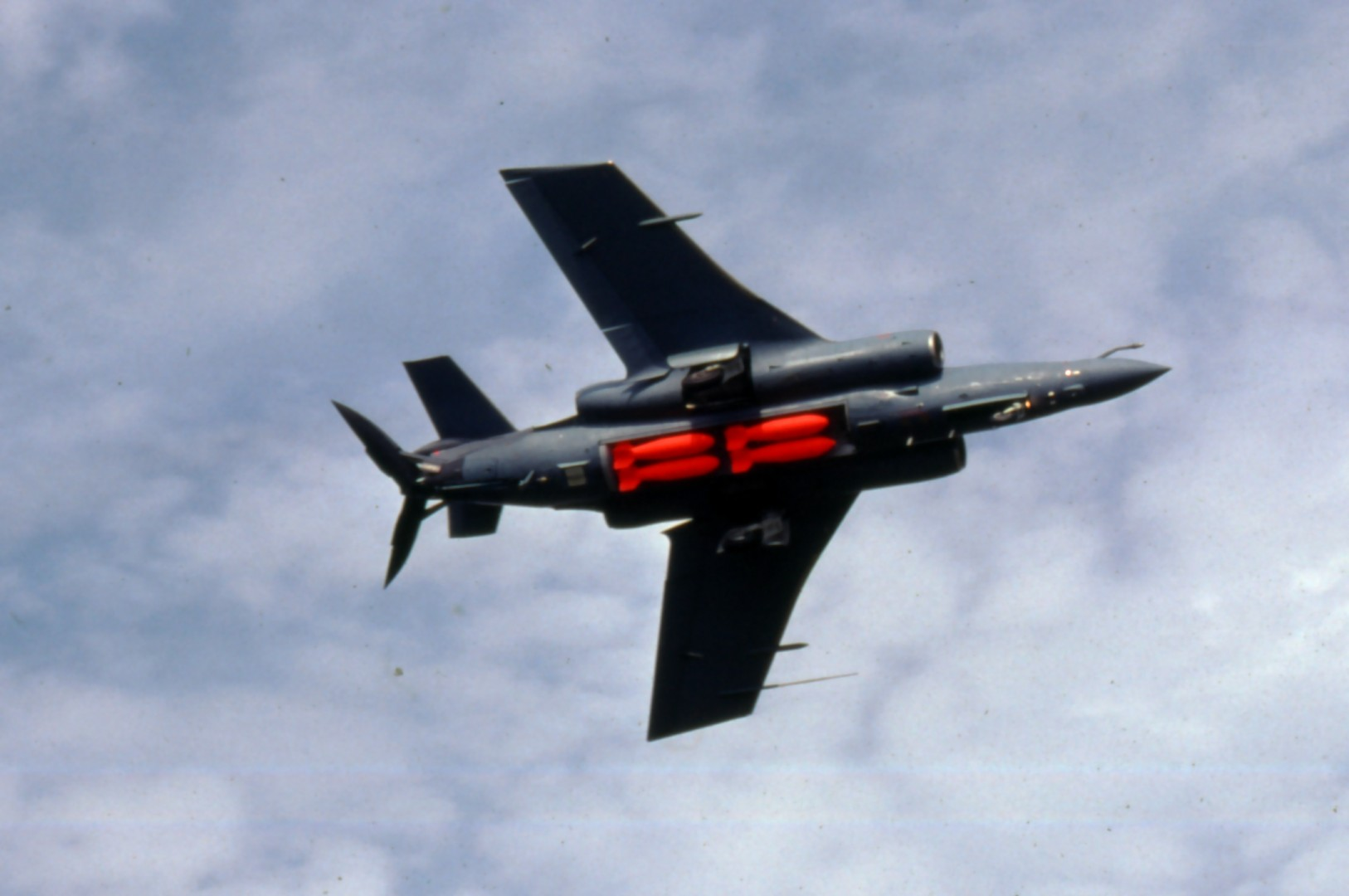
HS Buccaneer S.50
1965–1991
