= Chief of Staff Operations =

The Chief of Staff Operations is a senior post in the South African National Defence Force.

The Chief of Staff Operations liaises with multi-lateral organisation, international and domestic stakeholders and the spheres of government; establishes all necessary legal instruments related to the deployment of the force in terms of the Constitution, international law and the Defence Act; conducts high-level joint operational planning; and prepares directives on the conduct of operations.

They are also responsible for the philosophy, doctrine and configuration of the command and control system for the Defence Force, whilst Chief Staff Command and Communication Systems Management (CS6) establishes and maintains the communications system architecture for command and control.
