= Star of South Africa (diamond) =

Diamond

Star of South Africa Dudley Diamond
- Weight: 47.69 carats (9.538 g)
- Color: white
- Cut: pear
- Country of origin: Cape Colony
- Discovered: 1869
- Original owner: a Griqua shepherd, then Schalk van Niekerk

The Star of South Africa, also known as the Dudley Diamond, is a 47.69-carat (9.538 g) white diamond found by a Griqua shepherd in 1869 on the banks of the Orange River. The original stone, before cutting, weighed 83.5 carats (16.70 g). The finding of this large diamond led to diamond prospectors coming to the area, culminating in the July 1871 rush to the nearby new diamond field at Colesberg Koppje, soon known as New Rush, and later to be known as Kimberley.

The shepherd sold the stone for the price of 500 sheep, 10 oxen and a horse to Schalk van Niekerk, a neighbouring farmer locally famous for having acquired a 21-and-a-quarter carat diamond in 1866 after it was bought from a 15-year-old boy, Erasmus Jacobs.

Van Niekerk sold the stone on to the Lilienfield Brothers in Hopetown for £11,200 ( £1,363,334 in 2020 pounds). The Lilienfield Brothers sent it to England where it changed hands twice before finally being bought by the Countess of Dudley for £25,000. William Ward, the Earl of Dudley, had it mounted with 95 smaller diamonds in a head ornament.

The diamond stayed in the earl's estate until 2 May 1974 when it was sold on auction in Geneva for 1.6 million Swiss francs, equivalent to around £225,300 (equivalent to £2,136,020 in 2025), at the time.

It was last seen in public at the vault of the Natural History Museum London, 8 July 2005 – 26 February 2006. A reproduction of the uncut and cut diamond is still on show there.

The diamond may have inspired Jules Verne's 1884 novel The Southern Star.

The diamond was depicted as being stolen in the film Flawless.

== See also ==
- List of diamonds
