= List of foreign recipients of the National Order of Merit =

The National Order of Merit is a French order of merit with membership awarded by the President of the French Republic, founded 3 December 1963 by President Charles de Gaulle. The order was established to replace the number of ministerial orders previously awarded by numerous ministries, and to create an award for French citizens as well as foreign nationals for distinguished civil or military achievements, though of a lesser level than that required for the award of the Legion of Honour.

== Albania ==
Officier

- Beqir Ajazi (2002) Editor-in-chief of the "Atdheu" newspaper

Knight

- Ferit Hoxha
- Valter Gjoni (2002)

== Argentina ==
Officier

- Commodore Herberto J. Vicentini. (1987) Argentina Air Force

== Armenia ==
- Ara Babloyan, politician, pediatrician, President of the National Assembly of Armenia
- Narek Sargsyan, architect, Minister of Urban Development of Armenia, 1 February 2010
- Vigen Sargsyan, politician, Defence minister of Armenia

Mher Shahgeldyan politician

== Australia ==
Grand Officer

- Penelope Wensley, former Australian state governor

Commander

- General Angus Campbell, Chief of the Defence Force
- Vice Admiral Russ Crane, former Chief of Navy

Knight

- Tina Arena Singer-songwriter, recording artist, musical theatre actress, record producer.
- Commodore Timothy Brown Royal Australian Navy, Director General Submarines.
- Professor Katherine Daniell BEng(Civil)(Hons)/BA (Adel.), PhD (ANU/AgroParisTech, France), MIEAust, Australian National University.
- Chris Perrin Australian Naval Veteran. Investiture 25 April 2014
- Serge Thomann, Councillor and Deputy Mayor of the City of Port Phillip (2008–2016), entrepreneur, photographer. Investiture 7 March 2019 at Raheen by French Ambassador Mr Christophe Penot.

== Austria ==
- Felix Ermacora Austrian politician and human rights expert.
- Sabine Herlitschka CEO of Infineon Technologies Austria
- Andreas Maislinger, Founder of the Austrian Holocaust Memorial Service (Gedenkdienst).
- Christian H. Schierer, Austrian Trade Commissioner and Commercial Counsellor at the Austrian Embassy

== Bangladesh ==
Knight

- AHM Mostafizur Rahman researcher in crop production, climate change and food security.

== Belgium ==
Officer

- Prof. Bruno Bernard (2007)
- Xibe Lambrechts, martial artist (2022)

== Bosnia and Herzegovina ==
- Asim Behaderović criminologist and police officer

== Brazil ==
- Prof. Nelson Maculan Filho, D.H.R., Brazilian scientist

== Canada ==
Grand Officer

- Roméo LeBlanc Former Governor General.

Officier

- Vice-Admiral Maurice Frank Ronald "Ron Lloyd" CMM CD Commander of the Royal Canadian Navy (Officer level of this medal) Awarded on 4 November 2017

Chevalier/Knight

- Marlène Harnois Olympic medalist.
- David R. Low (awarded in 1988) former Chairman of the Interdepartmental Committee on Space, Vice President of Spar Aerospace and inaugural General Manager of Radarsat International. Former Assistant Secretary to Cabinet in the Privy Council Office and Deputy Secretary in the Ministry of State for Science and Technology.
- Douglas T. Wright (1993) Engineer and civil servant. President, and Vice-Chancellor of the University of Waterloo, 1981 to 1993. Fellow of the Canadian Academy of Engineering and of the Engineering Institute of Canada. Recipient of the Gold Medal of the Canadian Council of Professional Engineers and a founding member of the Prime Minister's National Advisory Board on Science and Technology.

== Czech Republic ==
- Jaroslav Šedivý
- Michaela Šojdrová (2009)
- Meda Mládková (2016)

Commander

- Petr Pavel
- Karel Řehka

== Denmark ==
Grand Cross

- King Frederik X of Denmark
- Queen Mary of Denmark

== Dominican Republic ==
Chevalier/Knight

- Ana Rosa Amalia Berges Dreyfous (2009) Juris Doctor, university professor and judge of the Supreme Court of the Dominican Republic

== Finland ==
Grand Cross

- Mauno Koivisto (25 November 1980)
- Jenni Haukio
- Paavo Lipponen
- Richard Seppälä
- Paavo Väyrynen

== France ==
Knight

- Arthur Mensch (2025) entrepreneur, CEO and co-founder of Mistral AI

== Germany ==
Commander

- Generalleutnant Franz Pöschl (11 April 1979), Commanding General of the Bundeswehr III.Korps, recipient of the Knights Cross of the Iron Cross during the Second World War.

== Haiti ==
- Gary Victor (2001) award-winning writer, playwright

== Hong Kong ==
- T. K. Ann, industrialist, legislator and sinologist

== Iceland ==
Chevalier/Knight

- Einar Hermannsson (2017)
- Ágúst Válfells (father, born in 1934) (1965)

== India ==
Chevalier/Knight

- Narinder Kumar Mehra (2003)
- Rajiv Singhal (2014)
- Ilika Mann (2014)
- Satyajit Mayor (2019)
- Bharat Salhotra (2015)
- Sivaji Ganesan
- Biren Ghose (2021)
- Ruchira Gupta (2017)
- Aditya Ghosh (2023)
- Aditya Surpal (2023)

Officier

- Villoo Morawala-Patell (2008)

== Indonesia ==
Grand Cross

- Siti Hartinah, First Lady of Indonesia
- Lieutenant General Sudharmono, Vice President of Indonesia
- General Achmad Tahir, Ambassador of the Republic of Indonesia to France
- Prof Emil Salim, Minister of the Environment of Indonesia
- General Umar Wirahadikusumah, Vice President of Indonesia
- Adam Malik, Indonesia Minister of Foreign Affairs (1972)

Grand Officer

- General Poniman, Chief of Staff of the Indonesian Army
- General Rudini, Chief of Staff of the Indonesian Army (1987)
- Muhammad Noer, Ambassador of the Republic of Indonesia to France
- Lieutenant General Dading Kalbuadi, Chief of the General Staff of the Indonesian Army

Commander

- Ginandjar Kartasasmita, Speaker of Regional Representative Council of Indonesia (1987)
- Lieutenant General Prabowo Subianto, Commander of Army Strategic Reserve Command of Indonesia (1997)
- General Tyasno Sudarto, Chief of Staff of the Indonesian Army (1997)
- Vice Admiral Amarulla Octavian, Rector of the Republic of Indonesia Defense University (2022)
- General Andika Perkasa, Commander of the Indonesian National Armed Forces (2022)
- Air Chief Marshal Hadi Tjahjanto, Minister of Agrarian Affairs and Spatial Planning of Indonesia (2022)
- Air Chief Marshal Fadjar Prasetyo, Chief of Staff of the Indonesian Air Force (2023)
- Lieutenant General Muhammad Ismail, Governor of Central Java
- R. Soeprapto, Governor of Jakarta (1987)

Officer

- Prof. Sujudi, Rector of the University of Indonesia (1989)

== Iran ==
Grand Cross

- Safi Asfia, engineer and statesman

== Ireland ==
- Brigadier General Barney McMahon, Irish Air Corps officer, for his work in promoting Franco-Irish co-operation in military aviation.

Chevalier

- Professor Kathleen O'Flaherty (1972), academic, writer and Professor of French at University College Cork

== Italy ==
Commander

- Maestro Goffredo Petrassi, Italian Composer and Conductor. Awarded on 12 December 1980 (awarded with Commander grade of this medal)

== Jamaica ==
Chevalier

- Paulette Ramsay, Author, Researcher and Professor at the University of the West Indies, Mona Campus.

== Japan ==
- Empress Michiko of Japan

Chevalier/Knight

- Mari Miura
- Mizuho Fukushima
- Tomoko M. Nakanishi
- Yojiro Terada

== Kenya ==
Commander

- Dr.Njoroge Mungai Kenya Foreign Affairs Minister and Businessman

== Kosovo ==
Officer

- Valon Murtezaj Professor in Paris and a Kosovan politician

== Lebanon ==
Officier

- General Ziad Haykal
- Adnan Kassar
- General Maroun Hitti
- General shamel roukoz

Chevalier/Knight

- Professor Sanaa Sabbah
- Nada Sardouk
- Nora Joumblatt

== Malaysia ==
Chevalier / Knight

- Alvin Michael Hew (2004) - L'Oreal Managing Director Malaysia & Taiwan - awarded by President Jacques Chirac
- SM Nasarudin SM Nasimuddin - NAZA bizman.
- Jamaliyah Ambia (1996) - She served as the Head of French bank, La Societe Generale for 15 years in Malaysia (1983–1998), was President of l'Alliance Française de Kuala Lumpur (AFKL) for 10 years (1996–2006), member, treasurer and Deputy President of AFKL since 1978, former president of non profit NGO Soroptimist Malaysia, together with Tunku Dato' Seri Utama Naquiyuddin they both were founding members of MAFRETA (Malaysia-France Economic & Trade Association) and was Director of Marketing at Airbus Group Malaysia for 14 years (2003–2017). Currently works as a consultant for various French defence companies in Malaysia and Singapore. She was awarded the Chevalier medal by Jacques Chirac in 1996 for promoting trade, investment and culture between France and Malaysia.

Commander

- Ambassador Mohamed bin Haron
- Airasia CEO Tony Fernandes

Officier

- Datin Chan-Low Kam Yoke (2005), Group CEO, HELP University appointed by President Jacques Chirac for her contribution to the development of educational and cultural collaboration between France and Malaysia
- Md Zabid Abdul Rashid, Vice Chancellor and President Universiti Tun Abdul Razak (Malaysia)

== Mexico ==
Grand Officier

- Lic. Víctor Manuel Villaseñor (1970), Mexican politician and industrialist. He manufactured Renault automobiles in Mexico from 1960 to 1970.

Officier

- Mr. Ángel Barraza y del Toro (1975) Commercial attaché to the Mexican embassy in France from 1974 to 1975.

== New Zealand ==
Officier

- Professor Keith Val Sinclair, New Zealand born academic and Professor of French at the James Cook University of North Queensland.

Chevalier

- Mr Reece Discombe (1966), New Zealand engineer and diver for re-locating Comte de la Perouse's two lost vessels in 1962. He was awarded by President Charles de Gaulle in 1966.
- Mr Dermot Neill (1979).
- Mr Robert Kingscote (1982).
- Mr Lloyd Upton (1997).
- Ms Beverley Randell Price (2005), in recognition of her role in the development of relations and friendship between New Zealand and France by offering Randell Cottage as a writer's residence.
- Professor Emerita Jocelyn Harris (2006), French Honorary Consul to Dunedin.
- Ms Martine Marshall-Durieux (2008), High School French teacher and President of the Alliances Francaises of Christchurch.
- Ms Frances James (2010), French teacher and journalist in recognition of work to present a positive image of France and awaken people's interest and love for that country.
- Ms Judith Trotter CMNZ (2010), New Zealand's Ambassador to France from 1987 to 1992, and chair of the France-New Zealand Friendship Fund from 2002 to 2008.
- Ms Marie Brown (2010), teacher of French and French literature from 1977 and especially president of the Alliances Francaises of Wellington from 2002 to 2004.
- Mrs Stephanie Richards (2011), for contributions to the strengthening of ties between France and New Zealand, especially during her time as the head of Thales NZ.

== Netherlands ==
- King Willem-Alexander of the Netherlands.
- Queen Máxima of the Netherlands
- Caroline van Eck

== Niger ==
- Mariama Hima, ambassador of Niger in France between 1996 and 2003

== North Macedonia ==
Commander

- Radmila Šekerinska

== Norway ==
- Queen Sonja of Norway.
- Jon Fosse

== Pakistan ==
- Riaz Piracha, foreign secretary
- Major General Rehmat Khan
- Commodore Suhail Hameed SI(M)
- Lt. Col. Omar Jalal Qureshi (Deflog Pvt Ltd.)
- Shabir Ahmed, CEO of DL Nash (Pvt) Ltd
- Marvi Memon, politician
- Dr. Asad Asghar Ali, Regional Director GEC Alstom, Pakistan.

== Palestine ==
Knight

- Dr. Amal Daraghmeh Masri, businesswoman, founder and editor-in-chief of Middle East Business magazine and news, founding member of 'Palestine Accueil', President of Palestine-France Business Council. Awarded Feb 2017.

== Paraguay ==
Officer

Concepción Leyes de Chaves

== Portugal ==
Chevalier

- Rogerio Walter Carreira, Directeur ALSTOM au Mozambique
- António Rendas, medical researcher and academic

== Romania ==
Chevalier

- Ionela Băluță
- Radu Mircea Berceanu

Commander

- Nicolae Ciucă

== Samoa ==
Officier

- Vaimasenu'u Zita Sefo-Martel Honorary Consul of France, Business and Sports Woman
- Norman Paul Former Honorary Consul of France and Businessman

== Saudi Arabia ==
Grand Officier

- Sultan bin Abdulaziz Al Saud

== Senegal ==
- Léopold Sédar Senghor Poet, politician, and cultural theorist.

== Serbia ==
Grand Officer

- Radomir Diklić, Diplomat.

Commander

- Pavle Janković, Diplomat.

Officer

- Ivan Vejvoda, Social scientist.
- Colonel Slavoljub Dabić, Former military attache in Paris.

Knight

- Predrag Marić, Civil servant.
- Colonel Vojislav Krstović, Military officer.
- Nataša Vučković, Parliamentarian.
- Dubravka Stojanović, Historian.
- Saša Janković, National Ombudsman
- Tanja Miščević, Head of the Negotianting Team for the Accession of Serbia to the European Union.
- Colonel Zoran Rašeta, Former military attache in Paris.
- Stanislav Sretenović, Historian.
- Gordana Janićijević, Deputy Public Prosecutor of Serbia.
- Nataša Kovačević-Stojaković, former basketball player
- Mirolslava Maksimović, Former employee of French Embassy in Serbia.
- Vukosava Crnjanski, Founder and Director of CRTA.

== Singapore ==
Officer

- Major-General Kelvin Khong, Singapore Armed Forces, Chief of Air Force (Singapore)
- Rear Admiral Aaron Beng, Singapore Armed Forces, Chief of Navy (Singapore)

== South Africa ==
- Carolyn Steyn, philanthropist and founder of 67 Blankets for Nelson Mandela Day.
- Princess Dr Tebogo Modjadji-Kekana (Global Philanthropist and Global Chairperson for Gender Equality)
- David Kramer, educator
- Rear Admiral Paul Alexander Wijnberg
- Lieutenant General Maomela Moreti Motau(Conflict resolution in the Congo)

== Spain ==
- Juan Carlos I of Spain.
- Queen Sofía of Spain
- Queen Letizia of Spain

== Sweden ==
- Eva Nordmark, President of TCO, the Swedish Confederation of Professional Employees.
- Fredrik Ljungström, engineer, inventor
- Henrik Ekstrand
- Karl Engelbrektson, General, Swedish Armed Forces.
- Queen Silvia of Sweden
- Victoria, Crown Princess of Sweden

== Switzerland ==
- Yvette Jaggi, member of the National Council, the Council of States, and Mayor of Lausanne

== Taiwan ==
- Yu Mei-nu, legislator, human rights lawyer

== Thailand ==
- Princess Galyani Vadhana, the Princess of Naradhiwas.
- Suthida Bajrasudha Bimalalakshana, the Queen of Thailand.

== Tunisia ==
=== Chevalier / Knight ===
- Saïd Bouziri (1947–2009), human rights and immigrant rights activist whose activism helped shape French immigration policy in the late 20th century

== Ukraine ==
- Ihor Voronchenko, Ukrainian Vice Admiral and commander of the Ukrainian Navy.
- Oksana Markarova, Ukrainian economist and former Minister of Finance of Ukraine.

== United Arab Emirates ==
- Jamal Sanad Al-Suwaidi, Director-general of the Emirates Center for Strategic Studies and Research.

Mohamed Jameel Al Ramahi, CEO of Masdar.

== United Kingdom ==
- Andrew P. Hibbert Lawyer.
- John Barbirolli Conductor and cellist.
- John McManners Clergyman and historian of religion.
- Sir John Chalstrey Surgeon and former Lord Mayor of London
- Capt. John Colin Rye, R.A. M.D. of Compagnie Française de l'Afrique Occidentale, U.K. Branch.
- Ann Kenrick Secretary-General, Franco-British Council
- Ian Reed, Director, Allied Air Forces Memorial, Elvington, York.
- Camilla, Duchess of Cornwall (later Queen Camilla)
- John Rees, Welsh Development Agency
- Martin John McCarthy, Former Director General of Total S.A.
- Catherine, Princess of Wales

== United States ==
- Virginie Askinazi, MBA, International School of Broward Board Liaison, received in 2013.
- Thomas A. Benes, Major General, USMC, received 26 January 2007
- William Bergman, US Army LtColonel, diplomat, scholar.
- David Black, executive director, French Institute Alliance Française, 1998
- Katharine Branning, librarian, author and historian.
- Chris Braun, adVINture, USA
- Enrique Cadenas, scholar at the University of Southern California.
- Wesley Clark, US Army General
- Philip Hart Cullom, VADM, USN
- Dan Daniel (1914–1988), American politician and 39th National Commander of the American Legion
- Kelvin Davies, scholar at the University of Southern California.
- James G. Foggo III, USN
- Bruce Jackson, US scholar
- James L. Jones, USMC General
- Dave Karno, Journalist and War Correspondent, 1968
- Robert J. Kelly, Admiral and Commander in Chief of the United States Pacific Fleet, 28 January 1993
- Thomas E. Kennedy, US Dept of Defense, 15 March 1991
- Brian L. Losey, Rear Admiral, USN, received 9 December 2016
- Martha Carolyn Matheny, The World Bank and IMF, received 7 July 2014
- Theodor Meron, President of the International Criminal Tribunal for the former Yugoslavia, President of the Mechanism for International Criminal Tribunals, Scholar, Judge
- Mark A. Milley, USA
- T. Michael Moseley, USAF
- Helen Coley Nauts, Cancer Research Institute (CRI), 1981
- Robert Neller, USMC
- Dennis E. Petito, Honorary Chair, French American Chamber of Commerce Texas, 2022
- John W. Raymond, USAF
- Stewart Addington Saint-David, Marquis of Saint-Jean-Baptiste, university professor and author; received 30 June 2004
- Steven M. Shepro, USAF
- Sumner Shapiro, RADM, USN
- Anthony Zinni, USMC General
- James R Allen, (1925–1992) Air Force General

== Uruguay ==
- Hugo Batalla, Vice president of Uruguay
- Maria Lorente, Journalist AFP

== Yugoslavia ==
- Marshal Josip Broz Tito
- Jovanka Broz
- Asllan Fazlija

== Vietnam ==
Officier

- Trần Thanh Vân (2002) – Particle physicist and founder of "Rencontres du Vietnam."
- Lê Kim Ngọc (2002) – Biologist and plant physiologist.
- Nguyễn Thị Bích Huệ (2021) – Former Ambassador of Vietnam to Italy and Minister Counselor in France.
- Nguyễn Thị Ngọc Dung (2021) – Former Rector of Pham Ngoc Thach University of Medicine and President of the Vietnam-France Friendship Association.

Chevalier/Knight

- Phan Huy Lê (2002) – Historian and former President of the Vietnam Association of History Science.
- Nguyễn Vũ Quốc Huy (2024) – Rector of Hue University of Medicine and Pharmacy.
- Phạm Tuấn Long (2024) – Chairman of the Hoan Kiem District People's Committee.
- Bùi Thành Nhơn (2021) – Chairman of NovaGroup.
- Nguyễn Thành Nam (2022) – Digital education pioneer and co-founder of FPT Group.
- Lương Ngọc Khuê (2022) – Director of the Department of Medical Examination and Treatment (Ministry of Health).
- Nguyễn Quang Thuấn (2017) – Former President of the Vietnam Academy of Social Sciences (VASS).
- Trần Văn Nam (2017) – Former Rector of the University of Da Nang.
- Nguyễn Hồng Sơn (2024) – Director of the Vietnam Academy of Agricultural Sciences (VAAS).
- Hom Nguyen (2021) – French-Vietnamese contemporary artist.
