= Josef Roman Lorenz =

Austrian naturalist (1825–1911)

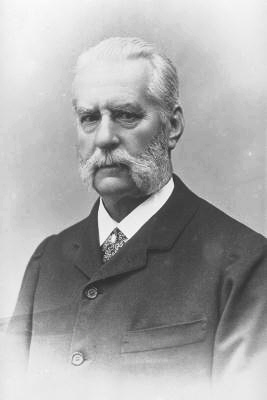
Josef Roman Lorenz (1825-1911)

Josef Roman Lorenz, later ennobled as Josef Roman Lorenz Ritter von Liburnau (26 November 1825, Linz – 13 November 1911, Vienna), was an Austrian naturalist. He is known for his studies in the fields of meteorology, phytogeography and agricultural sciences. He was the father of zoologist Ludwig Lorenz von Liburnau (1856–1943).

He studied at the University of Vienna, later working as a Mittelschulprofessor (middle school professor) in Salzburg und Fiume. From 1861 he served as a ministry official in Vienna. In 1872 he was co-founder of the School of Agricultural Sciences in Vienna, and from 1878 to 1899 was president of the Austrian Meteorological Society.

== Writings ==
- Allgemeine Resultate aus den pflanzengeographischen und genetischen Untersuchungen der Moore im präalpinen Hügellande Salzburgs, 1858 - General results from the phytogeographical and genetic studies of pre-alpine bogs in the hill country of Salzburg.
- Physikalische verhältnisse und vertheilung der organismen im Quarnerischen golfe, 1863 - Physical relationships and distribution of organisms in the Gulf of Quarnero.
- Die Bodenkultur Österreichs, 1873 - Natural resources of Austria.
- Lehrbuch der Klimatologie für Land- und Forstwirthe, 1874 - Textbook of climatology for agriculture and forestry.
- Über Bedeutung und Vertretung der land- und forstwirthschaftlichen Meteorologie, 1877 - Meaning and representation of agricultural and forest meteorology.
- Wald, Klima und Wasser, 1878 - Forest, climate and water.
