= List of awards and nominations received by Tina Arena =

Tina Arena is an Australian singer-songwriter, musician, musical theatre actress and record producer. Tina Arena appeared as a child performer on the national television talent show Young Talent Time in 1976, at age 8 before branching out into a successful solo career.

== Awards and nominations ==
=== ALMA Awards ===
The ALMA Awards, (formerly known as Latin Oscars Award), is an award highlighting the best American Latino contributions to music, television, and film. The awards promote fair and accurate portrayals of Latinos. In Spanish and Portuguese the word alma means "soul."

Year	Nominee / work	Award	Result	Ref.
1999	"I Want to Spend My Life Time Loving You" (with Marc Antony)	Outstanding Performance of a Song for a Feature Film	Won	
1999	"I Want to Spend My Life Time Loving You" (with Marc Antony)	Outstanding Music Video	Nominated	

=== APRA Awards ===
The APRA Awards are held in Australia and New Zealand by the Australasian Performing Right Association to recognise songwriting skills, sales and airplay performance by its members annually.

Year	Nominee / work	Award	Result	Ref.
1996	"Wasn't It Good" (Tina Arena, Robert Parde, Heather Field)	Song of the Year	Won	
1996	"Wasn't It Good" (Tina Arena, Robert Parde, Heather Field)	Most Performed Song of the Year	Nominated	
1999	"Now I Can Dance" (Tina Arena, David Tyson)	Most Performed Song of the Year	Nominated	

=== ARIA Music Awards ===
The ARIA Music Awards is an annual awards ceremony that recognises excellence, innovation, and achievement across all genres of Australian music. They commenced in 1987.

Year	Nominee / work	Award	Result	Ref.
1991	Doug Brady for "Strong as Steel", "I Need Your Body", "The Machine's Breaking Down"	Engineer of the Year	Nominated	
1995	Don't Ask	Best Female Artist	Won	
1995	Don't Ask	Album of the Year	Won	
1995	Don't Ask	Highest Selling Album	Nominated	
1995	"Chains"	Best Pop Release	Won	
1995	"Chains"	Song of the Year	Won	
1995	"Chains"	Single of the Year	Nominated	
1996	Don't Ask	Highest Selling Album	Won	
1996	"Wasn't It Good"	Single of the Year	Nominated	
1996	"Wasn't It Good"	Best Female Artist	Nominated	
1996	"Wasn't It Good"	Best Pop Release	Nominated	
1996	"Wasn't It Good"	Song of the Year	Nominated	
1998	In Deep	Highest Selling Album	Nominated	
1998	In Deep	Best Female Artist	Nominated	
1998	"Burn"	Highest Selling Single	Nominated	
2000	Tina Arena	Outstanding Achievement Award	awarded	
2008	Songs of Love and Lose	Highest Selling Album	Nominated	
2013	Symphony of Life	Best Original Soundtrack, Cast or Show Album	Nominated	
2014	Reset	Best Adult Contemporary Album	Nominated	
2015	Tina Arena	ARIA Hall of Fame	inducted	
2016	Eleven	Best Adult Contemporary Album	Nominated	
2017	Tim White for Client Liaison (featuring Tina Arena) - "A Foreign Affair"	Best Video	Nominated	
2023	Love Saves	Best Adult Contemporary Album	Nominated	

=== Brit Awards ===
The BRIT Awards (often simply called the BRITs) are the British Phonographic Industry's annual popular music awards.

Year	Nominee / work	Award	Result	Ref.
1996	Tina Arena	International Breakthrough Act	Nominated	

=== Helpmann Awards ===
The Helpmann Awards is an awards show, celebrating live entertainment and performing arts in Australia, presented by industry group Live Live Performance Australia (LPA) since 2001.

Year	Nominee / work	Award	Result	Ref.
2008	Tina Arena	Best Performance in an Australian Contemporary Concert	Nominated	
2015	Reset Tour	Best Australian Contemporary Concert	Nominated	
2019	Tina Arena in Evita	Best Female Actor in a Musical	Nominated	

=== J Awards ===
The J Awards are an annual series of Australian music awards that were established by the Australian Broadcasting Corporation's youth-focused radio station Triple J. They commenced in 2005.

Year	Nominee / work	Award	Result	Ref.
2017	"A Foreign Affair" (Client Liaison with Tina Arena)	Australian Video of the Year	Won	

=== La Chanson de l'année ===
La Chanson de l'année (translated as "Song of the Year" in English) is a ceremony of awards which takes place every year in France.

Year	Nominee / work	Award	Result	Ref.
2006	"Aimer Jusqu'a L'impossible"	Song of the Year	Won	

=== Mo Awards ===
The Australian Entertainment Mo Awards (commonly known informally as the Mo Awards), were annual Australian entertainment industry awards. They recognise achievements in live entertainment in Australia from 1975 to 2016. Tina Arena won two awards in that time.

Year	Nominee / work	Award	Result (wins only)	Ref.
1995	Tina Arena	Rock Performer of the Year	Won	
1995	Tina Arena	Australian Performer of the Year	Won	

=== NRJ Music Award ===
The NRJ Music Award (commonly abbreviated as an NMA) is an award presented by the French radio station NRJ to honor the best in the French and worldwide music industry. They commenced in 2000.

Year	Nominee / work	Award	Result (wins only)	Ref.
2000	Tina Arena	International Breakthrough of the Year	Won	

=== Order of Australia ===
The Order of Australia is an honour that recognises Australian citizens and other persons for outstanding achievement and service.

Year	Nominee / work	Award	Result	Ref.
2016	Tina Arena	Member of the Order of Australia (AM)	awarded	

=== Ordre national du Mérite ===
The Ordre national du Mérite is a French order of merit with membership awarded by the President of the French Republic, founded on 3 December 1963 by President Charles de Gaulle.

Year	Nominee / work	Award	Result	Ref.
2009	Tina Arena	Knight	awarded	

=== People's Choice Awards ===
The People's Choice Awards (Australia) was an Australian version of the American awards show of the same name. It ran in 1998 and 1999. The awards recognised works of popular culture and people active in it. Winners were chosen by popular vote.

Year	Nominee / work	Award	Result	Ref.
1998	Tina Arena	Favourite Australian Singer (female)	Nominated	

=== Rolling Stone Australia Awards ===
The Rolling Stone Australia Awards are awarded annually in January or February by the Australian edition of Rolling Stone magazine for outstanding contributions to popular culture in the previous year.

Year	Nominee / work	Award	Result	Ref.
2023	Tina Arena	Rolling Stone Icon Award	awarded	

=== Support Act ===
Year	Nominee / work	Award	Result	Ref.
2019	Tina Arena	Excellence in Community Award	awarded	

=== World Music Awards ===
The World Music Awards was an international award show founded in 1989 under the patronage of Albert II, Prince of Monaco and co-founder/executive producer John Martinotti. The event is based in Monte Carlo. It ran from 1989 to 2008, 2010 and 2014.

Year	Nominee / work	Award	Result (wins only)	Ref.
1996	Tina Arena	World's Best Selling Australian Artist	Won	
2000	Tina Arena	World's Best Selling Australian Artist	Won	
