= Luz Argentina Chiriboga =

Afro-Ecuadorian writer

- Born: Luz Argentina Chiriboga Guerrero; April 1, 1940 (age 85); Esmeraldas, Ecuador
- Occupation: writer
- Years active: 1968–present
- Known for: Afro-Hispanic cultural identity and themes about women's challenges

Luz Argentina Chiriboga is an Afro-Ecuadorian writer who was one of the first writers to address the duality African and Hispanic cultures. In her poetry and novels, she writes about women in ways that challenge preconceived stereotypes. Her short story "El Cristo de la mirada baja" won first prize in 1986 in the International Literary Contest of the Liberator General San Martín held in Buenos Aires.

== Early life ==
Luz Argentina Chiriboga Guerrero was born on 1 April 1940 in Esmeraldas, Ecuador to the banana farmer Segundo Chiriboga Ramírez and Luz Maria Guerrero Morales. She attended the public school Hispanoamericana until the fourth grade and then transferred to the Colegio Nacional Cinco de Agosto in Esmeraldas, where she studied until 1955. Chiriboga then completed her high school education at the Colegio Nacional 24 de Mayo in Quito and went on to further her education from the Central University of Ecuador, earning a bachelor's degree in biological sciences with a specialty in ecology. In 1962, she married the writer Nelson Estupiñán Bass and they left Quito, returning to Esmeraldas, where she spent the next several years raising children and researching for her husband's work.

== Career ==
In 1968, Chiriboga began writing, inspired by a circus that had come to town. She showed her story to her husband, who encouraged her to continue. Over the next several years, she wrote several poems and dramatic pieces, publishing in periodicals like Débora, Letras del Ecuador and Revisa Cultura. In 1976, she was elected as the president of the National Union of Women of Ecuador and for the next few years worked on a project for the Provincial Council of Esmeraldas to build a botanical garden for the town. The project was never completed and she returned to writing, producing a collection of fifty poems titled, Las Voces de la Vida focused on environmental themes. In 1981, she published an article "La Música Popular y la Mujer" (Popular Music and Women) in Revista Cultura, which examined the degrading lyrics in popular music which glorify abuse of women.

Beginning in 1983, Chiriboga became involved in the Congress of Black Culture, participating in the event held in Cali, Colombia and the 1985 Congress in Panama. These conventions, inspired her to begin work on her novel Bajo la piel de los tambores, Tambores bajo mi piel (1999) (Under the Skin of the Drums). The novel, published in 1991, marked an emergence of Afro-Latina identity into what had been either a homogenized Hispanic literary tradition or an Afro-Hispanic tradition focusing on male protagonists. Not only did it introduce race, but the work encompassed topics often avoided in Hispanic literature, such as birth control, fetishism, sexual violence, and others. It received favorable critical attention, as had a short story she published while she was working on the novel, called "El Cristo de la mirada baja". The story won first prize in 1986 in the International Literary Contest of the Liberator General San Martín held in Buenos Aires.

Chiriboga's works challenge the stereotypes of women's sexuality, and looks at desire, ignoring the traditions of propriety imposed by patriarchal honor codes and religious authority. She confronts stereotypical ideas of clerical purity by depicting their sensuality and lustful black women with characters who are asexual. Recognizing that men writing about women tend to poeticize them, Chiriboga uses her voice to raise consciousness. She also questions the duality of culture and what it means to be part of the African Diaspora in a country dominated by Latino and mestizo traditions. She has been a featured speaker at conferences and seminars throughout Africa, the Americas, the Caribbean and Europe, and has had her works translated into English, French, Italian and Quechua.

== Selected works ==
- Chiriboga, Luz Argentina (January 1991). "Vituperio/Epistola a Orula". Afro-Hispanic Review (in Spanish). 10 (1). Nashville, Tennessee: Department of Spanish and Portuguese, Vanderbilt University: 24. ISSN 0278-8969.
- Chiriboga, Luz Argentina (1991). Bajo la piel de los tambores: novela (in Spanish). Quito, Ecuador: Editorial Casa de la Cultura Ecuatoriana. OCLC 24598150.
- Chiriboga, Luz Argentina (1992). La contraportada del deseo (in Spanish). Quito, Ecuador: Talleres Gráficos de Abya Ayala. OCLC 29235364.
- Chiriboga, Luz Argentina; López, Kléver (1992). Manual de ecología (in Spanish). Quito, Ecuador: Abrapalabra Editores. OCLC 36655691.
- Chiriboga, Luz Argentina (1994). Jonatás y Manuela (in Spanish). Quito, Ecuador: Abrapalabra Editores. ISBN 978-9978-62-301-5.
- Chiriboga, Luz Argentina (1995). Escritores esmeraldeños: raíces, biografía, producción, y crítica. Serie Medio milenio (in Spanish). Vol. 16. Quito, Ecuador: Editorial e Imprenta Delta. OCLC 659686264.
- Chiriboga, Luz Argentina (1996). Drums under my skin. translated by Mary Arthurlene Harris (1st English ed.). Washington, D.C.: Afro-Hispanic Institute. ISBN 978-0-939423-04-0.
- Chiriboga, Argentina (1997). En la noche del viernes (in Spanish). Quito, Ecuador: SINAB. ISBN 978-9978-92-154-8.
- Chiriboga, Luz Argentina (1997). Diáspora por los caminos de Esmeraldas: decimas, cuentos, adivinanzas, leyendas, coplas, refranes, dichos, rompecabezas, trabalenguas, chigualo, arrullos, recetas de cocina (in Spanish). Quito, Ecuador: Ardilla Editores. OCLC 659389441.
- Chiriboga, Luz Argentina (1999). Tambores bajo mi piel: novela (in Spanish) (3. ed.). Quito, Ecuador: Instituto andino de artes populares. ISBN 978-9978-60-027-6.
- Chiriboga, Luz Argentina (1999). Palenque: décimas (in Spanish) (1st ed.). Quito, Ecuador: IADAP-Inst. Andino de Artes Populares. ISBN 978-9978-60-049-8.
- Chiriboga, Luz Argentina (2001). Luis Vargas Torres y los niños (in Spanish). Esmeraldas, Ecuador: Ediciones Consejo Provincial de Esmeraldas. OCLC 191071217.
- Chiriboga, Luz Argentina (2001). Coplas afro-esmeraldeñas: recopilación (in Spanish). Esmeraldas, Ecuador: Ediciones Consejo Provincial de Esmeraldas. OCLC 796377816.
- Chiriboga, Luz Argentina (2002). Cuéntanos abuela: novela para niños (in Spanish). Quito, Ecuador: Autor. OCLC 757179492.
- Chiriboga, Luz Argentina (2002). Capitanas de historia: poesia (in Spanish). Quito, Ecuador: Autor. OCLC 52937718.
- Chiriboga, Luz Argentina; Rumazo, Lupe; Viteri, Eugenia (2004). Cuentos de mujer (in Spanish). Quito, Ecuador: Campaña Nacional Eugenio Espejo por el Libro y la Lectura. ISBN 978-9978-317-16-7.
- Chiriboga, Argentina (2009). On Friday night. translated by Bankay, Anne-María and Ramsay, Paulette A. Kingston, Jamaica: Arawak Publications. ISBN 978-976-8189-73-8.
- Chiriboga, Luz Argentina (2010). La nariz del diablo (in Spanish). Quito, Ecuador: Campaña Nacional Eugenio Espejo por el Libro y la Lectura. ISBN 978-9978-317-86-0.
- Chiriboga, Luz Argentina (2013). Los trenes quieren ser pájaros: cuentos (in Spanish). Esmeraldas, Ecuador: Casa de la Cultura Ecuatoriana "Benjamín Carrión". OCLC 913891775.
- Chiriboga, Luz Argentina (12 March 2015). The Devil's Nose. translated by Miller, Ingrid Watson and Morris, Margaret L. New York, New York: Page Publishing. ISBN 978-1-63417-690-3.
