= Dobrota =

Dobrota Доброта
- Town
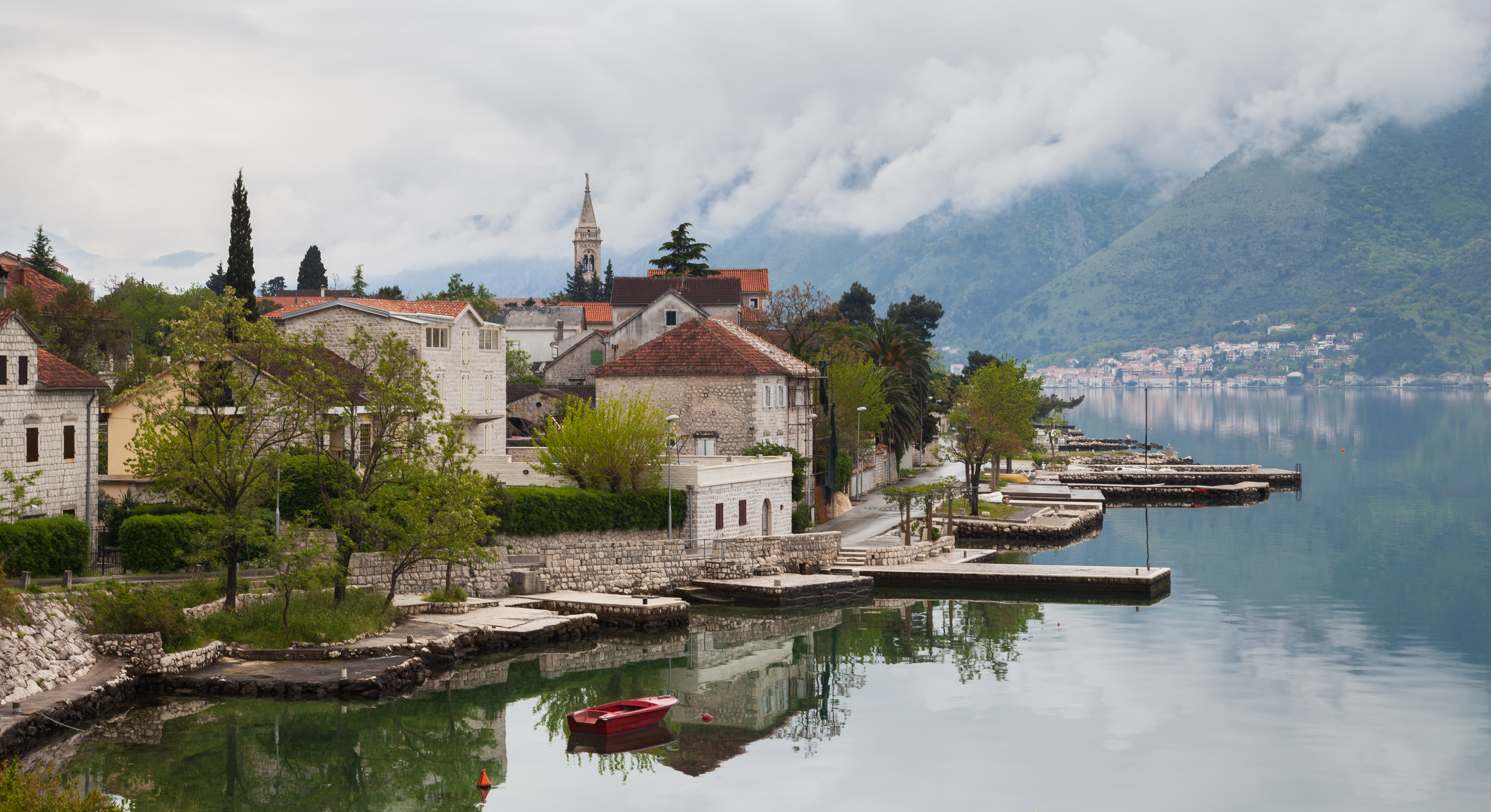
- Dobrota

- Location within Montenegro
- Country: Montenegro
- Region: Coastal
- Municipality: Kotor

Population (2023)
  - Total: 7,345
- Time zone: UTC+1 (CET)
  - Summer (DST): UTC+2 (CEST)
- Postal code: 85331

Dobrota (Montenegrin: Доброта) is a town in the municipality of Kotor, Montenegro.

Although administratively a separate settlement, it is de facto a part of Kotor as it encompasses most of Kotor's residential area, while the settlement of Kotor administratively encompasses only the town's historical core. It gained somewhat of a notoriety among the locals, as the home of Montenegro's only psychiatric hospital.

== Geography ==
Dobrota is situated in the vicinity of the old town of Kotor towards the mountain and peninsula of Vrmac and the town of Prčanj. The town stretches from Kotor to the village of Ljuta, and the river of the same name in the north, where the northern border of the city of Kotor is located, in the length of 7 kilometers.

== History ==
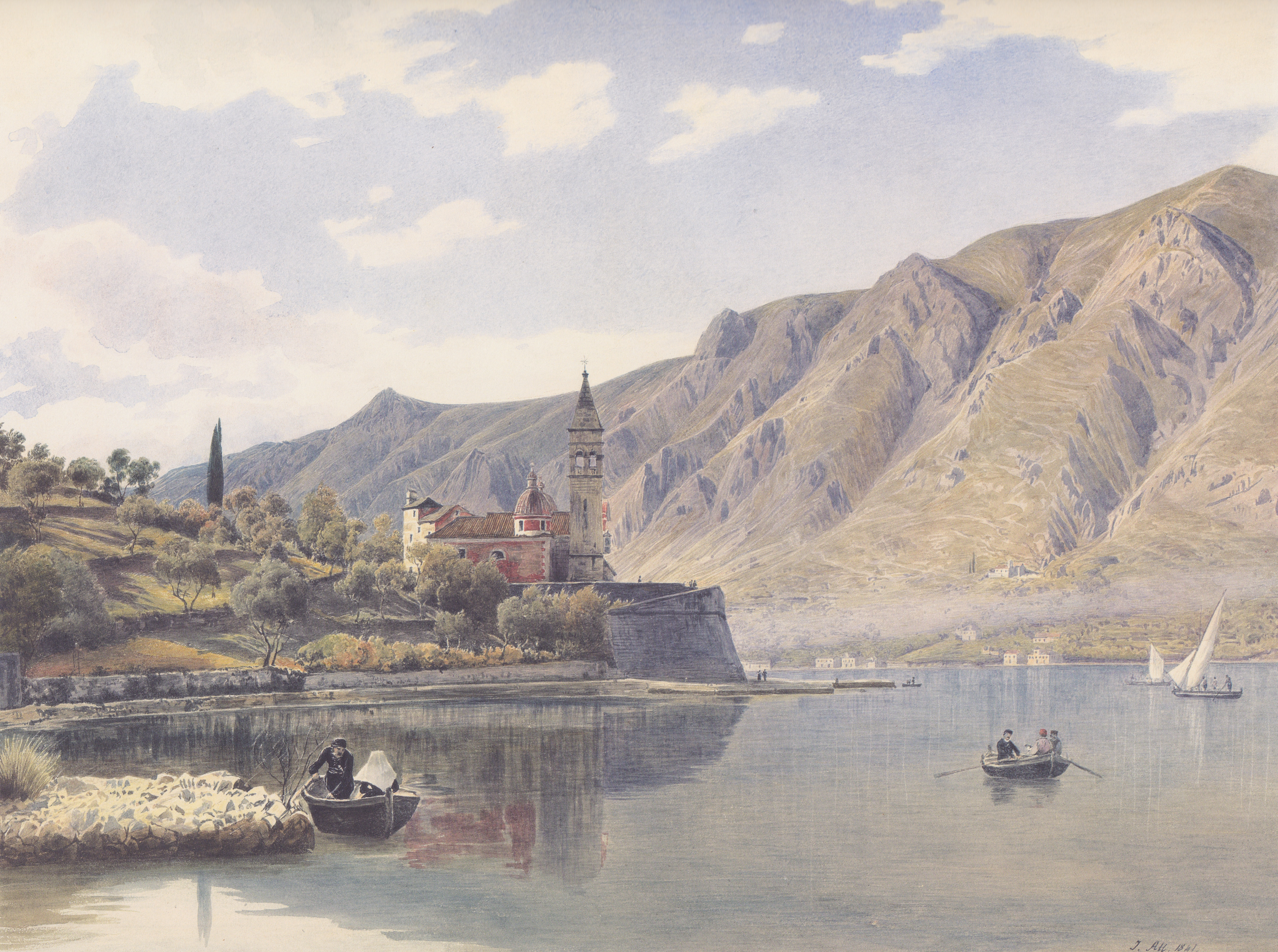
Dobrota painted by Rudolf von Alt, 1841

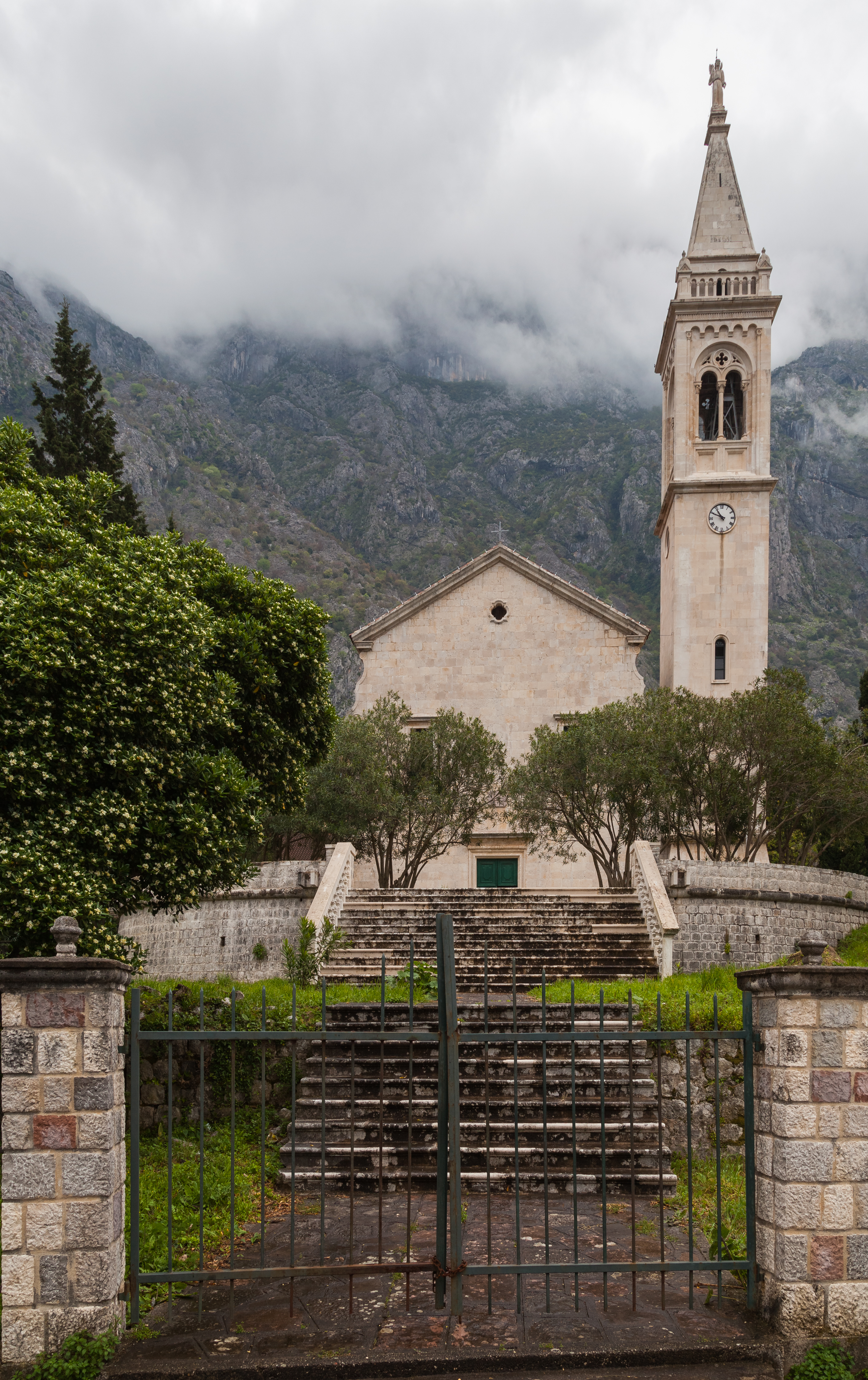
Saint Eustace Church in Dobrota

Dobrota is first mentioned in the Archives of Kotor in the year 1260 AD, as Dabrathum, and afterwards as Dobrotha, from which the modern name derives. The town experienced its own renaissance in the seventeenth and the nineteenth centuries when it had the most ships in the bay. Njegoš considered the Roman Catholics in the town as Serbs, writing to them the poem A Serb thanks the Serbs in honour.

Displeased with French rule, the inhabitants of the Bay of Kotor joined with their brethren in the interior led by Petar I Petrović-Njegoš, Prince-Bishop of Montenegro and the British Royal Navy and successfully defeated the French occupiers. Upon victory, it was in Dobrota that the Central Commission was organized to rule the Bay of Kotor jointly with the Prince-Bishopric in 1814. This lasted for a mere six months, as the bay was that same year placed under control of the Austrian Empire at the Congress of Vienna, against the wishes of its inhabitants.

== Demographics ==
Nationality	Number
Montenegrins	4,550
Croats	1,535
Serbs	1,067
Yugoslavs	51
ethnic Muslims	35
Albanians	32
Macedonians	14
Hungarians	14
Russians	14
Roma	11
Italians	9
Germans	7
Slovenes	7
Egyptians	5
Bosniaks	3
Others	57
Undefined/Undeclared	801
Regional Affiliation	42
Unknown	37
Total	8,291

== People from Dobrota ==
- Dragutin Radimir (1889–1983), Forestry Engineer
- Andjela Vukadinovic-Miss Montenegro 2023
