= Infineon Technologies Austria =

Infineon Technologies Austria AG
- Infineon Group logo
- Industry: Semiconductors
- Headquarters: Villach, Carinthia, Austria
- Key people: Sabine Herlitschka (CEO and Technology Director); Jörg Eisenschmied (CFO); Thomas Reisinger (Operations Director)
- Website: www.infineon.com/cms/austria/en/

Infineon Technologies Austria is a group subsidiary of Infineon Technologies. It employs 3785 people in around 60 countries with a large proportion in research (over 1500). In 2017 the company made a turnover of €2.5 billion. Its headquarters are in Villach, Austria.

== History ==
In 1970 Siemens launched a production site for diodes in Villach and started construction of production plants on its current site in 1972. In 1999 Siemens semiconductor division became Infineon Technologies. The production site has continuously expanded with increasing wafer sizes being introduced (4-inch wafers in 1979, 5-inch wafers in 1984, 6-inch wafers in 1997, 8-inch wafers in 2000, 12-inch thin wafers in 2013).

Villach has several important roles within the Infineon Group. It became Infineon's global competence centre for power electronics in 1997 and for contactless technologies in 1998. In 2003 the headquarters for industrial electronics were partially transferred to Villach. A global competence centre for silicon carbide (SiC) and gallium nitride (GaN) was founded in Villach in 2017.

Worldwide Locations of Infineon Technologies Austria AG
Year	Location	Type
1970	Villach, Austria	Headquarters, research & development, production, IT, global business responsibility
1998	Graz, Austria	Development centre, Global competence centre
1999	Linz, Austria	Development centre
2004	Klagenfurt, Austria	IT services
2006	Bucharest, Romania	Development centre
2006	Kulim, Malaysia	Front-end factory
	Vienna, Austria	Sales
2023	Innsbruck, Austria	Systems Competence Center

In December 2017, it was announced that Infineon is planning to create up to 1000 new jobs in its locations in Villach, Graz, and Linz. It will invest around €40 million to expand the production site in Villach. However, Infineon is faced with difficulties in filling open positions.

In 2017 Infineon Austria was awarded the HERMES.Wirtschafts.Preis in the category International Companies.

== Production ==
Infineon Technologies Austria currently has 1844 products in its portfolio. In 2016/17 it produced 14.3 billion chips. Infineon Austria holds the global business responsibility for 11 product lines, including Industrial Power Control (Chips & Discretes, Intelligent Power Modules, Gate Driver), Automotive (High Voltage Driver, Electric Drive Train), Power Management & Multimarket Security (Medium Voltage Power Conversion, Computing, Power Management Devices, Power Management ICs, High Voltage Power Conversion, Low Power ACDC ICs), and Chip Card & Security.

Infineon Austria has a total cleanroom area of 22,200 m2 (up to class 1).

== Research ==
Infineon Technologies Austria is the most research-intense company in Austria. 23% of its total revenue is spent on research & development, employing more than 1500 people in research & development (R&D). In 2016/17 Infineon spent €428 million on R&D, which represented 17% of its sales. In 2016/17 it applied for 214 patents.

Infineon Austria also supports six endowed professorships at universities in Austria: Power Electronics (University of Innsbruck), Data Science (Technical University Graz), Autonomous Driving (Technical University Graz), Human-Centered Cyber-Physical Production and Assembly Systems (Technical University Vienna), Industry 4.0 – adaptive and connected production systems (University of Klagenfurt), and Sustainable Energy Management (University of Klagenfurt).

In 2023, Infineon launched two new research projects.

- The Affordable smart GaN IC solutions for greener applications (ALL2GaN) project is about improving energy efficiency, by as much as 30%, through the use of energy saving gallium nitride semiconductors. This technology has the potential to save a projected 218 million tons of CO_{2} worldwide.
- The Artificial Intelligence in Manufacturing leading to Sustainability and Industry 5.0 (AIMS5.0) project focuses on optimizing the management of supply chains across Europe along with resource-efficient manufacturing across industries through the integration of artificial intelligence (AI).

== Management ==
The current board consists of Dipl. Ing. Dr. Sabine Herlitschka, MBA, Chief Executive Officer since April 2014, Mag. Jörg Eisenschmied, Chief Financial Officer since November 2023, and Dr. Thomas Reisinger, board member in charge of Operations since April 2014.

The supervisory board members are Dr. Reinhard Ploss (Chairman of the Executive Board, Member of the Board - Infineon Technologies AG), Dominik Asam (First Deputy Chairman of the Executive Board, Member of the Board - Infineon Technologies AG), Jochen Hanebeck (Second Deputy Chairman of the Executive Board, Member of the Board - Infineon Technologies AG), Wolfgang Knoll (Member of the Supervisory Board), Brigitte Ederer (Member of the Supervisory Board), Robert Müllneritsch (Member of the Supervisory Board, Member of the Infineon Workers Council - Villach), Gerhard Kuchling (Member of the Supervisory Board, Member of the Infineon Workers Council - Villach), and Harald Dewath (Member of the Supervisory Board, Member of the Infineon Workers Council - Villach).

== Affiliated companies ==
Danube Integrated Circuit Engineering (DICE)

DICE is a development center focusing on high-frequency parts with over 120 employees. Its headquarters are in Linz, Austria. It was created in 1999 as a spin-out from the Johannes Kepler University. Its development team were the first to present a 77 GHz radar chip using silicon-germanium technology.

KAI Kompetenzzentrum Automobil- & Industrieelektronik GmbH

The KAI was founded in 2006 with the help of fund from both the Austrian Research Promotion Agency (FFG) and the Carinthian Economic Promotion Fund (KWF). It is a 100% owned subsidiary of Infineon Technologies Austria. Its headquarters are in the Technology Park in Villach, Austria. The KAI focuses on technology and product development, characterisation, analysis and testing of materials and devices, simulation, and power device reliability.

Infineon Technologies IT Services GmbH

Founded in 2004, it is responsible for the world-wide IT infrastructure of the Infineon Group. Furthermore, it covers parts of the Factory Integration and IT Enterprise Application Platforms divisions of Infineon. Its headquarters are in the Lakeside Science & Technology Park in Klagenfurt, Austria.

Infineon Technologies Romania SCS

Founded in 2005, this subsidiary acts as a development centre focusing mainly on power semiconductors. It is based in Bucharest, Romania.

Infineon Technologies (Kulim)

This subsidiary, which was founded in 2006, is a front-end factory manufacturing logic and power semiconductors for the automotive and industrial market. It is located in the Kulim High-Tech Park in Malaysia.
