= Enrique Cadenas =

- Occupations: Professor of Pharmacology & Pharmaceutical Sciences

Academic background
- Education: MD, PhD, University of Buenos Aires, Argentina

Academic work
- Discipline: Pharmacology, pharmaceutical sciences, gerontology
- Institutions: University of Southern California

Enrique Cadenas is the Charles Krown Professor of Pharmacology and Pharmaceutical Sciences at the USC Alfred E. Mann School of Pharmacy and Pharmaceutical Sciences at the University of Southern California. He has worked on the molecular mechanisms inherent in brain aging and neurodegenerative diseases.

== Career ==
He earned an MD and PhD in biochemistry at the University of Buenos Aires, then did postdoctoral work at the Johnson Research Foundation, University of Pennsylvania and the Department of Physiological Chemistry, University of Düsseldorf.

He is a past president of the Society for Free Radical Research International (SFRRI) and serves as scientific advisor for Society for Free Radical Research Europe. He serves on the editorial boards of the journals Free Radical Biology and Medicine, Antioxidants & Redox Signaling, and Free Radical Research.

== Research ==
Cadenas' research focuses on free-radical biochemistry, oxidative stress, antioxidant therapy, aging and mitochondria.

With Lester Packer, he co-edited “Understanding the Process of Aging: The Roles of Mitochondria: Free Radicals and Antioxidants” and “Handbook of Antioxidants” (2001). With Henry Jay Forman, he co-edited Oxidative Stress and Signal Transduction (1997). He contributed a chapter, “Oxidative Stress and Formation of Excited Species,” to Helmut Sies' 1985 book “Oxidative Stress.”

== Awards ==
In 2012, by order of French President Nicolas Sarkozy, Cadenas and fellow USC professor Kelvin J.A. Davies were named chevaliers of l'Ordre du National du Merite for their scientific contributions and collaborations in France. In 2018, he and Davies were promoted to the rank of Officer.

He received an honorary doctorate from the University of Coimbra. He received the 2018 SFRRI Trevor Slater Award and the 2025 SFRRI Alberto Boveris Award.

== Selected Publications ==
- "Production of Superoxide Radicals and Hydrogen Peroxide by NADH-Ubiquinone Reductase and Ubiquinol-Cytochrome c Reductase from Beef-Heart Mitochrondria," Archives of Biochemistry and Biophysics (1977)
- "Role of Ubiquinone in the Mitochondrial Generation of Hydrogen Peroxide," Biochem J (1976)
- "Redox and Addition Chemistry of Quinoid Compounds and its Biological Implications," Free Radical Biology and Medicine (1989)
- "Biochemistry of Oxygen Toxicity," Annual Review of Biochemistry (1989)
- "Mitochondrial Free Radical Generation, Oxidative Stress, and Aging," Free Radical Biology and Medicine (2000)
