= Dragutin Radimir =

Yugoslav forestry engineer

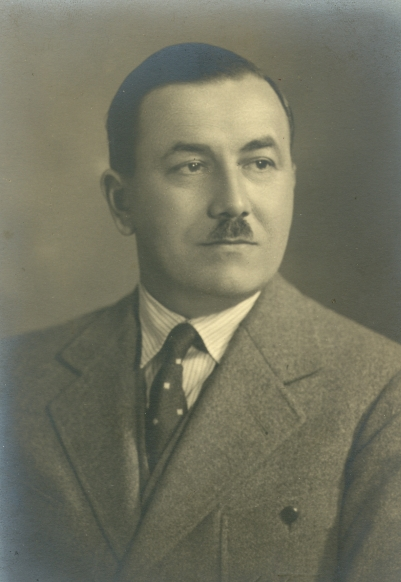
- Born: Dragutin Radimir; August 3, 1889; Dobrota, Bay of Kotor, Austro-Hungarian Monarchy
- Died: December 26, 1983 (aged 94); Belgrade, FR Yugoslavia
- Other name: Drago Radimir
- Education: Gymnasium in Kotor; Die Hochschule fur Bodenkultur in Vienna
- Occupation: Forestry Engineer
- Spouse: Angela Radimir Radoničić Marija Macolić Radimir
- Children: Vjera Popović Radimir and Nada Radimir
- Parent(s): Vjekoslav and Zorka Radimir

Dragutin Drago Radimir (August 3, 1889 - December 26, 1983) was a forestry engineer, senior government advisor, forestry expert, associate scientific consultant to Forestry Encyclopedia in Yugoslavia.

== Biography ==
Radimir was born in the village of Dobrota in the Bay of Kotor, at the time part of the Austro-Hungarian Monarchy, to father Vjekoslav and mother Zorka née. Kamenarović.

He attended Gymnasium in Kotor, at the time under the Austro-Hungarian Monarchy, and later enrolled at University in Prague and Vienna. He graduated in 1912 at the University of Vienna Faculty for Soil Culture in the class of dipl.ing. Radimir Karl.

As World War I ended in 1918 and the Kingdom of Serbs, Croats and Slovenes was created, he served as a forestry engineer in Ilidža near Sarajevo.

Between 1920 and 1937 he was a forestry engineer in the directorate of forests for the Drina Banovina.

In 1938 he was transferred to the same position but in Mostar, for the Littoral Banovina. He stayed there until 1939 when he moved to Zagreb.

Between 1939 and 1941 he worked at the Department of Forestry of the Banovina of Croatia as a senior advisor.

During World War II, he worked in Zagreb in the laboratories of the company "La Roche".

In 1945 he was employed at the Ministry of Forestry Zagreb, SFR Yugoslavia as a senior government adviser. He worked there until his retirement in 1950.

After World War II he wrote and published many papers on the utilization of forestry by-products, especially resins.

As an amateur photographer, he compiled a remarkable collection of photographs of forests and their by-products. He gave the collection to a forestry company "Šipad" in Sarajevo. Unfortunately the whole collection was destroyed during the civil war in the nineties.

Drago Radimir's principal occupation was reforestation in Bosnia and Herzegovina, Croatia, and Serbia. To his merit was the introduction of the Serbian Spruce (Serbian: Pančićeva omorika) in Zagreb's parks and in other parts of former Yugoslavia. Several Sequoia (Redwood) trees on the Croatian and Montenegrin coast were planted by him and his co-workers.

In 1962 Radimir was awarded a gold certificate at the college for soil culture in Vienna at the 50th anniversary of his graduation (1912 to 1962).

He was a member of the Croatian Mountaineering Association before the Second World War, and the mountain society Zagreb since its inception. As a mountaineer he visited many European mountains, some in North America, photographed them and lectured. He was an associate member and a member of the Forestry section of the Društvo inženjera i tehničara (Society of Engineers of Yugoslavia that existed as a single organization between 1945 and 1951; afterwards the Society of Engineers of Croatia).

Radimir's first marriage was with to Angela née. Radoničić, and the pair had daughters Vjera (married Popović) and Nada. Second marriage was with Marija Macolić.

He died in Belgrade, SFR Yugoslavia.

== Selected works ==
- Iskorišćivanje šuma. Sporedni užici. (Gospodarenje na planinskim pašnjacima). Šumarski priručnik, Zagreb 1946., s. 1144–1155.
- Kakvo drvo traži brodograđevna industrija. Drvna ind. 6., Zagreb 1951., s. 1–4.
- Borba protiv šumskih požara. Š.L. 3–4, 1952., s.174
- Publicazioni della Statione sperimentale di selvicoltura No 7. Š.L. 8–10, 1951., s.351
- Messeri: Anatomska istraživanja smolarevih borova. Š.L. 4, 1952., s.127
- L´Italia forestale e montana: Ljekovito bilje rabarbara treba uzgajati u brdskim krajevima. Š.L. 4, 1952., s.128,
- Šumarstvo u Engleskoj. Š.L. 9, 1952., s.341
- Monti e boschi: Utjecaj potaše i svijetla na otpornost sadnica protiv mrazu i studeni.Š.L. 9, 1952., s.342
- Nova metoda za uzgajanje sadnica umjetnim svijetlom. Š.L. 9, 1952., s.343
- Uzgojna mjera kojoj se u nas ne poklanja dovoljno pažnje. Š.L. 10–11, 1952., s.416
- O uspjehu sadnje pri pošumljavanju. Š.L. 12, 1952., s.481
- Razvoj smolarenja stimulacijom, proizvodnja i izvoz terpentina i kolofona u SAD. Š.L. 12, 1952., s.482
- Nova metoda za uzgajnje biljaka vještačkim svijetlom. Š.L. 12, 1952., s.491
- Mogućnost današnje orijentacije u smolarskoj industriji Italije. Š.L. 1, 1953., s.52
- Pošumljavanje goleti u raznim evropskim državama posljednjih godina. Š.L. 1, 1953., s.54
- Kako gledaju strani stručnjci na šumarstvo Jugoslavije. Š.L. 2, 1953., s.95
- Pejoski-Radimir: Savremeni pogledi na stimulirano smolarenje. Š.L. 4–5, 1953., s.206
- Proizvodnja, potrošnja i trgovina drvetom u Evropi. Izgledi u budućnosti. Š.L. 6, 1953., s.284
- Fotografska snimanja šuma i šumskih objekata. Š.L. 7–8, 1953., s.347
- Razvoj smolarenja u NR Hrvatskoj i proizvodnja smole u svijetu. Š.L. 11, 1953., s.458
- Još o našim nacionalnim parkovima i umjetnim nasadima. Š.L. 11, 1953., s.481
- Uspomene na velikog šumarskog entomologa Karla Eschericha. Š.L. 7, 1954., s.325
- Istraživanja za povećanje plovnosti oblovine lišćara u SSSR-u. Š.L. 9–10, 1954., s.534
- Radovi na uzgajanju borovih sastojina sa visokim intenzitetom lučenja smole. Narodni šumar 11–12, Sarajevo 1955., s. 461–469.
- O značenju uzgoja šumsko-voćnog drveća i grmlja na području NR Hrvatske. Š.L. 3–4, 1955., s.94
- Proizvodnja borove smole u Francuskoj god. 1952/53. Š.L. 3–4, 1955., s.130
- O racionalnijem iskorišćivanju naših borovih šuma smolarenjem. Šumarstvo 7–8, Beograd 1955., s. 435–452.
- Borovi na granici šumske vegetacije. Šumarstvo 7–8, Beograd, 1957.
- O uzgoju bambusa. Š.L. 11–12, 1957., s.449
- Proizvodnja ploča vlaknatica i iverica u svijetu (prema Unasylva 1957.). Š.L. 1–2, 1958., s.75
- Racionalizacija u iskorištavanju smole sa borovih stabala na području USA, (Prema Naval Sores Review ö 1957.). Š.L. 1–2, 1958., s.75
- Kako povećati proizvodnju smole. Narodni šumar, Sarajevo 1961.

== Sources ==
- Forestry encyclopaedia, I. Published by Yugoslav Lexicographical Institute, MCMLXIII (1963). "Radimir, Dragutin, forestry expert", pp. 368
- Karton osobe: RADIMIR, Dragutin, Imenik hrvatskih šumara, Published by the Croatian Forestry Society
