= Nelson Estupiñán Bass =

Ecuadorian writer

- Born: 19 September 1912; Súa, Atacames Canton, Esmeraldas Province, Ecuador
- Died: 3 March 2002 (aged 89); Hershey, Pennsylvania, United States
- Occupations: Writer & poet
- Writing career
- Notable awards: Premio Eugenio Espejo (1993)

Nelson Estupiñán Bass (1912–2002) was an Ecuadorian writer. He was born in Súa, a city in the predominantly Afro-Ecuadorian province of Esmeraldas in Ecuador. He was first homeschooled by his mother before traveling to the capital city of Quito where he graduated from Escuela Superior Juan Montalvo with a degree in public accounting in 1932. Bass identified with the Communist Party during this time and in 1934 had the opportunity to publish two of his poems (Canto a la Negra Quinceañera and Anúteba) in the socialist diary La Tierra.

== Career ==
In 1943, Bass completed the novel, When the Guayacanes Were in Bloom (Cuando Los Guayacanes Florecían), one of his most famous and widely read literary projects throughout Ecuador and Latin America. It was published in 1950 by the Casa de la Cultura Ecuatoriana. The novel expresses the fraught situation of Afro-Ecuadorians used as pawns to fight for the Conservative Party and Liberal Party during the Liberal Revolution in Ecuador of 1895. Bass was influenced by global Pan-Africanism and invoked an identifiably black aesthetic and political project in his writings and lectures during the 1940s and 50s.

In 1962, Bass married Luz Argentina Chiriboga, who later became known for writing on Afro-Ecuadorian and feminist themes. In 1966 Bass was the first president of a regional museum of the national Casa de la Cultura Ecuatoriana in Esmeraldas called Archaeological Museum "Carlos Mercado Ortiz".

Bass was nominated for the Nobel Prize in Literature in 1998. While giving a series of lectures in 2002 at Penn State University Bass became ill with pneumonia and succumbed to the deadly illness at the Hershey Medical Center. Bass is remembered as one of Ecuador's most prolific Afro-Latin American writers and represents a South American expression of the African Diaspora

== Works ==
=== Novels ===
- —— (1954). Cuando los guayacanes florecían. Quito: Casa de la cultura ecuatoriana. OCLC 295454.
- —— (1958). El paraíso. Quito: Casa de la cultura ecuatoriana. OCLC 9177377.
- —— (1966). El último río. Quito: Casa de la cultura ecuatoriana. OCLC 307586.
- —— (1974). Senderos brillantes. Quito: Casa de la cultura ecuatoriana. OCLC 1978045.
- —— (1978). Las puertas del verano. Quito: Casa de la cultura ecuatoriana. OCLC 4313590.
- —— (1978). Toque de queda. Guayaquil: Casa de la cultura ecuatoriana. OCLC 4864985.
- —— (1981). Bajo el cielo nublado. Quito: Casa de la cultura ecuatoriana. OCLC 8485923.
- —— (1993). Los canarios pintaron el aire de amarillo. Ediciones Ciencia y cultura (1st ed.). Ibarra, Ecuador: Editorial Universitaria, Universidad Técnica del Norte. ISBN 978-9978-82-366-8.
- —— (1994). Al norte de Dios. Quito: Casa de la cultura ecuatoriana. OCLC 32349837.

=== Poetry ===
- —— (1954). Canto negro por la luz: Poemas para negros y blancos (in Spanish). Esmeraldas: Ediciones del Nucleo Provincial de Esmeraldas de la Casa de la Cultura Ecudatoriana. OCLC 5431937.
- —— (1956). Timarán y Cuabú: Cuaderno de poesía para el pueblo (in Spanish). Quito: Casa de la cultura ecuatoriana. OCLC 5291318.
- —— (1971). Las huellas digitales (in Spanish). Quito: Casa de la cultura ecuatoriana. OCLC 1147563.
- —— (1973). Las tres carabelas: poesía, relato, teatro (in Spanish). Portoviejo: Gregorio. OCLC 12077170.
- —— (1980), Negra bullanguera

=== Essays and criticism ===
- Luces que titilan: guía de la vieja Esmeraldas (Esmeraldas, 1977)
- Viaje alrededor de la poesía negra (Quito, 1982)
- Desde un balcón volado (Quito, 1992)
- El Crepúsculo (1983)
