= Wilhelm Neurath =

Austrian political economist (1840–1901)

Wilhelm Neurath (Austrian German: [ˈvɪlhɛlm ˈnɔʏraːt]; 31 May 1840 – 9 March 1901) was an Austrian political economist of the late nineteenth century. He was professor of economics at the University of Natural Resources and Life Sciences in Vienna.

He was the father of Otto Neurath.

== Biography ==
Neurath was born in Svätý Jur (Pozsony County, Kingdom of Hungary, Austrian Empire) into a poor but pious Jewish family. He left home to attend primary school between the ages of 9 and 12, but after only one year in secondary school, his parents were unable to continue to afford his education. They were also concerned that further study might erode his alignment with their religion. However, by supporting himself as an assistant teacher, he was able, from the age of thirteen, to continue his education, learning Latin by helping others to learn it.

At the age of seven, he recalled, he was "deeply stirred" by his father's fanatical religious condemnations and sought solace in his own company wandering in the forests. Strengthened from his dreams about "God's ways", he turned to science, particularly physics and astronomy, his favourite book being Lagrange's Mécanique analytique (1788). Soon he added ethnology and philology to his range of interests. However, after providing mathematical training to a philosophical writer, he read Kant's Critique of Pure Reason and consequently embraced materialism and atheism.

After gaining his doctorate he became a Privatdozent at the Vienna University of Technology.

He died in Vienna.

== Publications ==
- Volkswirthschaftliche und Socialphilosophische Essays (Vienna: Faesy & Frick, 1880)
- Elemente der Volkswirthschaftslehre (Vienna, 1882)
- System der Sozialen und Politischen Oekonomie (ed. 1885)
- Das Recht auf Arbeit und das Sittliche in der Volkswirthschaft (ed. 1886)
- Wahre Ursachen der Überproduktionskrisen (1892)
- Das Sinken des Zinsfusses (ed. 1893)
- Die Fundamente der Volkswirthschaftslehre: Kritik und Neugestaltung (Leipzig, 1894), first published in Rothschilds Taschenbuch für Kaufleute
- Das Hauptproblem der Modernen Volkswirtschaft (Vienna, 1899)
