= Paul Viljoen =

- Military career
- Allegiance: South Africa
- Branch: South African Navy
- Service years: 1960 - 1992
- Rank: Rear admiral
- Commands: Chief of Naval Operations; FOC Navcom East

Rear Admiral Paul Viljoen is a retired South African Navy officer, who served as Chief of Naval Operations before his retirement.

Then Commodore Viljoen was appointed Flag Officer Commanding NAVCOM East in December 1989 and promoted to rear admiral. He was appointed Chief of Naval Operations after NAVCOM East was dis-established.

He retired on 31 December 1992.

Military offices
Preceded by Post recreated	Chief of Naval Operations; 1992-1992	Succeeded by Johan Retief
Preceded by Paul Wijnberg	Flag Officer Commanding NAVCOM East; 1990-1992	Succeeded by Post abolished
