= Karl Eduard Schedl =

Austrian entomologist (1898–1979)

Karl E. Schedl
- Born: 1898
- Died: 1979 (aged 80–81)
- Scientific career
- Fields: Entomology, forest Zoology
- Institutions: University of Natural Resources and Life Sciences, Vienna

Karl E. Schedl (1898–1979) was an Austrian entomologist, specialist on Coleoptera and forest zoology. He worked at University of Natural Resources and Life Sciences, Vienna. Over a span of nearly 50 years between 1931 and 1980, Schedl created a total of 69 publications.

== Publications ==
=== 1931 ===
- Schedl, K.E., (1931) Notes on the genus Xyleborus Eichh. Annals and Magazine of Natural History ISSN 0022-2933, (10) 8, 339–347.

=== 1934 ===
- Schedl, K.E., (1934) Neue Borkenkäfer. Entomologische Blätter ISSN 0013-8835, 30(1), 37–39.

=== 1935 ===
- Schedl, K.E., (1935a) Neue Platypodiden aus Afrika, Neuguinea, Zentral-und Südamerika. Entomologische Nachrichten, 9(3), 149–154, 174–175.
- Schedl, K.E., (1935b) New barkbeetles and ambrosia-beetles (Col.). Stylops, 4(12), 270–276.
- Schedl, K.E., (1935c) Fauna Philippinensis (Platypodidae et Scolytidae), III. Philippine Journal of Science, 56(3), 395–403.
- Schedl, K.E., (1935d) Scolytidae and Platypodidae: new species from the Philippine Islands and Formosa. Philippine Journal of Science, 57(4), 479–489.
- Schedl, K.E., (1935e) Some new Platypodidae from Borneo and Malaya. Journal of the Federated Malay States Museums, 17(4), 632–642.

=== 1936 ===
- Schedl, K.E., (1936a) Notes on Malayan Scolytidae and Platypodidae and descriptions of some new species. Journal of the Federated Malay States Museums, 18(1), 1–18.
- Schedl, K.E., (1936b) Some new Scolytidae and Platypodidae from the Malay Peninsula. Journal of the Federated Malay States Museums, 18(1), 19–35, 1 fig.
- Schedl, K.E., (1936c) Platypodidae des Museo Civico di Storia Naturale di Genova. Annali del Museo Civico di Storia Naturale di Genova, 59, 43–62.
- Schedl, K.E., (1936d) Scolytidae and Platypodidae: Fauna Philippinensis, IV. Philippine Journal of Science, 60(1), 59–67.
- Schedl, K.E., (1936e) Scolytidae and Platypodidae. Contribution 35. The collection of the South Australian Museum. Records of the South Australian Museum, 5(4), 513–535.

=== 1937 ===
- Schedl, K.E., (1937a) Platypodidae des Berliner Zoologischen Museums. Entomologische Blätter ISSN 0013-8835, 33(1), 33–44.
- Schedl, K.E., (1937b) Scolytidae und Platypodidae. 34 Contribution. Fauna Borneensis, Part 1. Sarawak Museum Journal, Kuching, 4(4), 543–552.

=== 1938 ===
- Schedl, K.E., (1938a) Scolytidae und Platypodidae. Contribution 49. New species from Australia and the Fiji Islands with some revisional notes. Transactions of Royal Society of South Australia, 62, 34–52.
- Schedl, K.E., (1938b) Scolytidae and Platypodidae: Fauna Philippinensis, V. Philippine Journal of Science, 67(4), 421–429.

=== 1939 ===
- Schedl, K.E., (1939a) Malaysian Scolytidae and Platypodidae (IV). 57 Contribution. Journal of the Federated Malay States Museums, 18(3), 327–364.
- Schedl, K.E., (1939b) Die Einteilung und geographische Verbreitung der Platypodidae. Verhandllungen VII Internationaler Kongreß von Entomologie, 7(1), 377–410.

=== 1940 ===
- Schedl, K.E., (1940) Scolytidae and Platypodidae. 61 Contribution. Annals and Magazine of Natural History ISSN 0022-2933, (11) 5(29), 433–442.

=== 1941 ===
- Schedl, K.E., (1941a) Platypodiden und Scolytiden. 43 Beitrag. Revue Française d'Entomologie, 7, 152–157.
- Schedl, K.E., (1941b) Die Variations-Breite in den Platypi cupulati Chap. 73 Beitrag. Archiv für Naturgeschichte, 10(3), 416–426.

=== 1942 ===
- Schedl, K.E., (1942a) Neue Scolytidae aus Java. 76 Beitrag. Tijdschrift voor Entomologie, 85, 1–49.
- Schedl, K.E., (1942b) Interessante und neue Scolytiden und Platypodiden aus der australischen Region. 79 Beitrag. Mitteilungen der Münchener Entomologischen Gesellschaft, 32, 162–201.
- Schedl, K.E., (1942c) Forschungs-Berichte zur Scolytoiden-Fauna der malayischen Halbinsel. V. 80 Beitrag. Kolonialforstliche Mitteilungen Neudamm und Berlin, 5(2–3), 169–218.

=== 1950 ===
- Schedl, K.E., (1950) Neotropical Scolytoidea, II. 107 Contribution. Dusenia, 1(3), 145–180.

=== 1951 ===
- Schedl, K.E., (1951) Fauna Indomalayaensis, I. Tijdschrift voor Entomologie, 93, 41–98.

=== 1952 ===
- Schedl, K.E., (1952) Neotropische Scolytoidea, III. 110 Beitrag. Dusenia, 3(5), 343–366.

=== 1953 ===
- Schedl, K.E., (1953) New Scolytoidea. Queensland Museum Memoirs, 13, 80–83.

=== 1955 ===
- Schedl, K.E., (1955) Borken-und Ambrosiakäfer aus dem Pazifischen Raum. 150 Beitrag. Entomologische Arbeiten aus dem Museum G. Frey, 6, 277–310.

=== 1957 ===
- Schedl, K.E., (1957) Scolytoidea nouveaux du Congo Belge, II. Mission R. Mayne-K.E. Schedl 1952. Annales du Musee Royale du Congo Belge Tervuren (Belgique), Ser. 8, Sciences Zoologiques, 56, 1–162.

=== 1958 ===
- Schedl, K.E., (1958a) Zur Synonymie der Borkenkäfer II. 159 Beitrag. Tijdschrift voor Entomologie, 101(3–4), 141–155.

=== 1960 ===
- Schedl, K.E., (1960) Zur Synonymie der Borkenkäfer V. 181 Beitrag. Entomologische Blätter ISSN 0013-8835, 56(2), 103–112.

=== 1962 ===
- Schedl, K.E., (1962a) Scolytidae und Platypodidae aus dem australisch-polynesischen Raum. 206 Beitrag zur Mophologie und Systematik der Scolytoidea. Entomologische Arbeiten aus dem Museum G. Frey, 13(1), 72–78.
- Schedl, K.E., (1962b) Zur Synonymie der Borkenkäfer, X. 213 Beitrag. Mitteilungen der Münchener Entomologischen Gesellschaft, 52, 85–107.
- Schedl, K.E., (1962c) Synonymies of bark beetles, VII. 204 Contribution. Annals and Magazine of Natural History ISSN 0022-2933, (13) 4, 697–699.

=== 1964 ===
- Schedl, K.E., (1964a) Scolytoidea from Borneo, III. 185 Contribution. Reichenbachia ISSN 0070-7279, 4, 241–254.
- Schedl, K.E., (1964b) On some Coleoptera of economic importance from New Guinea and Australia. Pacific insects ISSN 0030-8714, 6(1), 211–214.
- Schedl, K.E., (1964c) Zur Synonymie der Borkenkäfer, XV. 228 Beitrag. Reichenbachia, 3, 303–317.
- Schedl, K.E., (1964d) Neue und interessante Scolytoidea von den Sunda-Inseln, Neue Guinea und Australien. 202 Beitrag. Tijdschrift voor Entomologie, 107(5), 297–306.

=== 1965 ===
- Schedl, K.E., (1965) Scolytidae und Platypodidae aus dem Naturhistorika Riksmuseum in Stockholm. 235 Beitrag. Arkiv för zoologi ISSN 0004-2110, (2) 18(3), 17–31.

=== 1966 ===
- Schedl, K.E., (1966a) Pin-hole borers Japanese ports. 241 Contribution to the morphology and taxonomy of the Scolytoidea. Kontyû, 34, 29–43.
- Schedl, K.E., (1966b) Etwas über die Borkenkäfer der Araucarien. 239 Beitrag. Anzeiger für Schädlingskunde, 39(3), 42–45.

=== 1968 ===
- Schedl, K.E., (1968a) On some Scolytidae and Platypodidae of economic importance from the Territory of Papua and New Guinea. 250 Contribution. Pacific Insects, 10(2), 261–270.
- Schedl, K.E., (1968b) Some interesting and new Platypodidae (Coleoptera) from New Guinea. 257 Contribution. Pacific Insects, 10, 535–537.

=== 1969 ===
- Schedl, K.E., (1969a) Scolytidae und Platypodidae aus Neu-Guinea (Coleoptera). 263 Beitrag. Opuscula Zoologica Budapest, 9(1), 155–158.
- Schedl, K.E., (1969b) Further new Scolytoidea from the territory of Papua and Guinea. 267 Contribution. The Proceedings of the Linnean Society of New South Wales, 94(3), 214–236.
- Schedl, K.E., (1969c) Zur Synonymie der Borkenkäfer, XVIII. 253 Beitrag. Entomologische Arbeiten aus dem Museum G. Frey, 20, 79–105.

=== 1970 ===
- Schedl, K.E., (1970a) Another collection of Scolytidae and Platypodidae of economic importance from the Territory of Papua New Guinea, 254 Contribution to the morphology and taxonomy of Scolytoidea. Proceedings of the Linnean Society, New South Wales, 94(2), 128–132.
- Schedl, K.E., (1970b) Bark beetles and pin-hole borers (Scolytidae and Platypodidae) intercepted from imported logs in Japanese ports, IV. 274 Contribution. Kontyû, 38, 353–370.

=== 1971 ===
- Schedl, K.E., (1971a) Scolytidae und Platypodidae aus dem Zoologischen Museum der Universitat in Kopenhagen (Insecta, Coleoptera). Steenstrupia, 1, 145–156.
- Schedl, K.E., (1971b) Indomalayan bark and timber beetles. 276 Contribution. Oriental Insects, 5(3), 361–399.

=== 1972 ===
- Schedl, K.E., 1972: Monographie der Familie Platypodidae Coleoptera. W. Junk, Den Haag, v + 322 pp.
- Schedl, K.E., 1972: New Scolytidae and Platypodidae from the Papuan subregion and New Caledonia, I. 271 Beitrag. Papua New Guinea Agriculture Journal, 23(3–4), 49–60.
- Schedl, K.E., 1972: Scolytidae and Platypodidae from the Papuan subregion and Australia. 279 Beitrag. Papua New Guinea Agriculture Journal, 23(3–4), 61–72.
- Schedl, K.E., 1972: Scolytidae of Ceylon. 287 Contribution. Mitteilungen der Schweizerischen Entomologischen Gesellschaft 45(1–3), 221–229.
- Schedl, K.E., 1972: Bark and timber beetles of the Pacific Islands. 282 Beitrag. New Zealand Journal of Science, 15(3), 265–272.

=== 1973 ===
- Schedl, K.E., 1973: Scolytidae and Platypodidae of the Archbold Expeditions to New Guinea. 280 Contribution. Papua New Guinea Agricultural Journal, 24(2), 70–77.
- Schedl, K.E., 1973: New Scolytidae and Platypodidae from the Papuan subregion. 299 Contribution to morphology and taxonomy of Scolytoidea. Papua New Guinea Agricultural Journal, 24(3), 87–97.

=== 1974 ===
- Schedl, K.E., 1974: New Scolytidae and Platypodidae from the Papuan subregion and New Caledonia, III. 302 Contribution. Annalen des Naturhistorischen Museums in Wien, 79, 457–472.

=== 1975 ===
- Schedl, K.E., 1975: Zur Synonymie der Borkenkäfer, XXVI. 318 Beitrag. Zeitschrift der Arbeitsgemeinschaft Osterreich Entomologen, 27(1/2), 33–38.
- Schedl, K.E., 1975: Die Unterfamilie Scolytoplatypinae (Coleoptera, Scolytoidea). 307 Beitrag zur Morphologie und Systematik der Scolytoidea. Entomologische Abhandlungen Staatliches Museum für Tierkunde in Dresden, 40(7), 199–267.
- Schedl, K.E., 1975: New Scolytidae and Platypodidae from Papua New Guinea (Coleoptera). 315 Contribution to the Morphology and Taxonomy of the Scolytoidea. Reichenbachia, 15, 215–232.
- Schedl, K.E., 1975: Scolytidae und Platypodidae (Coleoptera) aus Papua-Neu-Guinea. Folia Entomologica Hungarica, 28(2), 345–348.

=== 1978 ===
- Schedl, K.E., 1978: Die Typen der Sammlung Schedl Familie Platypodidae (Coleoptera). Kataloge der wissenschaftlichen Sammlungen des Naturhistorisches Museum Wien, Entomologie, 1, 1–82.

=== 1979 ===
- Schedl, K.E., 1979: Die Typen der Sammlung Schedl Familie Scolytidae (Coleoptera). Kataloge der wissenschaftlichen Sammlungen des Naturhistorisches Museum Wien, Entomologie, 3(2), 1–286.
- Schedl, K.E., 1979: New Scolytidae and Platypodidae from Papua New Guinea V. (Coleoptera). 311 Contribution. Faunistische Abhandlungen, 7, 95–120.
- Schedl, K.E., 1979: Zur Synonymie der Borkenkäfer, XXIX. 345 Beitrag. Entomologischen Arbeiten aus dem Museum G. Frey, 28, 119–132.
- Schedl, K.E., 1979: Scolytidae aus West Irian. 338 Beitrag zur Morphologie und Systematik der Scolytoidea. Entomologische Blätter ISSN 0013-8835, 74(3), 158.

=== 1980 ===
- Schedl, K.E., 1980: Zur Synonymie der Borkenkäfer, 28. 339 Beitrag. Zeitschrift der Arbeitsgemeinschaft Osterreich Entomologen, 31(3/4), 117–124.
