= Nikolaus Berlakovich =

Austrian politician

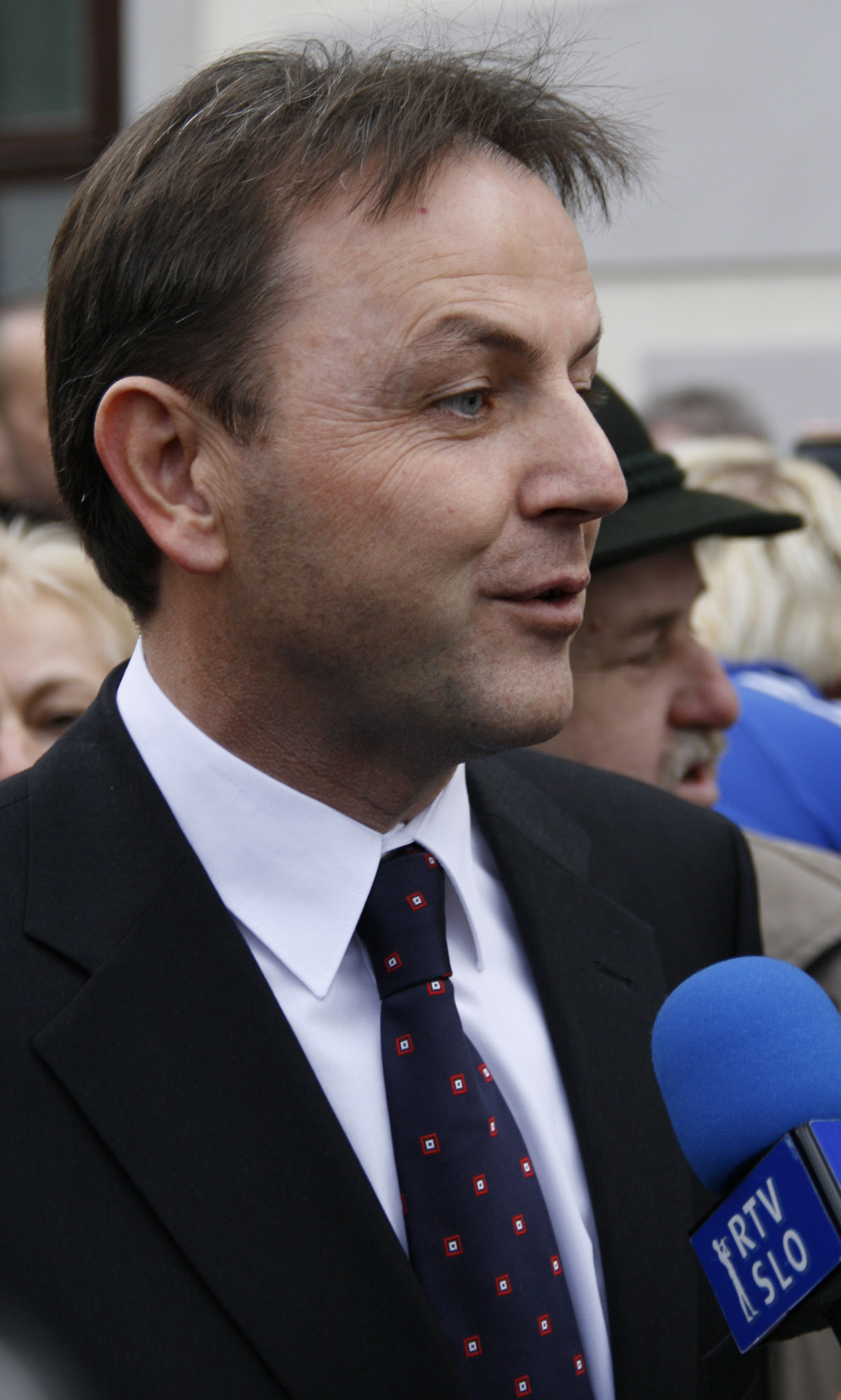
Nikolaus Berlakovich, 2 December 2008.

Nikolaus Berlakovich (born 4 June 1961 in Eisenstadt, Austria) is an Austrian politician. He served as Minister for Agriculture from 2008 to 2013 in the First Faymann cabinet and has been a member of the Austrian parliament since 2013. Prior to his tenure at federal level, he was member of the provincial parliament of Burgenland (1991–2005) and of the provincial government of Burgenland (2005-2008).

Berlakovich is part of the Burgenland Croat community. He holds a degree in agriculture from the Austrian University of Natural Resources and Life Sciences.
