= Paulette Ramsay =

Jamaican poet, translator, journalist, novelist, and academic

Paulette Ramsay is a Jamaican poet, translator, journalist, novelist, and academic who studies race relations in the Caribbean.

== Career and writing ==
She received her PhD from the University of the West Indies; was promoted to professor in the university's Department of Modern Languages & Literatures in 2017; and specializes in the field of Afro-Hispanic Studies, with a particular interest in the Afro-Mexican diaspora.

In 2003, Ramsay published a novella, Aunt Jen, a coming-of-age story told as a series of letters from a girl, Sunshine, to her absent mother. It explores themes of growing up in Jamaica in the 1970s, during the early years of the country's independence. In a review, Maureen Warner-Lewis notes Ramsay's "charmingly revelatory" narrative, and her use of code-switching in her literary style.

Ramsay has published three collections of free verse poems. Reviewer Barbara Collash describes the first volume, Under Basil Leaves (2010), as displaying a "decidedly female perspective, female sensibility," and says they "constitute a fresh poetic retelling of the black tragic."

She has also published or contributed to numerous textbooks, preparatory texts for the CAPE and CSEC exams, and academic texts.

== Honours ==
In 2014, Ramsay received the National Order of Merit from the government of France, in the rank of Chevalier.

In 2018, she received the Farquharson Institute of Public Affairs (FIPA) Award of the Century for Outstanding Scholarship in Literary and Language Studies and Creative Writing.

== Selected works ==
Fiction

- Aunt Jen (2003; novella)

Poetry

- Under Basil Leaves (2010)
- October Afternoon (2012)
- Star Apple Blue and Avocado Green (2016)

Nonfiction

- Chevere! (2008; in Spanish; with Anne-Maria Bankay, Ingrid Kemchand, and Elaine Watson-Grant)
- Blooming With The Pouis: Critical Thinking, Reading And Writing Across The Curriculum (2009)
- Afro-Mexican Constructions of Diaspora, Gender, Identity and Nation (2016)
- The Afro-Hispanic Readers and Anthology (2018; editor)

Translations

- On Friday Night, by Luz Argentina Chiriboga (2009; with Anne-Maria Bankay)
