= University of Natural Resources and Life Sciences, Vienna =

University of life sciences in Vienna, Austria

Coordinates: 48°14′12″N 16°20′14″E

- Universität für Bodenkultur Wien (BOKU)
- Motto: Science for Life
- Type: Public
- Established: 1872
- Budget: 223.8 m €
- Rector: Eva Schulev-Steindl
- Academic staff: 2,201 (December 2023)
- Administrative staff: 810 (December 2023)
- Students: 9,737 (winter semester 2023/24)
- Location: Vienna, Austria
- Website: boku.ac.at Prospectus

The University of Natural Resources and Life Sciences, Vienna (German: Universität für Bodenkultur Wien, Austrian German: [univɛrsiˈtɛːt fyːɐ̯ ˈboːdn̩kʊlˌtuːɐ̯ ˈviːn]), is a public university in Vienna, Austria. It calls itself BOKU University in English.

There are currently 10,941 students from over 100 countries enrolled at BOKU.

== Name ==
While the university calls itself BOKU University in English, Austria's Ministry of Women, Science and Research calls it the University of Natural Resources and Applied Life Sciences Vienna.

== Campus ==
After 27 years at Palais Schönborn the City of Vienna decided in 1896 to build a new campus at Türkenschanzpark in the 18th district. The departments of sustainable agriculture, soil science, horticulture, animal husbandry, economics and social sciences are still headquartered at this original campus. Another city campus, located at Muthgasse in the 19th district near the Heiligenstadt underground station, is the headquarters for the biotechnology, chemistry, plant sciences, water resource management, waste management and food sciences departments. There is also a research facility complex in Tulln, north of the city, with biotechnology and agricultural sciences laboratories and facilities. Other important locations and testing fields are Groß-Enzersdorf (Lower Austria), Jedlersdorf (Vienna), Knödelhütte (Vienna), Heuberg/Rosalia (Burgenland) and the Water Cluster Lunz am See (Lower Austria).

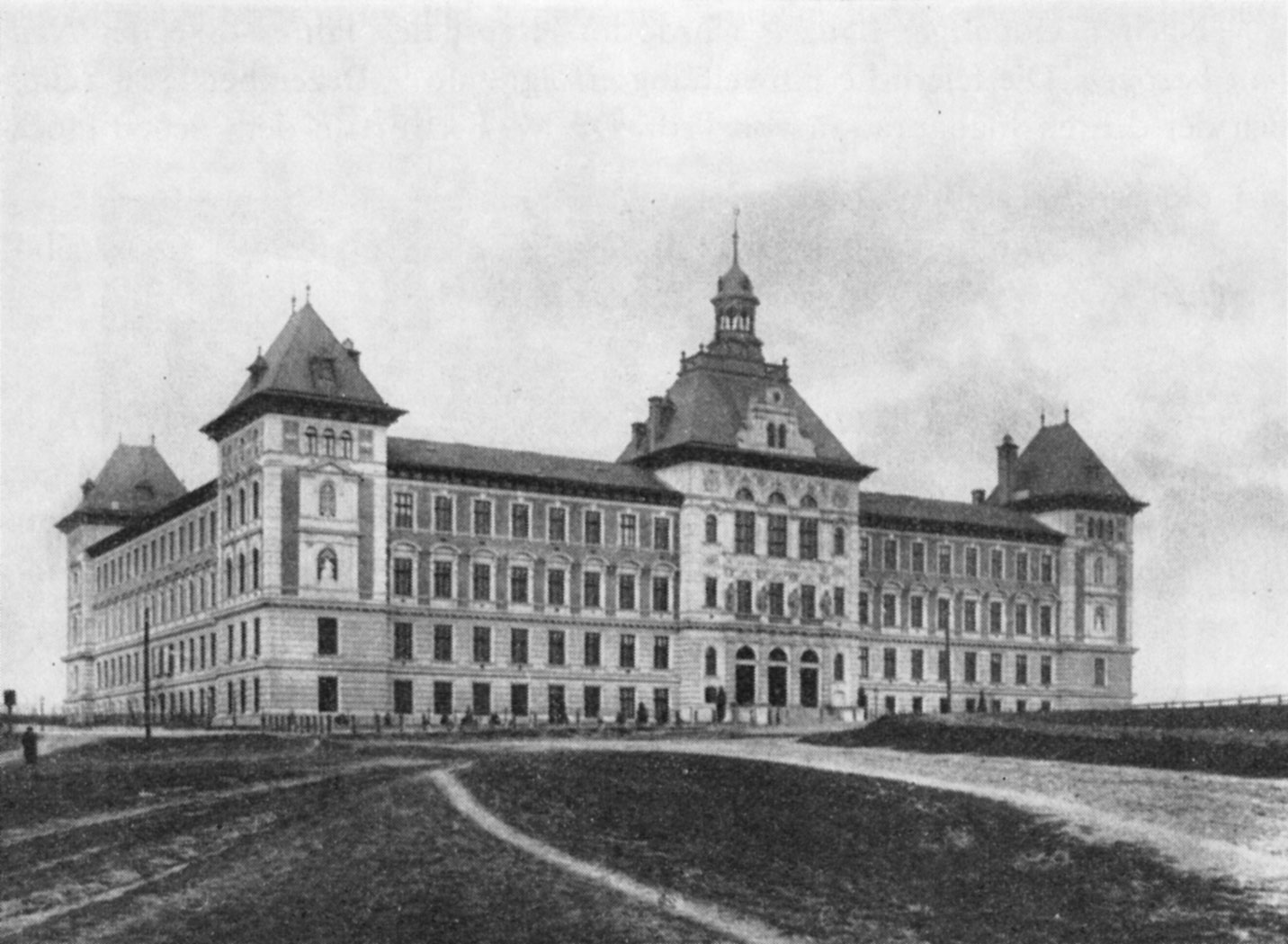
Hochschule für Bodenkultur, today's Gregor-Mendel-Haus (1896)

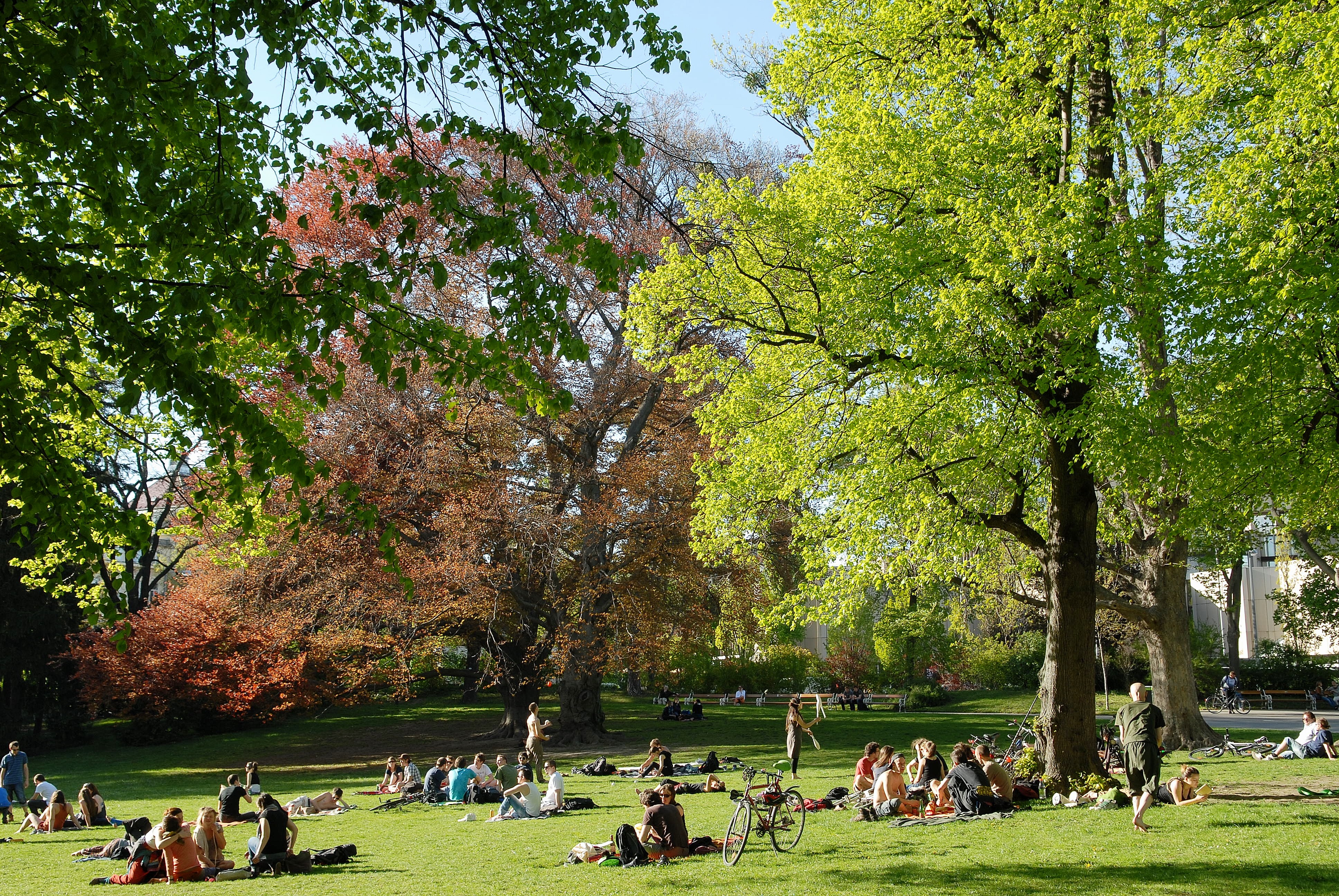
Türkenschanzpark (original campus)

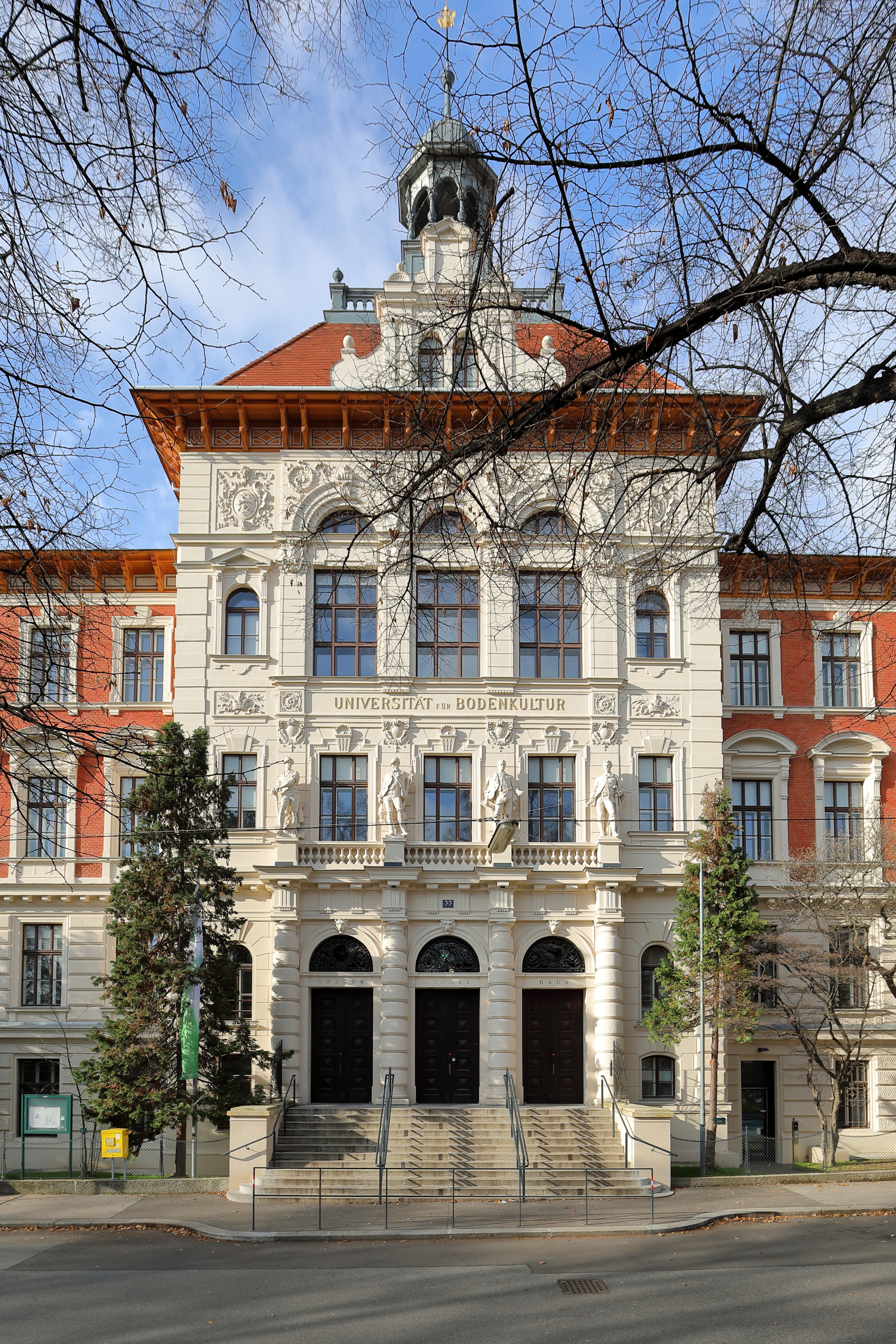
Gregor-Mendel-Haus (original campus)

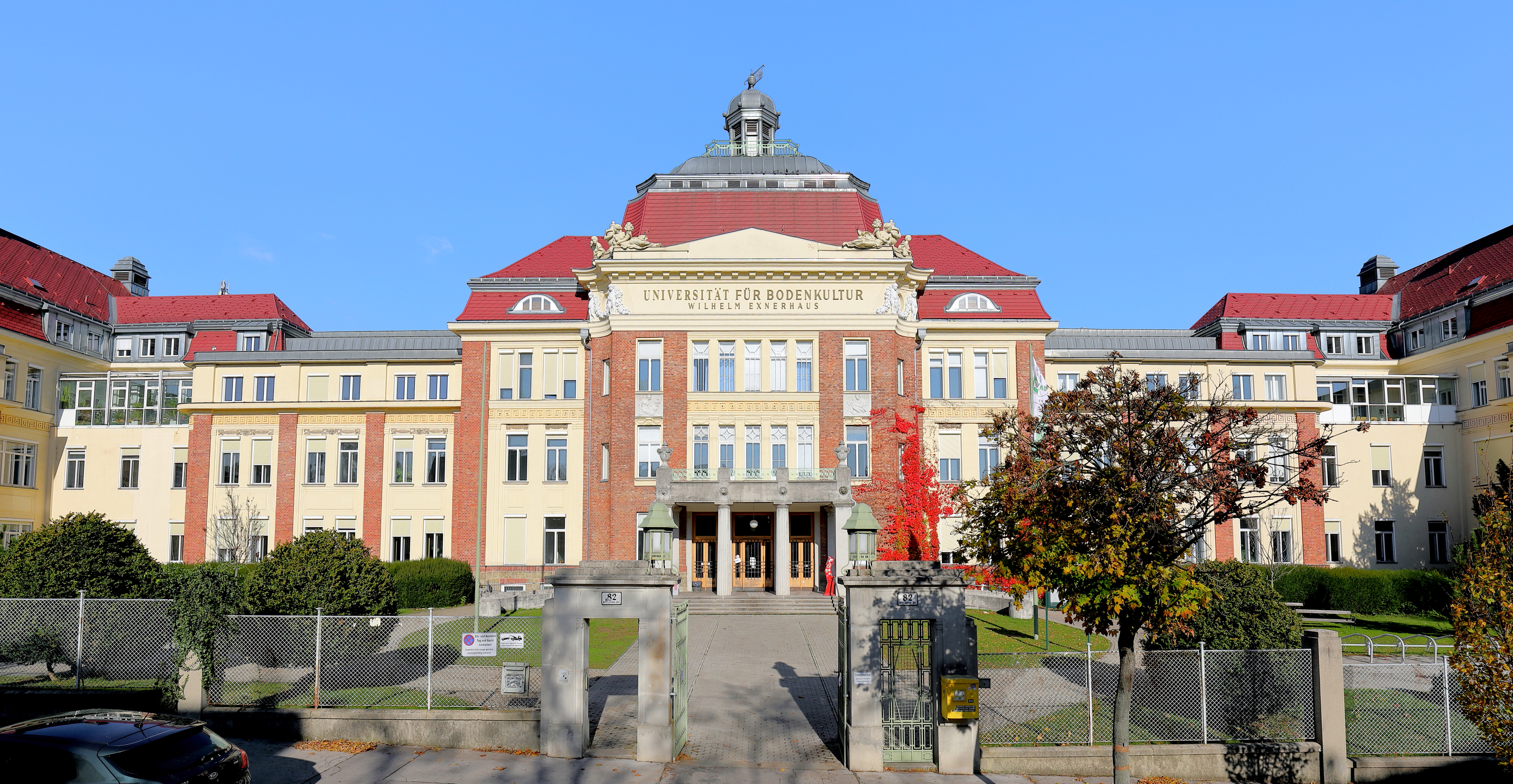
Wilhelm-Exner-Haus (original campus)

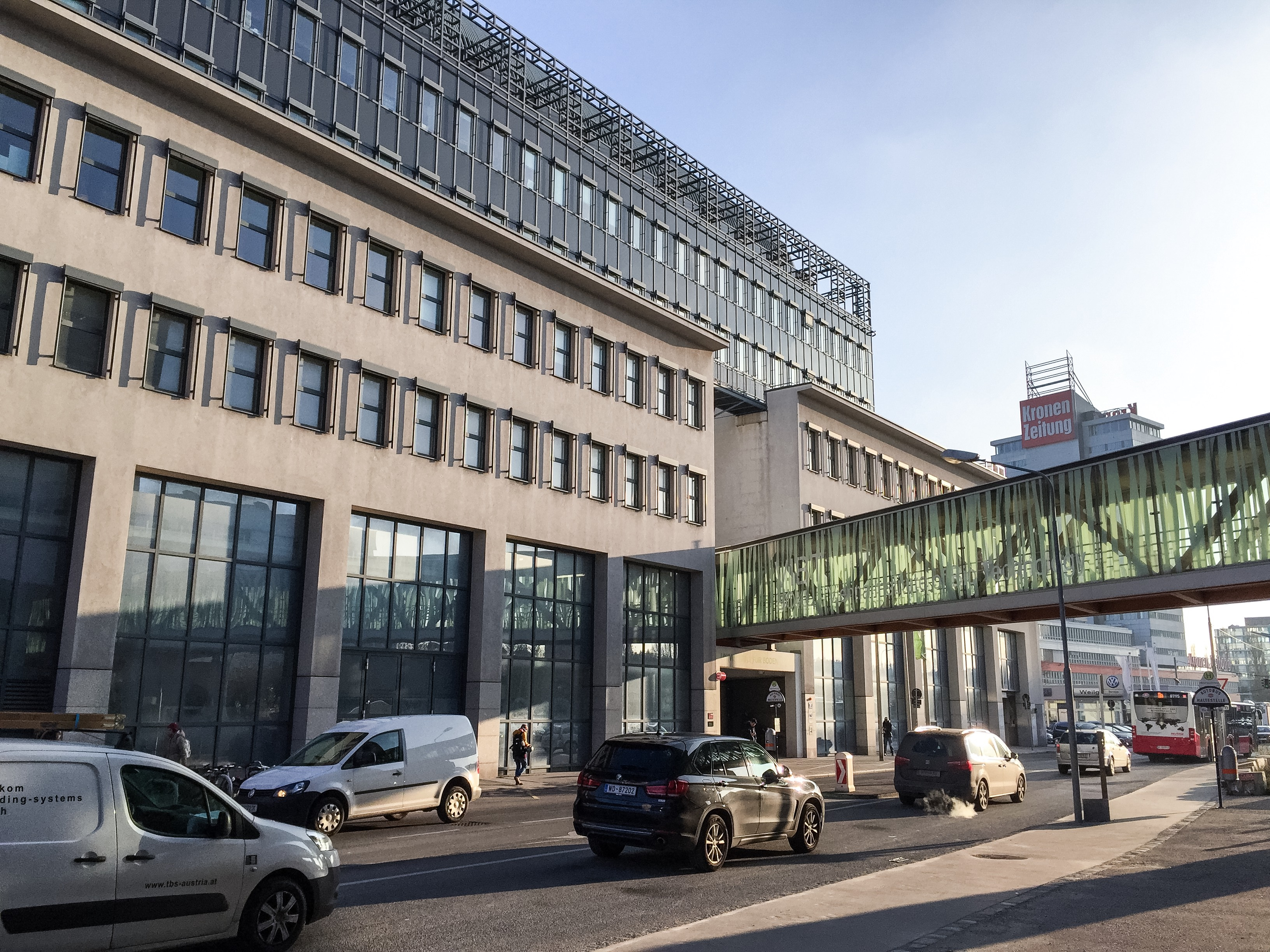
Armin-Szilvinyi-Haus (Muthgasse campus)

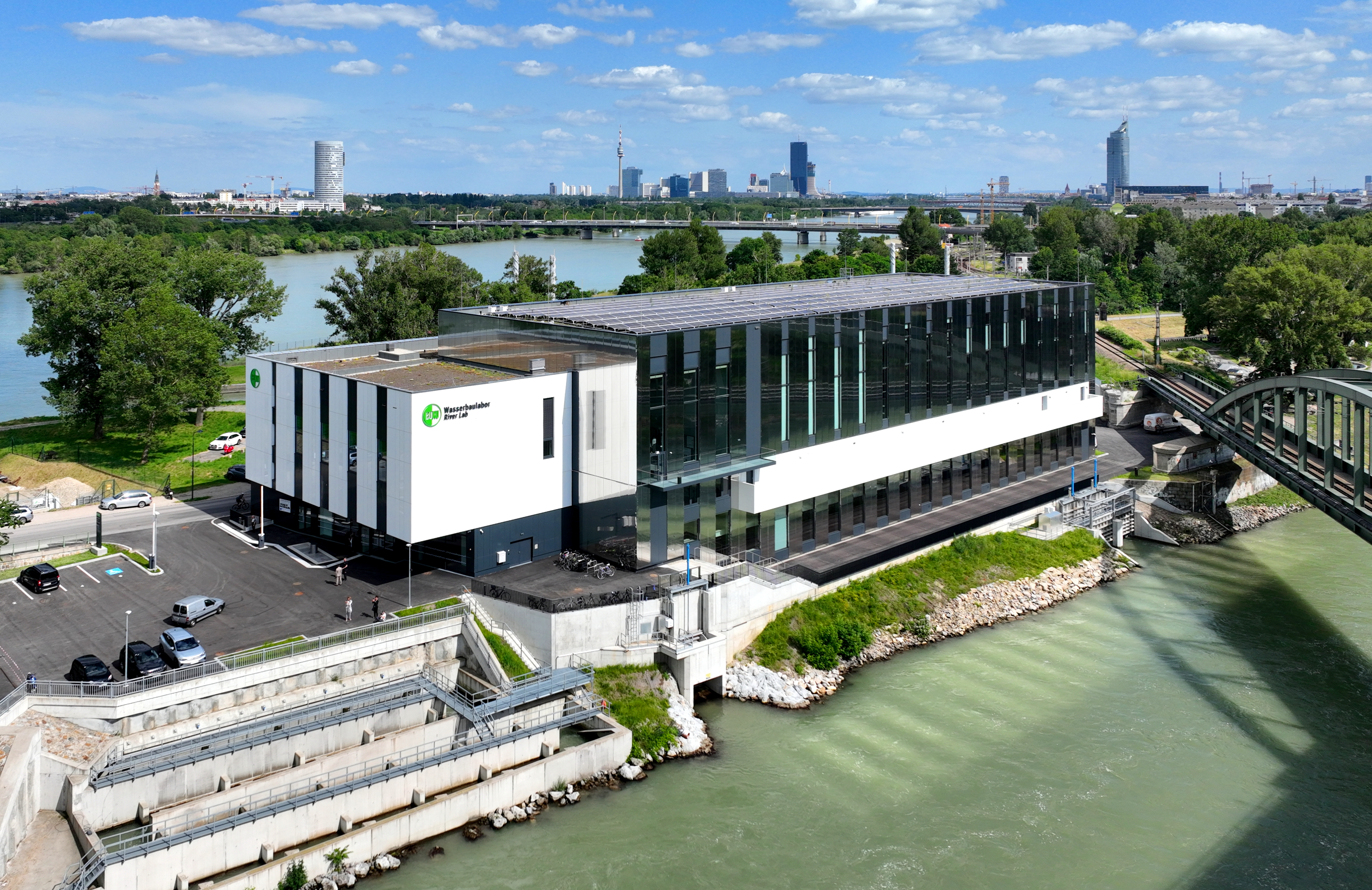
New River Laboratory

== Departments and Research Units ==
15 Departments of BOKU

- Department of Material Sciences and Process Engineering
- Department of Biotechnology
- Department of Water, Atmosphere and Environment
- Department of Nanobiotechnology
- Department of Chemistry
- Department of Integrative Biology and Biodiversity Research
- Department of Food science and Technology
- Department of Landscape, Spatial and Infrastructure Sciences
- Department of Economics and Social Sciences
- Department of Sustainable Agricultural Systems
- Department of Civil Engineering and Natural Hazards
- Department of Forest- and Soil Sciences
- Department of Crop Sciences
- Department of Agrobiotechnology, IFA-Tulln
- Department of Applied Genetics and Cell Biology

Research Units and Initiatives

- Center for Agricultural Sciences
- Center for Bioeconomy
- Center for Global Change and Sustainability

== Studies ==
BOKU offers 8 BSc programmes and 28 MSc programmes. Most of them allow various specialisations and possibilities for majors. The language of instruction is partly German, partly English. For many MSc programmes the language of instruction is English only. In general, programmes start each year in October and take three years for a BSc diploma with 180 ECTS credits and two years for a MSc diploma with 120 ECTS credits. Studies are in the field of natural resources management, life sciences & biotechnology, civil & environmental engineering, landscape planning, agriculture, forestry and winemaking.

The PhD programme is a three-year programme with 180 ECTS credits which consists of a research component (conducting research under supervision and writing a thesis) and a smaller education component. In order to guarantee adequate supervision, the research subject must fit the research programme of BOKU and its institutes.

Due to BOKU's extensive world-wide engagement, the university offers many international MSc programmes as joint or double degree. It is also a member of the Euroleague for Life Sciences university network, partnering with University of Copenhagen, Faculty of Science (SCIENCE), Swedish University of Agricultural Sciences (SLU), Czech University of Life Sciences Prague (CULS), University of Hohenheim (UHOH), Warsaw University of Life Sciences (WULS-SGGW), Wageningen University and Research Centre (WUR), China Agricultural University (CAU), Hebrew University of Jerusalem, Robert H. Smith Faculty of Agriculture, Food and Environment (HUJI), Lincoln University, New Zealand (LU) and Cornell University, College of Agriculture and Life Sciences (CALS).

== Notable alumni ==
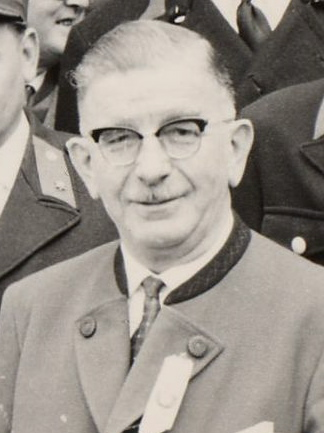
Leopold Figl (1902–1965)

- Leopold Figl – Federal Chancellor of Austria (1945–1953)
- Franz Fischler – EU Commissioner for Agriculture, Rural Development and Fisheries (1995–2004)
- Nikolaus Berlakovich – Federal Minister of Agriculture and Forestry (2008–2013)
- Luis Durnwalder – Governor of South Tyrol (1989–2014)
- Günter Haiden – Federal Minister of Agriculture and Forestry (1976–1986)
- Sabine Herlitschka – CEO of Infineon Technologies Austria (2014–present)
- Sixtus Lanner – Austrian MP (1934–2022)
- Hans Lechner – Governor of the State of Salzburg (1961–1977)
- Hermann Neubacher – Mayor of Vienna (1938–1940)
- Erwin Pröll – Governor of Lower Austria (1992–2017)
- Josef Pröll – Federal Minister of Finance and Vice-Chancellor (2008–2011)
- Dragutin Radimir – Forestry Engineer (1889-1983)
- Hans Tuppy – Biochemist and Federal Minister of Science (1987–1989)
- Oskar Weihs – Federal Minister of Agriculture and Forestry (1970–1976)
- Andrä Rupprechter – Federal Minister of Agriculture and Forestry (2013–2017)

== Notable scientists ==
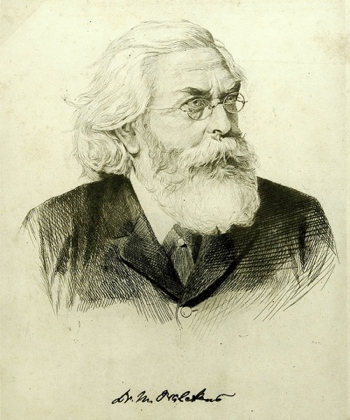
Martin Wilckens (1834–1897)

- Walter Bitterlich - Forest Scientist and Inventor
- Adolf Cieslar - Forest Scientist
- Adolf Ritter von Guttenberg - Forest Scientist
- Herbert Killian - Forest Historian
- Josef Kisser - Botanist
- Helga Kromp-Kolb – Meteorologist und Climate Scientist, Austrian Scientist of the Year 2005
- Wilhelm Neurath - Economist
- Emil Perels - Land Planner
- Karl Prachar - Mathematician
- Karl E. Schedl - Zoologist and Forest Scientist
- Franz Schwackhöfer - Chemist
- Erich von Tschermak-Seysenegg - Plant researcher
- Martin Wilckens - Animal researcher and Founding Rector of BOKU
