= Sabine Herlitschka =

Austrian business executive

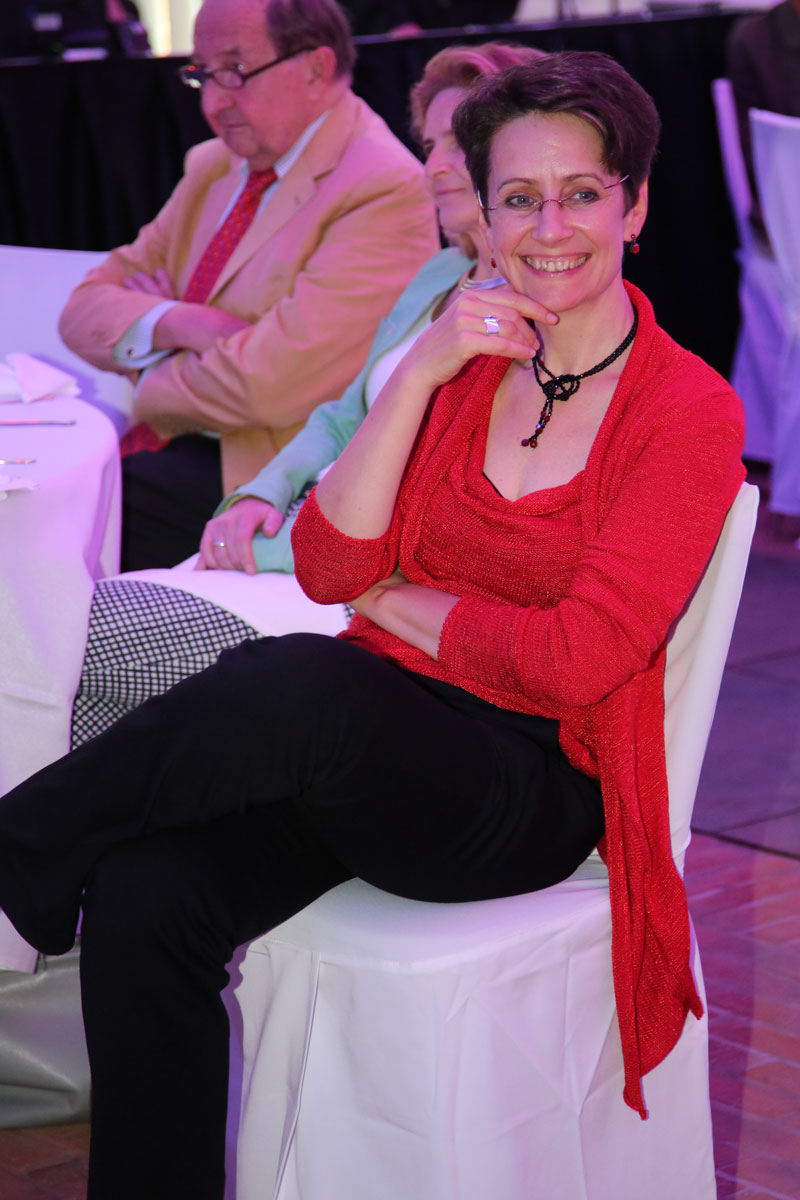
- Herlitschka in 2014
- Born: 1 February 1966 (age 60); Pfarrkirchen, Germany
- Education: University of Natural Resources and Life Sciences (BOKU), Vienna
- Employer: Infineon Technologies Austria

Sabine Herlitschka is the chief executive officer (CEO) of Infineon Technologies Austria, a group subsidiary of Infineon Technologies AG.

== Early life and education ==
Sabine Herlitschka was born on February 1, 1966, in Pfarrkirchen, Germany, and grew up in Salzburg, Austria. She studied Food Technologies and Biotechnology at the University of Natural Resources and Life Sciences (BOKU), Vienna. She pursued her doctoral studies, followed by post-doctoral work, in industry, at Immuno AG. Her doctorate was awarded by the University of Natural Resources and Life Sciences (BOKU), Vienna. She holds an MBA in general management.

== Career ==
In 1996 Herlitschka joined the Bureau for International Research and Technology Cooperation (BIT) as Head of Unit and then Deputy Director. In 2003 she became Vice Rector for Research Management and International Cooperation at the Medical University of Graz. Thereafter, she became Director of the Division of European and International Programs at the Austrian Research Promotion Agency (FFT) in Vienna in 2006. In 2010 she spent time in the US as a Fulbright Scholar at George Washington University and the Johns Hopkins University School of Advanced International Studies in Washington, DC.

Herlitschka joined Infineon Austria Technologies AG in 2011 as a Member of the Management Board, followed by the position as chief technology officer (CTO) in 2012, and finally its chief executive officer (CEO) in April 2014.

She is a member of the Austrian Council for Research and Technology Development and of the Styrian Research Council. She joined the senate of the Fraunhofer-Gesellschaft on 1 January 2016. She serves on the executive board of the Ludwig Boltzmann Gesellschaft. She is also a member of the European Commission's Horizon 2020 high-level strategy group on industrial technologies and represents Infineon Technologies Austria on the European Commission's CONNECT advisory forum for Research and Innovation in ICT in Horizon 2020. She was a member of the high level expert group for the ex‐post‐evaluation of the 7th EU Framework Programme (2007‐2013).

She currently is the chairperson of the ECSEL Joint Undertaking, succeeding Andrea Cuomo from STMicroelectronics. She will serve in this post from 15 February 2018 until 14 February 2019.

== Other activities ==
- Fraunhofer Society, Member of the Senate
- TU Wien, Member of the Council

== Awards and honours ==
Herlitschka received the French Republic's "Chevalier dans l’Ordre du Mérite" medal (the French National Order of Merit) in honor of services to the strategic research partnership between France and Austria in October 2011.

Herlitschka is an honorary senator of the University of Natural Resources and Life Sciences (BOKU), Vienna. She won the Austrian University Management Award 2007 together with Caroline Auer for their work at the Medical University of Graz.

She was nominated as Austrian of the year in 2014 in the category "family and career".

In 2016 she was named Carinthian manager of the year. She was named most important woman of the year in 2017 and was ranked 10th in their Top-1000-Manager list by the Austrian "Industrie Magazin".
