= Paul Wijnberg =

Paul Alexander Wijnberg
- Born: 19 December 1934
- Died: 2 July 2013 (aged 78); Somerset West
- Children: Mike, Allan, John and Simon
- Military career
- Allegiance: Republic of South Africa; Republic of South Africa
- Branch: South African Navy
- Service years: c. 1958–1998
- Rank: Rear Admiral
- Commands: FOC Naval Command East; SAS President Kruger (F150)
- Awards: Pro Patria Medal Unitas (Unity) Medal Good Service Medal National Order of Merit

Paul Alexander Wijnberg (born 19 December 1934 – 2 July 2013) was a senior South African naval officer.

== Early life ==
He was schooled at Maritzburg College,

After joining the Navy he was sent in 1958 to HMS Excellent to attend the Royal Naval Long Gunnery Officers’ Course. When he returned to South Africa he was appointed Officer Commanding SAN Gunnery School.

He married Mary Wijnberg and had Mike, Allan, John and Simon Wijnberg

In 1973 he was posted to France as Naval Attaché, for which he was awarded the Ordre Nationale de Mérite.

He commanded the frigate SAS President Kruger (F150) and in 1976 took part in the US Bicentennial Celebrations.

He was appointed Flag Officer Naval Command East and promoted to the rank of Rear Admiral.

He retired in 1998 to a farm in Grabouw where he died on 2 July 2013.

== Awards and decorations ==
- Southern Cross Medal (1952) (SM)
- Military Merit Medal (MMM)
- Pro Patria Medal
- Unitas (Unity) Medal
- Good Service Medal (Gold (30 Years))
- Good Service Medal (Silver (20 Years))
- Good Service Medal (Bronze (10 Years))
- Commander National Order of Merit (France)

Diplomatic posts
Unknown	SA Naval Attaché to France; 1973–Unknown	Unknown
Military offices
New title	Flag Officer Commanding NAVCOM East; Unknown–Unknown	Succeeded by Paul Viljoen
Unknown	Flag Officer Commanding SAS President Kruger (F150); Unknown–Unknown	Unknown
