= Free Radical Research =

- Discipline: Cell/Molecular Biology
- Language: English
- Edited by: Michael Davies, Helmut Sies

Publication details
- Former name: Free Radical Research Communications
- History: First published 1985
- Publisher: Informa Healthcare (UK)
- Frequency: Monthly
- Open access: no

Standard abbreviations
- ISO 4: Free Radic. Res.

Indexing
- ISSN: 1071-5762 (print); 1029-2470 (web)

Links
- Journal homepage

Free Radical Research, formerly Free Radical Research Communications, is an academic journal that publishes research papers, hypotheses, and reviews on free radicals, redox signaling, antioxidants, and oxidative damage. It is published by Informa Healthcare.

== Core Therapeutic Areas ==
- Free radicals and other reactive species in biological, clinical, environmental and other systems
- Antioxidants, including diet-derived antioxidants and other relevant aspects of human nutrition
- Oxidative damage, mechanisms and measurement
- Redox signaling

== Editors-in-Chief ==
Michael Davies and Helmut Sies are the Editors-in-Chief of Free Radical Research.

== Publication Format ==
Free Radical Research publishes 12 issues per year in simultaneous print and online editions.
