= Kelvin Davies =

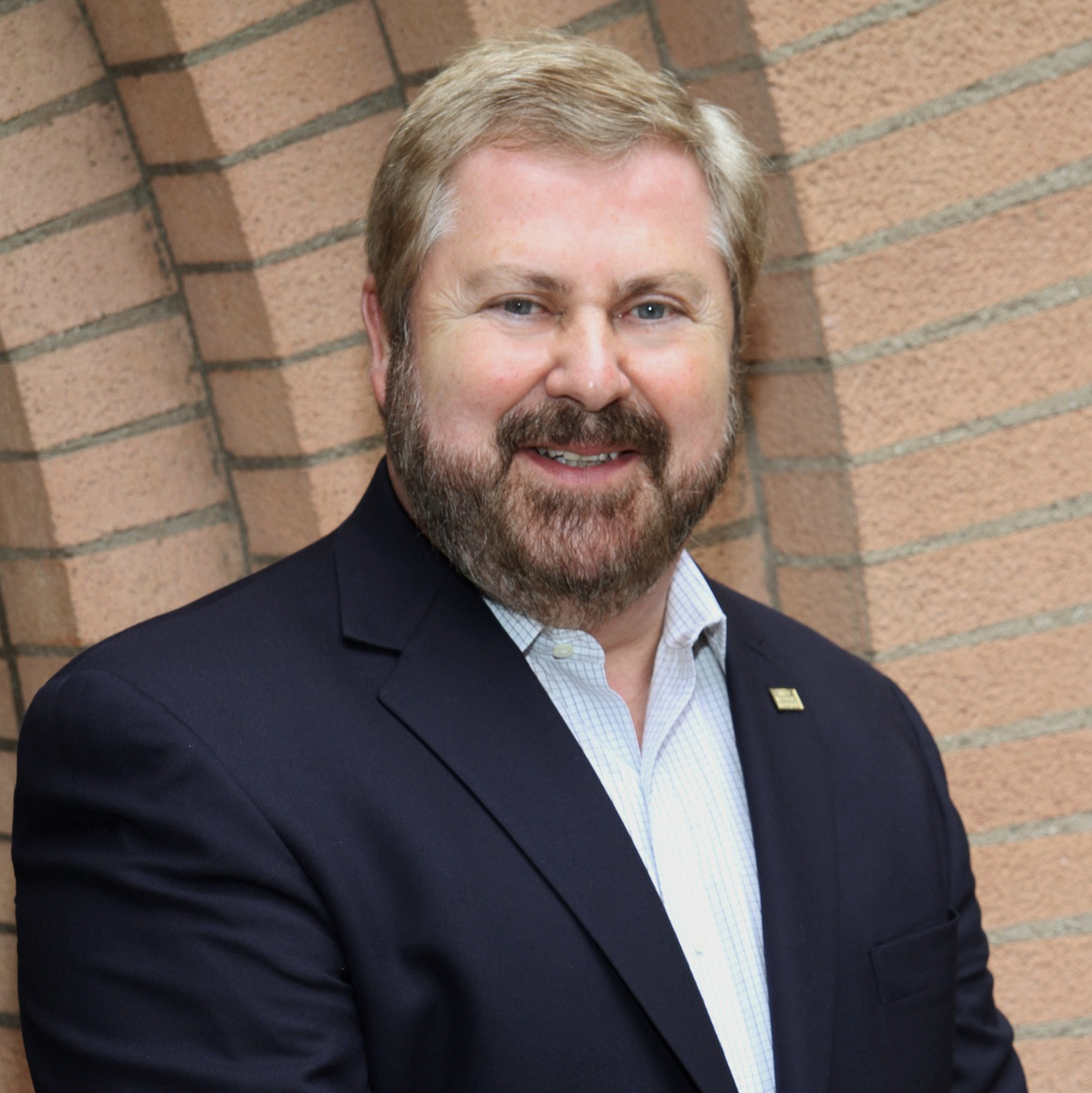
Kelvin J.A. Davies

Kelvin James Anthony Davies is Distinguished Professor Emeritus of Gerontology, Molecular & Computational Biology, and Biochemistry & Molecular Medicine at the University of Southern California. Prior to his retirement in 2023, he was the James E. Birren Chair of Gerontology at the USC Davis School of Gerontology with a joint appointment in Dana and David Dornsife College of Letters, Arts and Sciences in biology. He is involved in researching free radical biology, oxidative stress, and aging; and was an early member of the study of protein oxidation, proteolysis, and altered gene expression during stress-adaptation; he also found the role of free radicals in mitochondrial adaptation to exercise, and demonstrated the role of diminished oxidative stress-adaptive gene expression in aging.

== Biography ==
Educated at the University of London, the University of Wisconsin, and the University of California at Berkeley, he was previously a faculty member at Harvard University and Harvard Medical School. Before moving to USC's Andrus Gerontology Center in 1996, Davies was chairman of the Department of Biochemistry & Molecular Biology at the Albany Medical College, where he was also professor of Molecular Medicine.

== Career ==
Involved in research into oxidative stress and free radicals, Davies is the founding editor-in-chief of the scientific journal, Free Radical Biology & Medicine, and president of the International Society for Free Radical Research. He is also a Fellow of the Society for Free Radical Biology & Medicine; a Fellow of The Gerontological Society of America; a Fellow of the American Association for the Advancement of Science; and winner of the Harwood S. Belding award of the American Physiological Society, as well as the Biennial Award from the European Society for Free Radical Research.

Davies' research focuses on the genes that repair oxidatively damaged proteins, lipids, RNA, and DNA, and his laboratory has made notable contributions to the understanding of this subject over the past twenty years. Davies is currently focusing his research on the regulation of oxidative stress repair genes during aging.

In 2012, by order of French president Nicolas Sarkozy, Davies was awarded a French knighthood when he and fellow USC professor Enrique Cadenas, M.D., Ph.D. were named chevaliers of l'Ordre National du Mérite.
