= Aditya Surpal =

Indian businessman

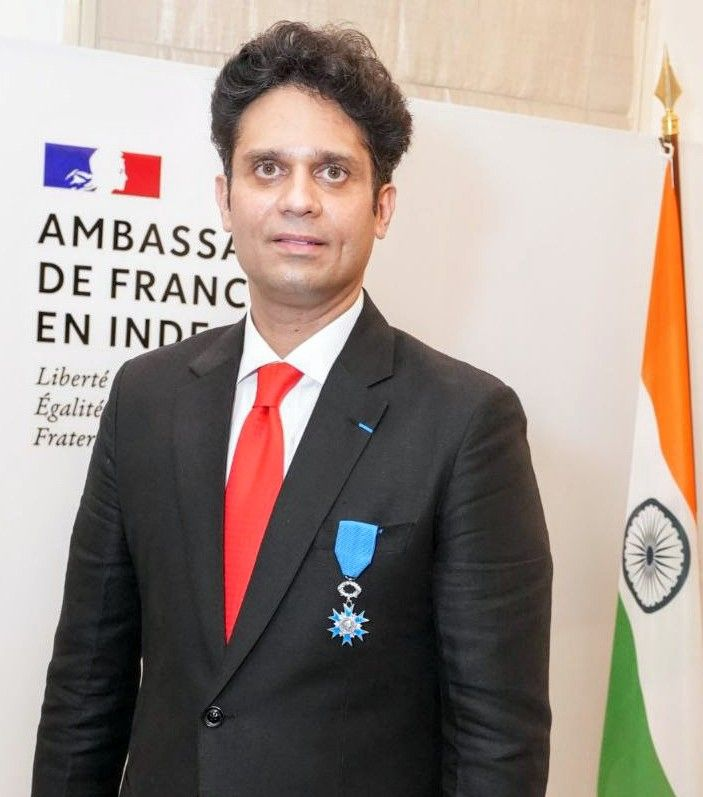
- Born: 16 March 1982 (age 44); Ludhiana, India
- Education: Cardiff University
- Occupation: Director of Surpal Group
- Awards: Chevalier Ordre national du Mérite

Aditya Surpal (born 16 March 1982) is an Indian businessman, and Director of Surpal Group. In 2023 he was awarded Knight Ordre national du Mérite for contribution to developing Indo-French cooperation in the field of education.

== Early life and education ==
Surpal was born in Ludhiana. He is a son of Anil Surpal, the founder of Surpal Cycles. He did his schooling from Modern School New Delhi. And then completed his BSc in Business Administration from Cardiff UniversityHe attended an executive program in Marketing Management from Harvard University.

In 2020, he founded Baby Doux and Au Grand Air, India's first trench kindergarten school in alliance with Agency for French Education Abroad in New Delhi and Gurugram.

== Personal life ==
Aditya Surpal is currently married to Sanjeevani Surpal.

== Awards ==
- In 2022 Honorary Consul of Hungary.
- In 2023 Officer of the National Order of Merit by the Minister of State Chrysoula Zacharopoulou.
