= 3rd Infantry Division (South Africa) =

3rd South African Infantry Division
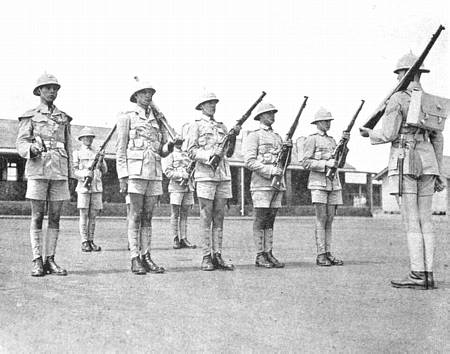
- South African infantry on parade prior to the Union of South Africa's entry into World War II
- Active: 23 October 1940 – 17 May 1943
- Disbanded: 4 April 1942 (re-designated as 3rd Arm Div)
- Country: South Africa
- Allegiance: Allied forces of World War II
- Branch: South African Army
- Type: Infantry
- Size: Division
- Garrison/HQ: Pretoria and later Ermelo

Commanders
- Until re-designation as 3rd Arm Div: Major General Hermanus Botha

Insignia
- Identification symbol

The South African 3rd Infantry Division was an infantry division of the South African Army during World War II.

== History ==
This division was formed in South Africa on 23 October 1940 with its headquarters in Pretoria.

The 3rd Infantry Division as a whole did not go into combat, but its 7th Motorized brigade group participated in the 1942 Invasion of Madagascar. The division organised and trained the South African home defence forces, performed garrison duties and trained and supplied replacements for the 1st and 2nd Divisions deployed to East Africa and later to the Western Desert.

The division was based in Pretoria until 1942, whereafter the division then moved to Ermelo in the Eastern Transvaal, although its constituent units were deployed as far as the then South West Africa.

On 4 April 1942 the division was redesignated the South African 3rd Armoured Division. This division was disbanded on 17 May 1943, without ever having been deployed. However, one of the division's constituent units, the 7th Motorised Brigade, did take part in the invasion of Madagascar.

Major General Hermanus Botha was the commander of the division from 23 August 1940 until its redesignation.

== Order of battle ==
On formation in October 1940, the Division was structured as follows:

- Division Troops
  - 6th Light Field Brigade, SAA
  - 8th, 9th, 10th Field Companies, SAEC?
  - 17th Divisional Field Park Company, SAEC?
- 7th South African Infantry Brigade (Raised 11 July 1940 at Premier Mine)
  - 1st Pretoria Regiment
  - 1st Witwatersrand Rifles
  - Regiment de la Rey
- 8th South African Infantry Brigade (Raised 1 July 1940 in East London. Disbanded November 1940.)
  - The Cape Town Highlanders
  - Prince Alfred's Guard
  - The First City Regiment
- 9th South African Infantry Brigade (Raised 15 July 1940 at Premier Mine)
  - Regiment President Steyn (Until 22 Nov 40)
  - Die Middelandse Regiment
  - Regiment Westelike Provinsie (Until 1 Sep 40)
  - 2nd Pretoria Regiment (From Sep - Oct 40)
  - 2nd Transvaal Scottish (From 4 Sep - 21 Nov 40)
  - 2nd Royal Natal Carbineers (From 9 Sep - 3 Oct 40)
  - 1st Regiment Botha (From Sep - Nov 40)
  - 1st Pretoria Highlanders (From Nov 40)
  - The Cape Town Highlanders (From 6 Nov 40)
  - 2nd Natal Mounted Rifles (From 23 Nov 40)
- 10th South African Infantry Brigade (Raised July 1940. Replaced 8th Bde in Nov 40.)
  - The Kimberley Regiment
  - 2nd Witwatersrand Rifles
  - The First City Regiment
- 11th South African Infantry Brigade (Raised July 1940. Disbanded October 1940.)
  - 2nd Witwatersrand Rifles
  - 1st South-West African Infantry Battalion
  - 2nd Imperial Light Horse
- 12th South African Infantry Brigade (Raised July 1940. Disbanded September 1940.)
  - 2nd Royal Natal Carbineers
  - 2nd Pretoria Regiment
  - 2nd Rand Light Infantry
