= Operation Jane =

Operation Jane may refer to:

- Operation Jane, the amphibious landing at Tamatave during the Battle of Madagascar in 1942
- a 2021 operation by Anonymous (hacker group), directed against the Texas Heartbeat Act
