= 7th South African Infantry Brigade =

7th South African Infantry Brigade 7th South African Motorised Brigade
- Active: 1940–1943
- Country: South Africa
- Allegiance: South Africa
- Type: Brigade

Commanders
- Notable commanders: Brigadier George Thomas Senescall

The 7th South African Infantry Brigade was an infantry brigade of the army of the Union of South Africa during World War II.
The Brigade formed part of the South African 3rd Infantry Division and only saw action in the Battle of Madagascar (June–November 1942). After this operation, it remained in South Africa until it was disbanded on 17 May 1943.

== History ==
The Brigade was formed on 17 June 1940 at Premier Mine. It was part of the 3rd South African Infantry Division and remained stationed in South Africa until June 1942.

It was then sent, as the 7th Motorised Brigade and under command of Brigadier George Thomas Senescall, to Madagascar to help prevent a Japanese occupation of the island, which was under control of Vichy France. The task of the Brigade was to prepare to defend Diego Suarez against a Japanese landing or a counter-attack by Vichy French forces on the island.
By September, the initial fear of Japanese omnipotence had eventually abated and the 7th Brigade was moved south to help break the stubborn resistance of the remaining Vichy French forces. On 29 September, two companies of the South African Pretoria Highlanders performed the only amphibious landing by South African forces of the entire war, at the west coast harbor town of Tulear. On 6 November 1942, the French commander Armand Annet capitulated.

On 7 December, the 7th Brigade returned to South Africa and became again part of the 3rd Infantry Division. It was disbanded on 17 May 1943.

== Order of battle ==
Order of Battle during the Battle of Madagascar

- 1st City Regiment (Grahamstown)
- Pretoria Regiment
- Pretoria Highlanders
- 1st SA Armoured Car Commando
- 6th Field Regiment SA Artillery
- 88th Field Company SA Engineers

== Bibliography ==
- Phillips, Russell (2021). A Strange Campaign: The Battle for Madagascar. Shilka Publishing. p. 93. ISBN 978-1912680276.
