= Pretoria Armour Regiment =

Pretoria Regiment Pretoria Armour Regiment
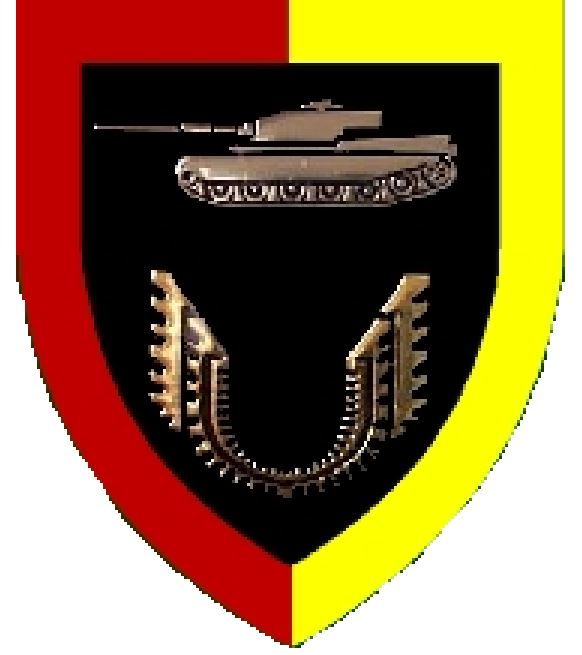
- SANDF Pretoria Regiment emblem
- Active: 1 July 1913 – present
- Country: South Africa
- Allegiance: Republic of South Africa; Republic of South Africa
- Branch: South African Army; South African Army
- Type: Armoured Regiment
- Part of: South African Armoured Formation; Army Conventional Reserve
- Garrison/HQ: Magazine Hill, Patriot Street, Salvo Kop, Pretoria
- Motto: Nulli Secundus ("Second to None")
- Equipment: Stuart light tank (retired); Sherman tank (retired); Eland Mk7 (retired); Ratel; Olifant

Commanders
- Acting Commanding Officer: Maj. H.J.W. Stander (2026 – Current)

Insignia
- Beret Colour: Black
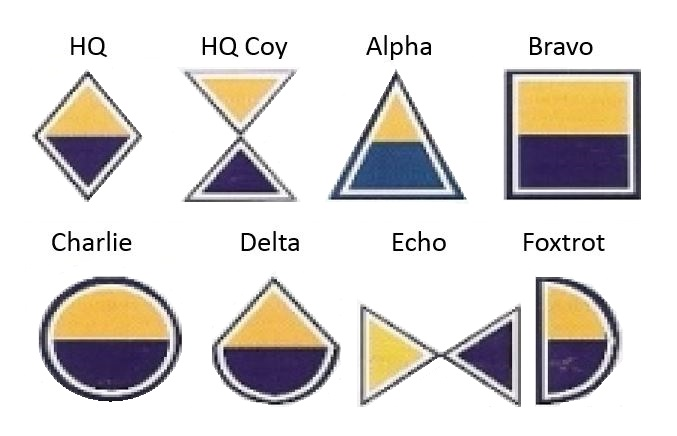
- Armour Squadron emblems

- Armour beret bar circa 1992
- Abbreviation: PAR

The Pretoria Armour Regiment (formerly the Pretoria Regiment) is a reserve armoured regiment of the South African Army.

== History ==
=== Origin ===
The Pretoria Regiment was formed on 1 July 1913 as the 12th Infantry Battalion (The Pretoria Regiment) – a unit of the Active Citizen Force – by the amalgamation of several units: the Pretoria Company of the Transvaal Scottish, the Central South African Railway Volunteers, the Northern Mounted Rifles and the Pretoria detachment of the Transvaal Cycle and Motor Corps. The Regiment began as an Infantry Bn and served the UDF in this capacity for 30 years from 1913 to 1943.In 1943, the PR converted to Armour at the RAC depots in Egypt - for the Italian Campaign, as part of the 6 SA Armoured Division - and has served the UDF, the SADF and the SANDF in both these capacities since then.

=== World War One ===
In August 1914, at the request of the British government, the South African government declared War on Austria, Germany and their allies and mobilized the one-year-old Union Defense Force to invade German South West Africa (Namibia). The new PR recruited volunteers who shipped from Cape Town to Luderitzbucht. Instead of fighting they had to lay new railway lines for rolling stock to use the line from the coast inland. Their only contact with the enemy was being bombed by two German aircraft, costing the PR 16 wounded and one killed. Then they marched 140km from Swakopmund to Usakos. From Usakos the officers and 609 other ranks- including 44 black drivers for 148 mules and eleven horses- marched under the harsh sun, in clouds of choking dust, in pursuit of the German Forces north-ward - 410 km in twelve days; 130 km in the last four. From Usakos they were on half rations, on one and galf army biscuits per day. Colonel JG Jeffer once related that the PR's motto was first heard in Damaraland, when the brigade commander said to a parade "If your motta is not 'second to none' it should be". When they arrived at Otavifontein surrender the negotiations had already begun. On the 9th July 1915, the German commander surrendered 4740 men and 37 field guns. The campaign involved 100783 South African volunteers, mostly Active Citizen Force and Commandos with 33546 Black drivers and labourers. Many PR men then volunteered to serve in Europe, the Middle East and East Africa where the War dragged on. For financial and political reasons the South Africans all served in British Army War Service Unites each named 'South Africa' but not Union Defense Force. In German East Africa where 60322 men served (16845 Black) the PR's former Adjutant, Joe Freeth, earned the Distinguished Service Order commanding the 7th SA Infantry Regiment at the Battle of Kitove near Mount Kilimanjaro. Lt Gen Jan Smuts wrote "...the battle of Kitove was a repetition of Spioenkop ... It was a joyful victory and three Transvalers are to be decorated ... (including) ... Freeth of Pretoria ..." The 7th SA Infantry Regiment included from the PR as CO, LtCol JC Freeth, LT Frans Roos (later CO of the PR), and Corporal WP Cooper later RSM of the PR. A total of 57755 South African volunteers went to France, Belgium, Egypt and Palestine including 30934 black and coloured support troops and the Cape Corps Infantry Battalion who fought gallantly and successfully in Tanganyika and against Turkish forces until 1918' earning seven battle honours. Some from PR joined the 3rd South African Infantry and went to France. James Leisk, the first Honory Colonel of PR, served in GSWA on Gen Louis Both's staff and then went on to Egypt and France becoming Brigade Major in the 1st SA Infantry Brigade and earning the French Croix de Guerre. The 1st SA Infantry Brigade was destroyed four times in France - at Dellville Wood, at Butte de Warlencourt, at Marrieres Wood and Arras - and then again at Ypres in Belgium. Many PR men were decorated serving elsewhere - such as Captain FK TeWater, MC, the former PR Medical Officer. The PR's post-War Adjutant, Captain LW Tomlinson, was in 'D' Company, 3rd SA Infantry, and earned the Distinguished Service Order for leadeing an attack on a German position on the north-eastern edge of Delvill Wood, capturing 138 prisoners before being wounded. He commanded 'D' Company at Ypres in 1917 and in November 1917 commanded the 3rd SAI. When the Battalion was disbanded he was commanding a company in 4th SAI in October 1918, earning the Croix de Guerre. All cast reflected glory on their old Regiment by following the path of duty where it led. A total of 245419 South African volunteers served in the War, including 30934 Black and Coloured troops, and 1925 Coloured infantry. Casualties numbered 18642 of whom 12000 were wounded. The entire war cost the government 31450000 pounds. The ACF was dormant during and after the War. Only in 1922, when the white gold miners on the Rand organized commandos and tried to establish what they called 'a socialist republic did the ACF really become active again. 12th Infantry Battalion (PR) was called and within days there were 1000 volunteers ready with WO1 WP Cooper as RSM. Capt Tomlinson led a company into action to clear the Pretoria-Germiston railway line near Rietfontein Station.

=== Rand Revolt ===
The regiment prevented a force of armed strikers from damaging the Pretoria-Germiston Railway line in May 1922.

=== Renamed ===
The Regiment founded in 1913 as The XIIth Infantry Battalion ( The Pretoria Regiment) in 1929 it was remanded 'The Pretoria Regiment (Princess Alice's Own) in 1936 the 1st Battalion Pretoria Regiment (Princess Alice's Own) as well as the 2nd Battalion Pretoria Regiment (Princess Alice's Own) in 1941 The Amalgamated Pretoria Regiment ( Princess Alice's Own) in 1946 1 Pretoria Regiment (Princess Alice's own) as well as the 2 Pretoria Regiment (Princess Alice's Own) in 1945 The Amalgamated Pretoria Regiment in 2019 the Regiment was renamed to The Pretoria Armour Regiment

=== The Royal Colonel ===
On 24 October 1930 it was once again renamed, to the Pretoria Regiment (Princess Alice's Own) after Princess Alice, Countess of Athlone. The Regiment became fully bilingual with the addition of a 2nd Battalion staffed predominantly by Afrikaners.

=== World War Two ===
==== The Second World War (1939 – 1945) ====
When War came the UDF was poorly prepared, having only begun re-armament in 1936 as a war with Germany seemed possible. On Parliament’s declaration of war after Germany’s invasion of Poland on 1 September 1939 the permanent Force was only 3353 and the ACF was 14631 Active Citizen Force soldiers, sailors and airmen.

Besides the trained manpower shortage, the UDF’s usual supplier of armaments, Britain, was unable to satisfy her own needs let alone the countries of the Commonwealth. South Africa had to look after herself. Fortunately under the leadership of Dr Hendrik van der Bijl, the famous South African electrical engineer and industrialist, within two years the country had develop her own war industries, making artillery, armoured cars, lorries, tires and all kinds of ammunition and optical gun-sights.

In 1940 fascist Italy entered the War on German side when Holland, Belgium and France surrendered and British and some French forces were evacuated to England in June 1940. Italy attacked Sudan and Kenya and in August 1940 advanced into British Somaliland from the Italian East Africa colonies of Ethiopia, Italian Somaliland and Eritrea – which was seen as the root of potential threats to South Africa. From 1940 the 1st SA Infantry Division fought in Somalia, took part in liberating Abyssinia (Ethiopia) and then in Lybia, together with the 2nd SA Infantry Division captured Bardia and the German Division Bardia of Panzer Gruppe Africa in January 1942. The 1st SA Infantry Division suffered heavy losses at Sidi Rezegh in operation Crusader 1941, but fought successfully at El Alamain in October 1942. However, the 2nd SA Infantry Division surrendered to Gen Erwin Rommel at Tobruk in June 1942, losing two brigades and a number of attached British and Indian soldiers, although some units escaped.

At first the PR’s war was dull. The 1st Battalion’s 364 volunteers were mobilized only on 23 July 1940, the day after the 2nd Battalion. The PR’s departure from Pretoria station was marked by tearful farewells. Families believed the soldiers would be sent into action immediately. However, many of the men were at home that night as their train had taken them only to Premier Mine. They were retrained and as a unit of the 3rd SA Infantry Division (witch never left the country) they began a period of garrison duties, guarding the eastern border since in Pretoria there was a belief that enemy troops might invade through Mozambique. Then they guarded interned German citizens and performed all duties that often make war monotonous. By October, 1940, the 2nd BN was still much under strength and was amalgamated with 1st PR which then was designated simply the Pretoria Regiment (Princess Alice’s Own).

Following the surprise attack by the Japanese on the US Navy at Pearl Harbour, Hawaii, on 7 December 1941, Japanese forces moved into the Indian Ocean early in 1942. To prevent a Japanese landing in Madagascar and perhaps on South Africa’s coast, British forces occupied the island. As a Battalion of the 7th SA Infantry Brigade, the Pretoria Regiment accompanied the British force. The Regiment took part in amphibious landings and some small engagements with the Vichy French garrison of Madagascar. Given the task of organizing the rear-guard if the Japanese landed. The CO, Lt Col CL Engelbrecht, DSO, realistically saw no chance of a rear-guard action. Instead he planned to turn the PR into a guerilla force to fight during a Japanese occupation. The Japanese did not invade and the Pretoria Regiment went home to prepare for its real war.

Converting from Infantry to Tanks the Pretoria Regiment was attached to the new 6th Armoured division and sent to Egypt for full-scale armour training including a divisional to armour exercise in the desert at Khatatba. They then sailed to Italy and were introduced to armour warfare north of Rome, at Bagnoregio, where the first Military Cross was earned by Lt Fred Davey. Eventually, 1200 strong, the PR consisted of five squadrons. One squadron was the reconnaissance-Assault Squadron. As the Reconnaissance Regiment of the 6th Armoured Division early in 1945 the PR needed Infantry for close support. The CO established a Recce Assault Squadron composed of three troops of seven tanks, one for each tank squadron, and a six-tank Mortar Support Troop. They were mounted in turretless Stuart tanks fitted with 2-inch mortars and .30-inch Browing machine-guns. The five infantrymen per tank were armed with Thompson and Sten sub-machine guns and grenades. The squadron made joint armour-infantry operations a reality.

The PR shared in liberating Italy from German occupation during 1944 and 1945, serving as infantry in the snow of the Winter line. At the War’s end Pretoria Regiment added to theatre honours of South West Africa 1914-1915 and Madagascar 1942 the honours of, Italy 1944-1945, Bagno Regio, Sarteano, La Foce, Florence, the Gothic line, Monte Caterelto and Po Valley. After fighting as the tank regiment of the 24th Guards Brigade for six months, the Pretoria Regiment was granted colours in the form of wings behind the PR headdress badge.

By 1945, 406.133 full-time volunteers had served in the Union Defence Force full-time or part-time- whites, the indian and Malay corps (later called the Cape Corps) and Native Military Corps, the Woman’s Services, the SA Air Force and the SA Naval Forces of ninety-five armed trawlers and whale catchers as corvettes and mine sweepers in the South Atlantic and Mediterranean. The SA Air Force numbered 35 squadrons flying 82.401 operational missions in Abyssinia, the Western Desert, Tunisia, Italy, the Balkans and the Romanian oilfields and at sea. To supply the Polish uprising in Warsaw against the German occupation in August 1944, Liberator bombers flew 2500km from Italy in 41 missions. All, even Permanent Force personnel, were enrolled in the Active Citizen Force for the period of the war.

==== After 1945 ====
After the War the PR became two regiments again. Enough men volunteered to bring it up to strength. However, FC Erasmus, Minister of Defence from 1948, had his own ideas about the ACF, By 1958 the PR was a single regiment of only 120 members – and 30 were officers. The PR’s squadron of Stuart tanks for Saturday training was taken away. Camps at Potchefstroom were undertaken with turretless, gun less Sherman tanks. Thanks with turrets and guns were kept for gunnery practice lasting two days on a standing base – barely giving time to develop expertise. Field exercises lasted two or three days. No realism was possible in training.

Apart from the government’s dispatch to Berlin of a transport squadron of the SAAF to participate in the Berlin Airlift and of a fighter bomber squadron to Korea to join the United Nations’ forces in repelling the North Korean invasion of South Korea, the South African world seemed to be at peace. The former Allies drifted into ideological hostility but no war compelled South Africa to fight again.

The more perceptive members of the Defence Force realized, however, that serious problems were not far off. World War 2, emphasizing as it did the values of democracy and humanity, influenced most European colonisers in Asia and Africa to end colonial rule. However, there were armed uprisings in some countries such as the Dutch East Indies (Indonesia), French Indo-China colonies (Vietnam, Laos and Cambodia), Malaya, Algeria and Kenya where there were large European populations. South Africa faced two potential sources of conflict. One was the introduction in 1948 of the ideology of Apartheid which conflicted with the values that had emerged in most of the world as a result of the Second World War. The other was the government’s determination to retain South West Africa, placed under South African guardianship in 1920 but not given permanently by the League of Nations, the predecessor of the United Nations which in 1966 declared the mandate to be at an end. The event of 21 March 1960, at Sharpeville – when 67 people were killed and 180 wounded by panic-stricken, undisciplined police firing wildly into fleeing crowd – influenced attitudes world-wide toward South Africa for the next 40 years.

In the meantime, in March, 1960, shooting in Langa, Cape Town and a mass march on Parliament caused panic in government ranks. A state of emergency was declared and the Defence Force was mobilized to aid the Police. Nearly all the 120 men in the PR reported in within six hours and served five weeks in Operation Duiker as the Defence Headquarters emergency reserve on standby at Waterkloof air base in case of need elsewhere.

In alarm and determined to be seen as firm and resolute, instead of searching for a flexible route to a solution, the government banned the ANC and the PAC. The two movements then decided to resort to armed violence to overthrow the Nationalist Party government. A number left the country to seek training and support abroad especially in the Communist states but their initial attempts were futile and many of their leaders were imprisoned. Eventually, after another generation of young Blacks resorted to a violent solution in 1976, and large numbers left South Africa clandestinely, the country was faced with some decades of township rioting and other violence. However, a situation developed which took the country into several years of internal division and violence.

Eventually, calm returned to the country and the Army was able to continue with armour training. In 1963 there was a full Army HQ exercise at Potchefstroom. To make up a three squadron regiment – one Centurion, one Sherman and one Stuart – the PR and Prince Alfred’s Guard amalgamated. After stiff training they took the field for a week in a brigade field exercise. This was more like it.

The Chief of the Defence Force from 1965 decided to change CF training to the Swedish format. Instead of regimental camps the leader group was called up annually for twelve day training periods and only one squadron was called up for continuous training camps every three years. With the possibility of United Nations’ intervention in SWA the camps were also held at Walvis Bay. For the rest of the time, training was continued on Tuesday evening and Saturdays – made up of lectures, tactical exercises without troops, and musketry practices on the rifle range.

In time, the Swedish pattern of camps. It was also realized that South Africa needed multi-role armed forces and in addition to a counter-insurgency force it required conventional preparation. As result the Army was organized into a Corps headquarters, Divisions and Brigades. In 1974 the Regiment became part of 81 Armoured Brigade. With the new organization the occasional brigade exercises were replaced with annual exercises. The first was held in 1975 as Exercise De Wet 5 at Bloemfontein. As result of Operation Savannah in Angola in 1975-1976 the PR lost an annual camp but though financial restrictions prevented a brigade exercise in 1976, the PR held a 26-day gunnery refresher course at Tempe during which RHQ Troop Sgt, Adam Loock, and the Co’s driver, Cpl CP Nell, were given an orientation course on the newly developed Ratel Infantry Vehicle which replaced the far less adaptable Saracen.

As a finale on the Bloemfontein exercise range 81 Armoured Brigade held three exercises named Mainstay I, II and III in June, July and August, 1977 which were joint operations of armour and mechanized infantry. In Mainstay II, two PR squadrons formed a battle group with a mechanized company and two artillery batteries in direct support, plus a parachute company and a flight of Impale aircraft in support. The main exercise was preceded with nearly a week of training in quick attacks. Sadly, as so often, the Artillery safety officer’s delays took much excitement out of the quick attacks. A third PR squadron took part in Mainstay III which was held Schmidtsdrift.

In 1978 the Regiment was introduced to the newly established Army Battle School at Lohatlha. Here the approach was realism with night marches and firing on discarded old Sherman tanks as well as modernized gunnery practice. There was no doubt that the new methods did far more than previous approaches to make the Regiment ready for modern warfare.

The PR was exposed to a succession of field exercises from 1979 which eventually brought it to an extremely high standard of preparation and it was no surprise that in 1981, under the command of Cmdt Eddie Penzhorn, evaluation results earned the award of 81st Brigade’s trophy, the Olifant Poot, for the best unit in the Brigade.

=== Renamed again ===
After the establishment of the Republic of South Africa on 31 May 1961, the unit was again renamed Pretoria Regiment by the South African Defence Force. In the 1960s, recruits were trained on Centurion tanks and the new Eland armoured cars. The regiment assisted in the development of the Olifant MBT.

=== Border War ===
The Regiment had its first taste of being operational since 1960 in 1982 in Operation Panther 4 when it was called on to supply men for deployment as infantry for 60 days together with men form the Natal Mounted Rifles and the Light Horse Regiment under command of Capt P Kruger, a 1st Regiment Noord-Transvaal officer. Located at Oshivello they patrolled the cleared zone popularly known as they ‘kaplyn’ in the region of Tsumeb and Etosha.

This was followed in the same year by deployment as and infantry company for 90 days under the command of Maj Chris Raats with Capt Johnny Parsons as his Second-in-Command and WO2 Noel Honeyborne as the Company Sergeant Major. After a short training spell as Oshivello the company assumed duty at Etanga, south west of Ruacana. Here they patrolled on foot in the most forbidding country – waterless and hot at any time of the year.

The next spell of operational service came in 1984 when the Regiment provided the Headquarters of Battle Group Golf commanded by Acting Cmdt Chris Raats. Maj Johnny Parsons was the 21C again and Capt Tollie Nel was the Adjutant with WO1 Andy Carstens as RSM. Once again there was training at Oshivello, after which the Battle Group moved to 53 Battalion at Ondangua. From Ondangua they were deployed as the situation demanded and had the pleasure of being visited by the Honorary Colonel, Col Percy Kightley, MC, ED.

In April, 1985, the Regiment provided assistance to the School of Armour who were occupied with training Regiment Molopo to replace armoured cars with tanks. So successful was the training team led by WO2 Adam Loock that the Regiment was asked to repeat the process of tank conversion training in 1986, 1987, and 1990. Later in the year, from September to November 1985, a squadron was mobilized for 60 days to aid the Police in the region of Kempton Park and Daveyton.

Unexpectedly in December, 1987, a tank squadron from the Regiment was mobilized to serve in Angola in the Neighborhood of Cuito Cuanavale. Realizing that this was an opportunity for the senior personnel to gain experience of warfare, the CO, Cmdt Chris Raats, took command of the Squadron. Capt Frans Parsons was the 21C; the Regimental Sergeant Major WO1 Andy Carstens was Squadron Sergeant Major, assisted by WO2 CF Krugel and WO2 Theo Kriek as Squadron Quartermaster Sergeants . In due course Cmdt Raats had to withdraw and Maj Wim Grobler took command of the Squadron, which was attached to 61 Mechanised Battalion. Maj Grobler commanded the squadron with distinction in a late afternoon engagement at Cuito Cuanavale in January 1988. In 58 minutes his tanks destroyed nine enemy tanks without the loss of any men or tanks. The only fatal casualties sustained by the squadron were Sgt MG Pienaar, killed in an accident and Tpr HJ Nieuwoudt who was a victim of cerebral malaria. The theatre honour the squadron earned for the Regiment was South West Africa / Angola 1976-1989

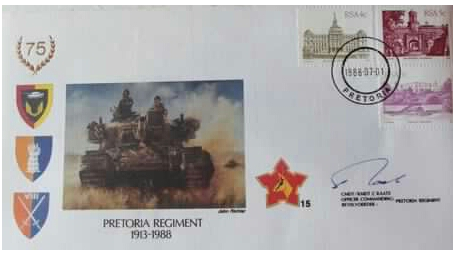
SADF era Regiment Pretoria commemorative letter

== SANDF era ==
=== Name Change ===
In August 2019, 52 Reserve Force units had their names changed to reflect the diverse military history of South Africa. The Pretoria Regiment became the Pretoria Armour Regiment, and have 3 years to design and implement new regimental insignia. Unlike others it was only a confirmation of the regiment's armoured role.

=== Role ===
The Pretoria Armour Regiment is a Reserve Force tank regiment of the South African Army Armoured Formation.

In the draft South African Army Vision 2020 force design, the 2007 organograms published with Leon Engelbrecht's unpublished manuscript A Guide to the SANDF chart the unit (then titled Pretoria Regiment) together with Regiment President Steyn as a tank regiment in the Armoured Brigade (Free State) of the Mechanised Division (headquarters Wallmansthal), alongside 1 SA Tank Regiment, 1 SSB (armoured cars) and 1 SAI (mechanised infantry).

== Equipment ==
| Name | Type | Country of Origin | In Service | Notes |
|---|---|---|---|---|
| Ford CMP | Utility truck | Canada | Retired | |
| Bedford MK | Utility truck | United Kingdom | Retired | |
| SAMIL | Utility truck | South Africa | Yes | SAMIL 20, 50, and 100 variants. |
| Morris C8 | Artillery tractor | United Kingdom | Ceremonial | |
| Eland | Armoured Car | South Africa | Retired | |
| Ferret | Scout Car | United Kingdom | Ceremonial | Mk 2. |
| Marmon-Herrington | Armoured Car | South Africa | Retired | Mk IV. |
| Ratel | Infantry Fighting Vehicle | South Africa | Yes | |
| Sherman Firefly | Medium Tank | United Kingdom | Retired | |
| Centurion | Main Battle Tank | United Kingdom | Retired | |
| Skokiaan | Main Battle Tank | United Kingdom/South Africa | Retired | |
| Semel | Main Battle Tank | United Kingdom/South Africa | Retired | |
| Olifant | Main Battle Tank | United Kingdom/South Africa | Yes | Mk 1A. |

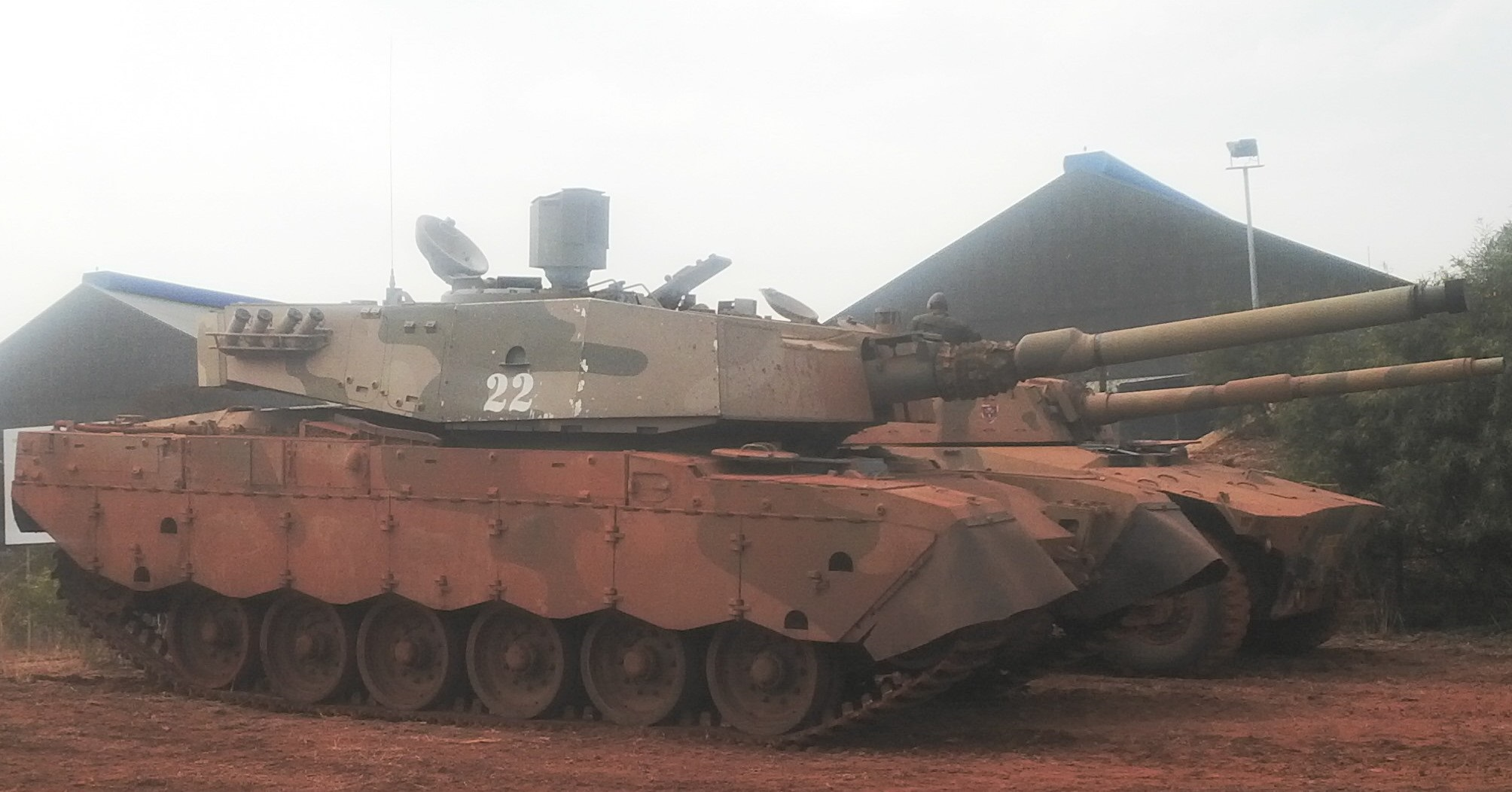
SANDF Oliphant mark 2 main battle tank at AAD 2016

== Insignia and honours ==
=== Regimental Symbols ===
- Badges: An impala on a mountain representing the Magaliesberg range to north of Pretoria, with in the foreground some succulents. Beneath the impala and the mountain is a ribbon bearing the regiment's motto, Nulli Secundus ("Second to None"). This motto was granted to the regiment by the then Prime Minister Louis Botha after the 1914 – 1915 campaign.

=== Previous dress insignia ===
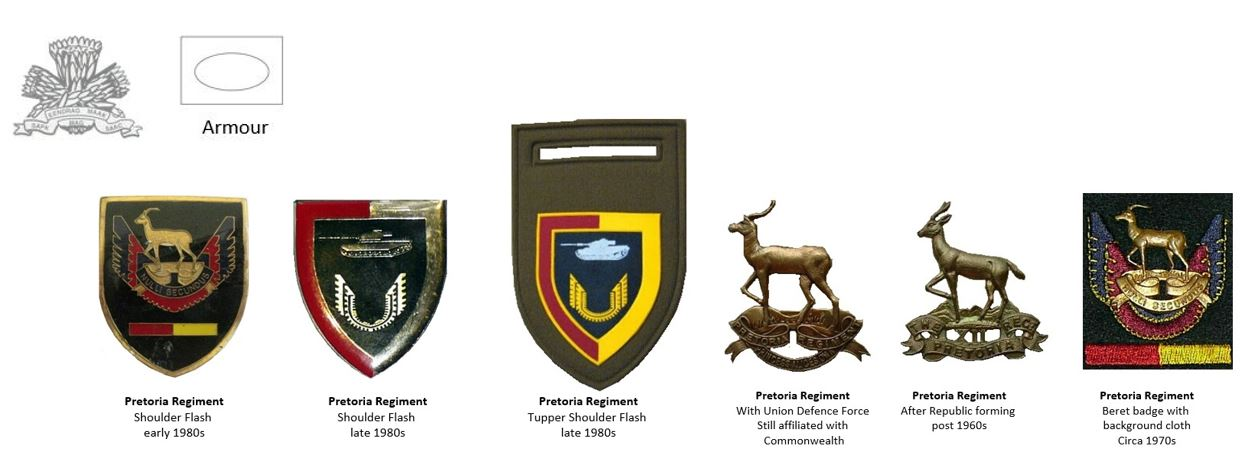
UDF and SADF eras Pretoria Regiment insignia

An unusual backing appeared on the regiment's cap badge around 1945 when it was associated with a British unit, the 24th Guards Brigade, when they were both part of the 6th South African Armoured Division. The two units had fought side by side on the Italian Front and ended their association by celebrating their co-operation; the 24th Guards Brigade gave their arm badge as a present to the unit. The two wings are therefore those depicted on the Guards Brigade arm patch.

- The regiment has been allied with The Royal Welsh Fusiliers since 1995 (as it was previously from 1927 to 1961).

=== Divisional Affiliation ===
- 8 South African Armoured Division
  - 81 Armoured Brigade

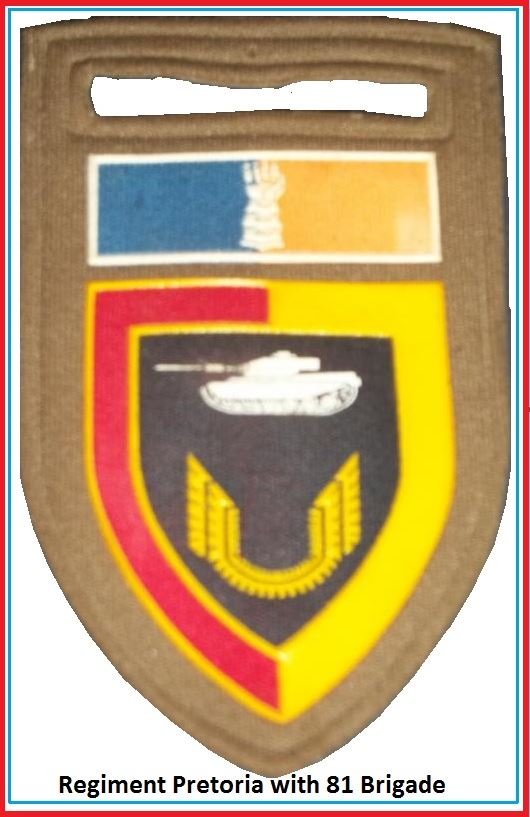
SADF 81 Armoured Brigade Regiment Pretoria Flash

=== Alliances ===
- United Kingdom – The Royal Welsh

=== Battle honours ===
| World War I | South-West Africa 1914-1915 | 1914–1915 |
| World War II | Madagascar 1942 | 1942 |
| World War II | Italy 1944-1945 | 1944-1945 |
| World War II | Bagno Regio | 1944 |
| World War II | Sarteano | 1944 |
| World War II | La Foce | 1944 |
| World War II | Florence | 1944 |
| World War II | Gothic Line | 1944 |
| World War II | Caterelto Ridge | 1944 |
| World War II | Po Valley | 1945 |
| South African Border War | South West Africa / Angola 1976-1989 | 1976-1989 |

Battle Honours
Awarded to Pretoria Regiment
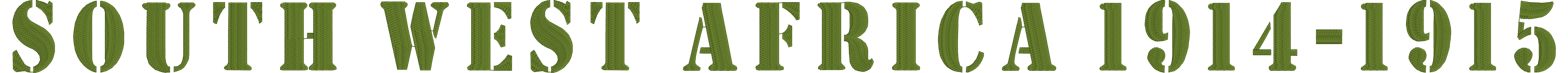
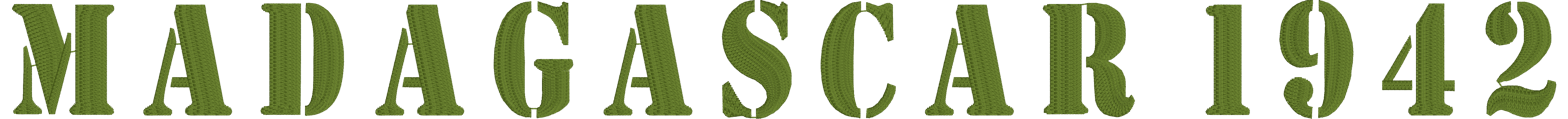
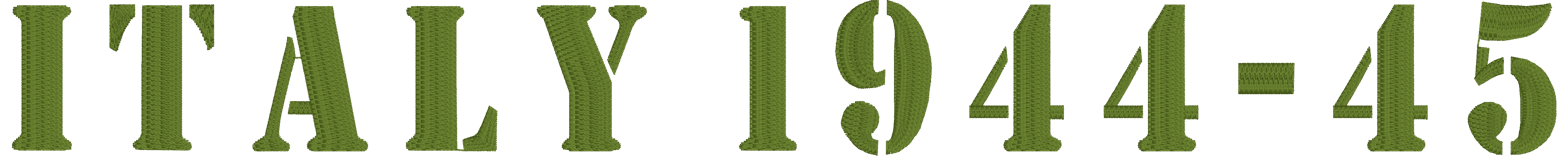
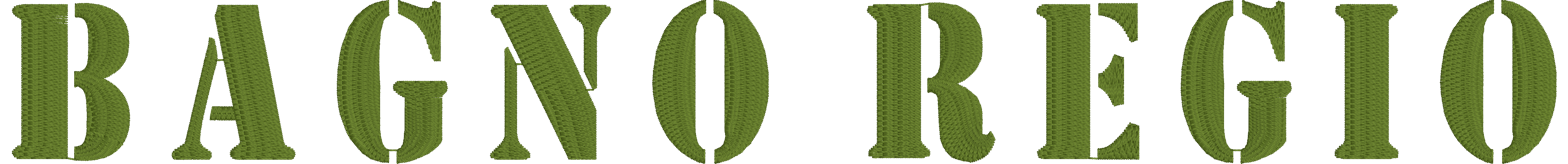
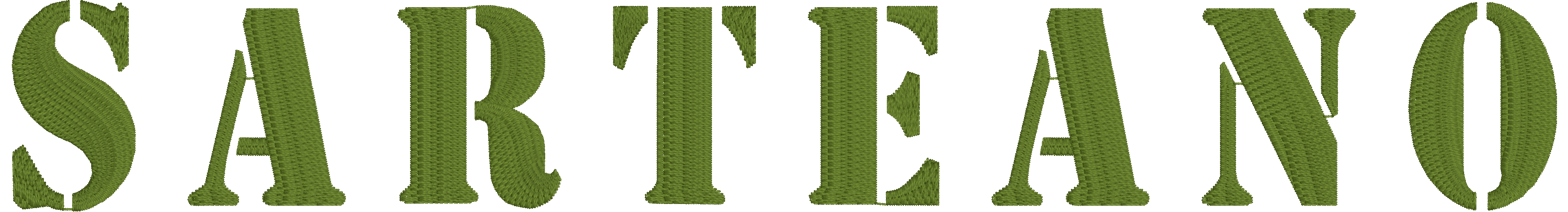
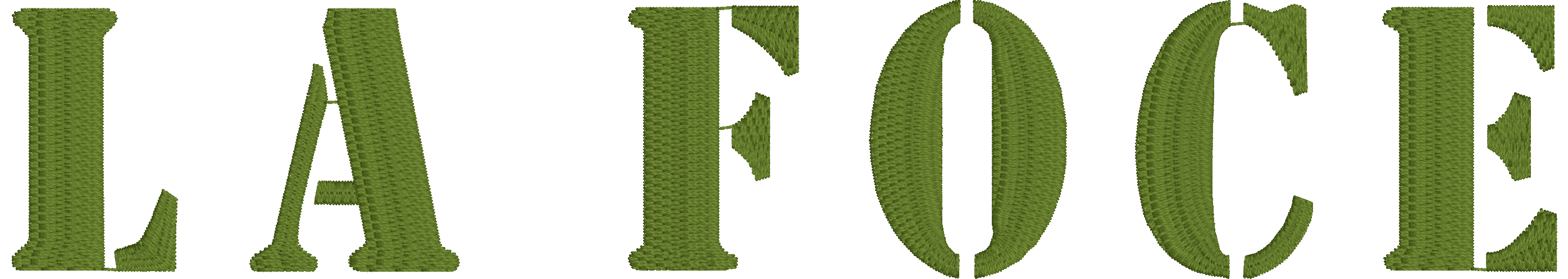
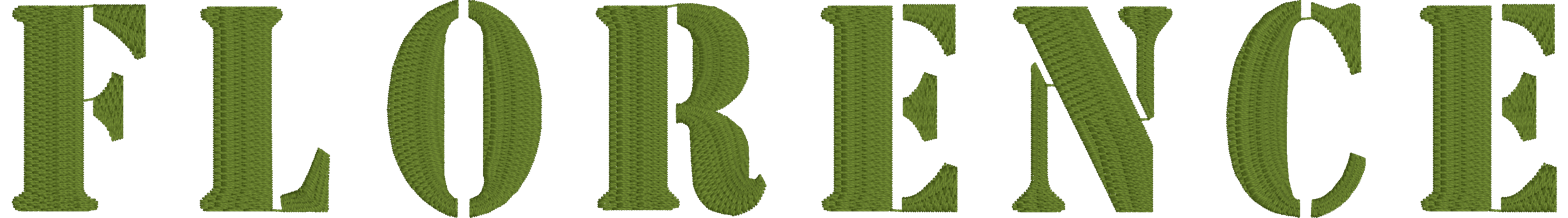
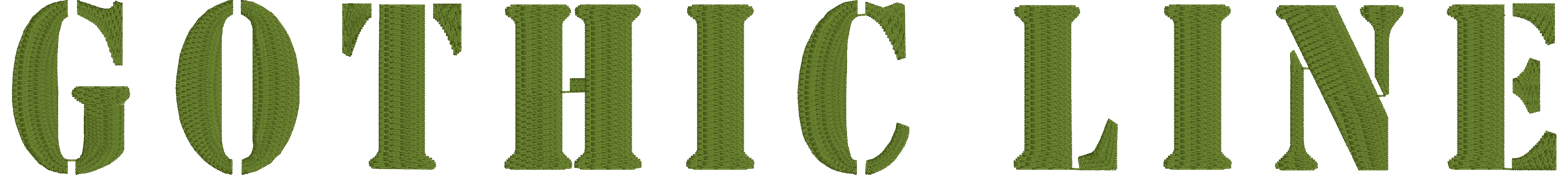
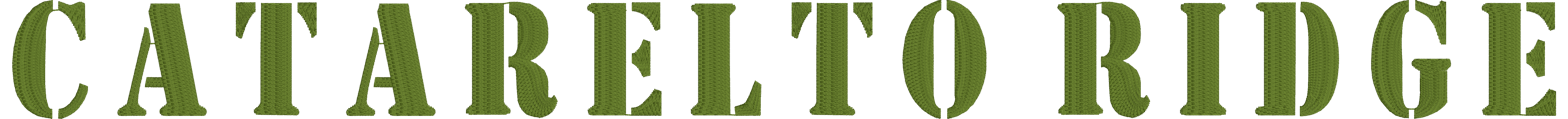
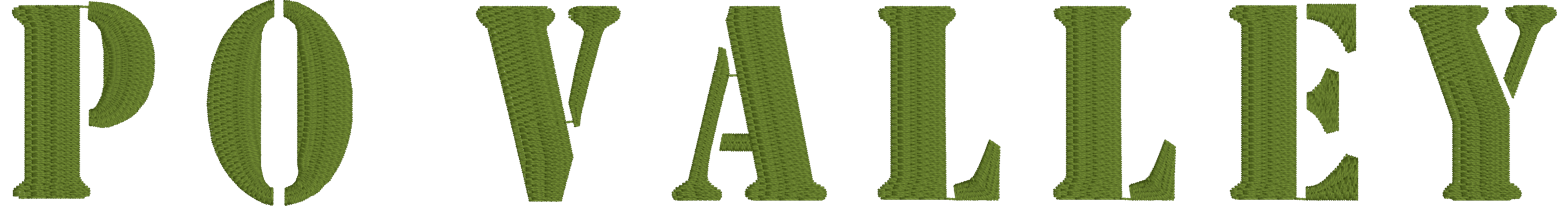
Unknown code: South West Africa / Angola 1976-1989

=== Official mascot ===
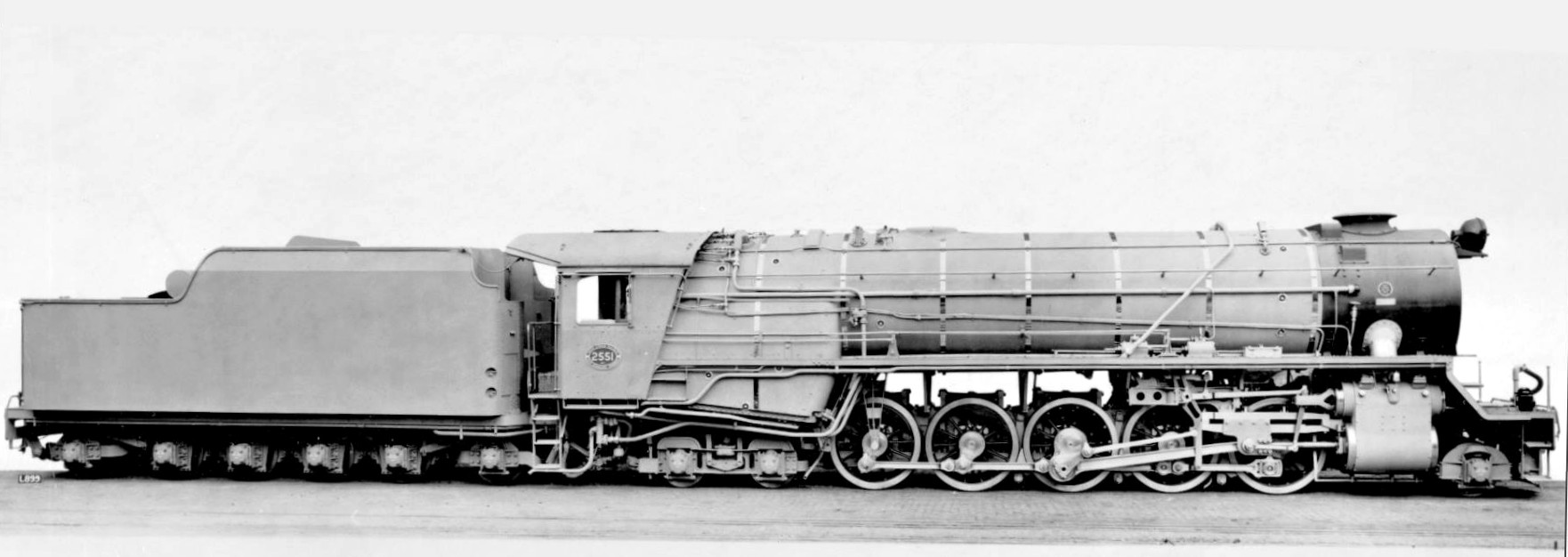
Class 21 no. 2551

During the Second World War, the sole Class 21 2-10-4 Texas type locomotive of the South African Railways (SAR) was often used to haul long and heavy military trains, troop trains and sometimes Italian prisoners-of-war to the military unit and prisoner-of-war camp at Sonderwater near Cullinan. In the process it was made the official mascot of the military unit in Pretoria, the Pretoria Regiment (Princess Alice's Own). The Class 21 was the only SAR locomotive to be honoured in this way by the armed forces.

== Leadership ==
Leadership
| From | Honorary Colonel | To | Ribbon |
|---|---|---|---|
| nd | Unknown | Unknown | |
| From | Officer Commanding | To | Ribbon |
| 1954 | Cmdt A.L. du PREEZ, ED (supernumarary) | 1957 | |
| 1954 | Cmdt H.S. MORONY, OBE ED | 1957 | |
| 1958 | Cmdt A.L. du PREEZ, ED | 1960 | |
| 1960 | Cmdt J.A. van JAARSVELD, JCD | 1965 | |
| 1965 | Cmdt H.R. DITTBERNER, JCD | 1970 | |
| 1970 | Cmdt B.V. BLIGNAUT, SM JCD | 1975 | |
| 1975 | Cmdt D.F.S. Fourie MMM,GCStJ,SD,JCD (Note: Later Brigadier General) | 1980 | Military Merit Medal MMM Venerable Order of Saint John GCStJ Southern Cross Decoration SD John Chard Decoration JCD |
| 1980 | Cmdt E.H. PENZHORN JCD MMM | 1985 | Military Merit Medal MMM |
| 1986 | Cmdt C RAATS JCD MMM | 1991 | Military Merit Medal MMM |
| 1991 | Cmdt W.F. GROBLER. MMM, JCD | 2000 | |
| 2000 | Lt Col C van der WESTUIZEN | 2017 | |
| 2017 | Lt Col MJB CHABALALA | 2026 | |
| 2026 | Maj H.J.W. STANDER (Note: Acting (Temporarily holding the post without confirmation)) | to date | |
| From | Regimental Sergeants Major | To | Ribbon |
| 1913 | RSM W.L. PENNY | 1914 | |
| 1914 | RSM S. MARTKS, DCM | 1915 | |
| 1922 | RSM W.P. COOPER | 1932 | |
| 1932 | RSM W.G. HOUGHTON | 1940 | |
| 1942 | WO1 M. FRIEDLANDER | 1946 | |
| 1947 | WO1 HAY (1PR), JCD | 1949 | |
| 1949 | WO1 A. RORKE (1PR) | 1952 | |
| 1947 | WO1 A.J.ERWEE (2PR) | 1950 | |
| 1950 | WO1 H.J. HIETBRINK (2PR) | 1950 | |
| 1955 | WO1 J. HEYNEKE | 1962 | |
| 1963 | WO2 R.P.JOUBERT | 1964 | |
| 1964 | WO1 C.W. HATTINGH, PMD PMM JCD | 1975 | |
| 1975 | WO1 H. van WIJK | 1979 | |
| 1979 | WO1 H.A. CARSTENS, JCD | 1988 | |
| 1989 | WO2 A.H.LOOCK, JCD | 1989 | |
| 1989 | WO2 C.F. KRUGEL | 1993 | |
| 1993 | WO1 K.J. MIENIE | 1995 | |
| 1995 | WO1 J. van BUUREN | 1999 | |
| 1999 | WO1 C.F. KRUGEL, JCD | 2000 | |
| 2000 | WO1 M.B. BRINK | 2001 | |
| 2001 | WO1 M. BARNARD | 2009 | |
| 2009 | WO1 C.F. KRUGEL, JCD | 2014 | |
| 2014 | WO1 C. HANCKE | 2017 | |
| 2017 | MWO PF LOUW | 2022 | |
| 2023 | MWO MJ MOSHEBI | To Date | |
