= Pretoria Highlanders =

Pretoria Highlanders Regiment
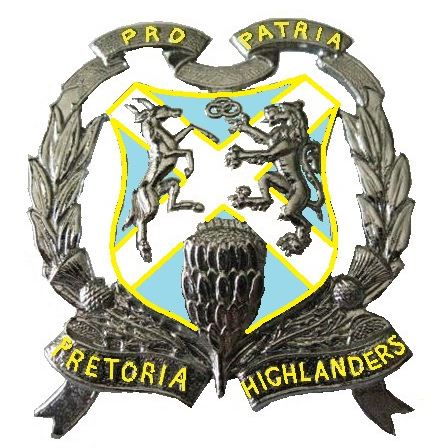
- SANDF Pretoria Highlanders emblem
- Active: 1939 to 4 June 2017
- Disbanded: 4 June 2017
- Country: South Africa
- Allegiance: Republic of South Africa; Republic of South Africa
- Branch: South African Army; South African Army
- Type: Reserve Artillery
- Size: Battery
- Part of: South African Army Artillery Formation; Army Conventional Reserve
- Nickname: Jacaranda Jocks
Battle honours
Battle Honours
Awarded
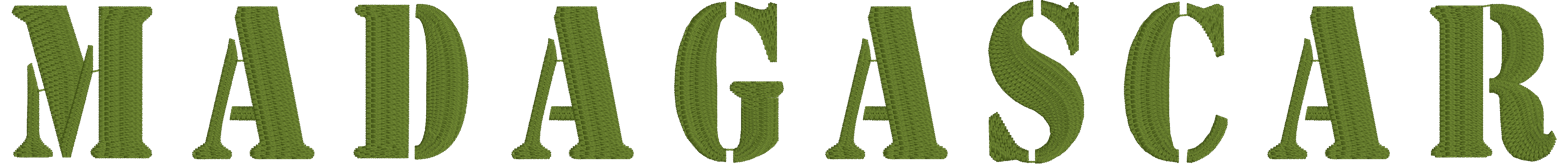

Insignia
- Collar Badge: Bursting grenade with seven flames
- Beret Colour: Oxford Blue
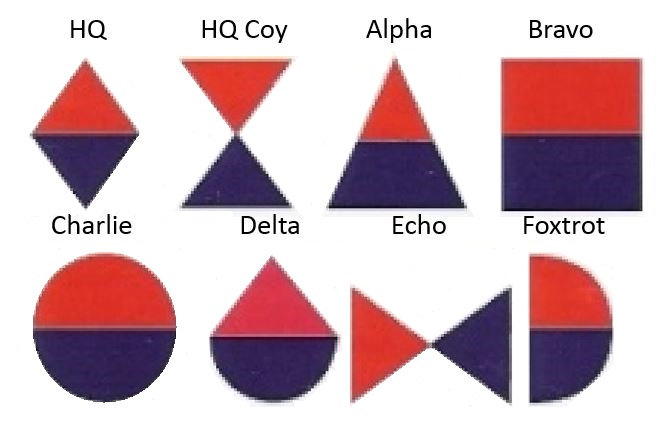
- Artillery Battery Emblems

- Artillery Beret Bar circa 1992

The Pretoria Highlanders Regiment was a regiment of the South African Army. As a reserve unit, it had a status roughly equivalent to that of a British Army Reserve or United States Army National Guard unit.

Though the regiment was disbanded, the associated pipe band continues to operate.

== History ==
=== World War 2 ===
The regiment was founded by Peter Lawrence Goudie on the outbreak of World War II in 1939. He recruited 1,400 men within six weeks and also raised the funds to equip them with Highland uniforms.

During World War II the regiment, as part of 7th South African Infantry Brigade, took part in "Operation Rose", the invasion of Madagascar by South African forces in June 1942. As far as is known, this is the first (and only) amphibious operation in which South African troops ever participated.

=== Post World War and into Border War ===
In 1946, the PH were converted to artillery and renamed 1 Anti-Tank Regiment (PH). When the Army was reorganised in 1960, for internal security duties, the regiment was converted to Armoured Cars and reverted to its original name of Pretoria Highlanders. In 1989 the regiment was converted to a Tank Unit until its amalgamation with Pretoria Regiment in 1997.

The regiment was assigned to the 7th Division's 73 Motorised Brigade.

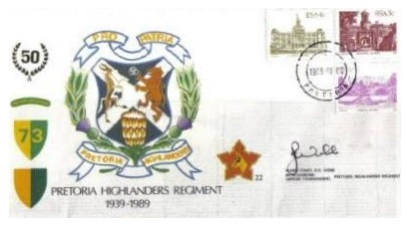
73 Brigade Pretoria Highlanders commemorative letter circa 1989

== Pipe Band ==
An early band was established around the time of the regiment's formation. The post-war Pretoria Highlanders Pipes and Drums was established in 1979. It was disbanded in 2005, by which time it received no official defence force support. The band was re-established and held its first gathering on 13 April 2013.

== Leadership ==
Pretoria Highlanders Leadership
From	Officer Commanding	To	Ribbon
	Cmdt Keith Ingram		
	Cmdt Braam Botes		
	Cmdt Richard Webb		
	Cmdt Henk Kaal		
	Lt Col Hein Kruger		
From	Regimental Sergeant Major	To	Ribbon
	No known incumbents		

== Regimental Symbols ==
- Uniform
  - Headdress: khaki Tam O'Shanter, black glengarry; Tourie (on both): bottle green.
  - Tartan: Hunting Stewart (kilt); Sporran: brown leather as working dress and silver/grey haired for mess dress .
  - Hose: khaki with tops of regimental tartan, green garter flashes.
- Nickname: "Jacaranda Jocks" (Pretoria is known as "the Jacaranda City")

=== Previous Dress Insignia ===
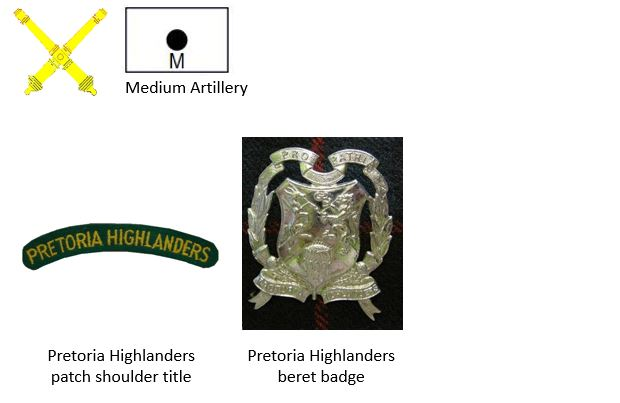
SADF era Pretoria Highlanders insignia

== Battle honours ==
Battle Honours
Awarded to the Pretoria Highlanders
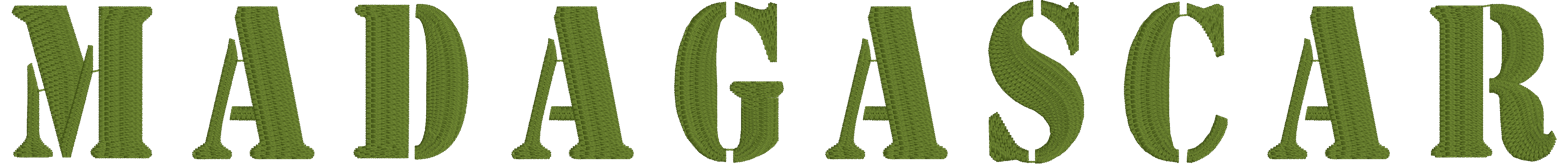

- Madagascar 1942
