= Battle of Madagascar =

Campaign during WWII

- Part of the Indian Ocean theatre of World War II
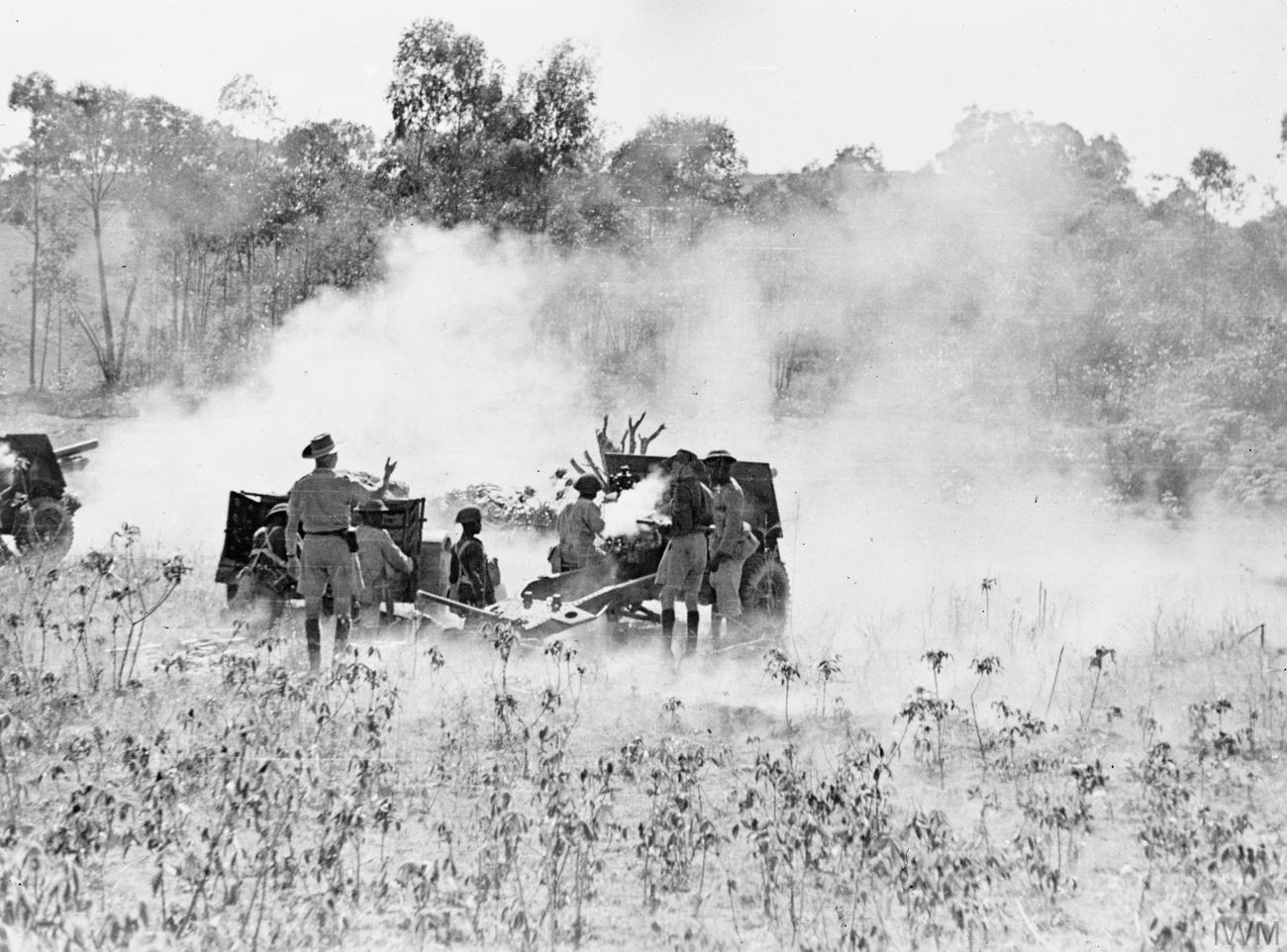
- King's African Rifles' 25-pounder battery in action near Ambositra in Madagascar against Vichy positions during Operation Stream Line Jane, September 1942
Date	5 May – 6 November 1942 (6 months and 1 day)
Location	Madagascar, Indian Ocean 12°16′S 49°17′E
Result	Allied victory
Territorial changes	Free French administration established in Madagascar

Belligerents
United Kingdom: India; Northern Rhodesia; Southern Rhodesia; South Africa: Naval only: Australia; Netherlands; Poland; Norway	Vichy France: Madagascar; Naval only: Japan

Commanders and leaders
(United Kingdom) Robert Sturges (United Kingdom) Edward Syfret	(Vichy France) Armand Annet (surrendered) (Empire of Japan) Noboru Ishizaki

Strength
10,000–15,000 soldiers 6 infantry tanks 6 light tanks 2 aircraft carriers 1 seaplane carrier 1 battleship 6 light cruisers 22 destroyers 8 corvettes 1 monitor 1 minelayer 4 minesweepers 5 assault transports over 81 aircraft	Vichy France: 8,000 soldiers 6 tanks 35 aircraft 4 warships Japanese Navy; 95 soldiers 4 submarines 2 midget submarines 1 reconnaissance aircraft

Casualties and losses
107 killed 280 wounded 108 died from disease 1 battleship heavily damaged 1 oil tanker sunk 8 tanks destroyed	152 killed 500 wounded (does not include any casualties caused by disease); 1,000 captured 34 aircraft destroyed 1 midget submarine destroyed 1 midget submarine lost at sea
- Location of Diego-Suarez Bay

The Battle of Madagascar (5 May – 6 November 1942) was an Allied campaign to capture the Vichy French−controlled island Madagascar during World War II. The seizure of the island by the British was to deny Madagascar's ports to the Imperial Japanese Navy and to prevent the loss or impairment of the Allied shipping routes to India, Australia and Southeast Asia. It began with Operation Ironclad, the seizure of the port of Diego-Suarez (now Antsiranana) near the northern tip of the island, on 5 May 1942.

A campaign to secure the rest of the island, Operations Stream, Line and Jane, was opened on 10 September. The Allies broke into the interior, linking up with forces on the coast and secured the island by the end of October. Fighting ceased and an armistice was granted on 6 November. This was the first big operation by the Allies combining sea, land and air forces. The island was placed under Free French control.

== Background ==
=== Geopolitical ===
Diego-Suarez is a large bay, with a fine harbour, near the northern tip of the island of Madagascar. It has an opening to the east through a narrow channel called Oronjia Pass. The naval base of Diego-Suarez lies on a peninsula between two of the four small bays enclosed within Diego-Suarez Bay. The bay cuts deeply into the northern tip of Madagascar's Cape Amber, almost severing it from the rest of the island. In the 1880s, the bay was coveted by France, which claimed it as a coaling station for steamships travelling to French possessions farther east. The colonization was formalized after the first Franco-Hova War when Queen Ranavalona III signed a treaty on 17 December 1885 giving France a protectorate over the bay and surrounding territory; as well as the islands of Nosy Be and St. Marie de Madagascar. The colony's administration was subsumed into that of French Madagascar in 1897.

In 1941, Diego-Suarez town, the bay and the channel were well protected by naval shore batteries.

=== Vichy ===
Following the Japanese conquest of Southeast Asia east of Burma by the end of February 1942, submarines of the Imperial Japanese Navy moved freely throughout the north and eastern expanses of the Indian Ocean. In March, Japanese aircraft carriers raided merchant ships in the Bay of Bengal, and attacked bases in Colombo and Trincomalee in Ceylon (now Sri Lanka). This raid drove the British Eastern Fleet out of the area and they were forced to relocate to a new base at Kilindini Harbour, Mombasa, Kenya.

The move made the British fleet more vulnerable to attack. The possibility of Japanese naval forces using forward bases in Madagascar had to be addressed. The potential use of these facilities particularly threatened Allied merchant shipping, the supply route to the British Eighth Army and also the Eastern Fleet.

Japanese Kaidai-type submarines had the longest range of any Axis submarines at the time – more than 10,000 mi (16,000 km) in some cases. If the Imperial Japanese Navy's submarines could use bases on Madagascar, Allied lines of communication would be affected across a region stretching from the Pacific and Australia, to the Middle East and as far as the South Atlantic.

On 17 December 1941, Vice Admiral Fricke, Chief of Staff of Germany's Maritime Warfare Command (Seekriegsleitung), met Vice Admiral Naokuni Nomura, the Japanese naval attaché, in Berlin to discuss the delimitation of respective operational areas between the German Kriegsmarine and Imperial Japanese Navy forces. At another meeting on 27 March 1942, Fricke stressed the importance of the Indian Ocean to the Axis powers and expressed the desire that the Japanese begin operations against the northern Indian Ocean sea routes. Fricke further emphasized that Ceylon, the Seychelles, and Madagascar should have a higher priority for the Axis navies than operations against Australia. By 8 April, the Japanese announced to Fricke that they intended to commit four or five submarines and two auxiliary cruisers for operations in the western Indian Ocean between Aden and the Cape of Good Hope, but they refused to disclose their plans for operations against Madagascar and Ceylon, only reiterating their commitment to operations in the area.

=== Allies ===
The Allies had heard the rumours of Japanese plans for the Indian Ocean and on 27 November 1941, the British Chiefs of Staff discussed the possibility that the Vichy government might cede the whole of Madagascar to Japan, or alternatively permit the Japanese Navy to establish bases on the island. British naval advisors urged the occupation of the island as a precautionary measure. On 16 December, General Charles de Gaulle, leader of the Free French in London, sent a letter to the British Prime Minister, Winston Churchill, in which he also urged a Free French operation against Madagascar. Churchill recognised the risk of a Japanese-controlled Madagascar to Indian Ocean shipping, particularly to the important sea route to India and Ceylon, and considered the port of Diego-Suarez as the strategic key to Japanese influence in the Indian Ocean. However, he also made it clear to planners that he did not feel Britain had the resources to mount such an operation and, following experience in the Battle of Dakar in September 1940, did not want a joint operation launched by British and Free French forces to secure the island.

By 12 March 1942, Churchill had been convinced of the importance of such an operation and the decision was reached that the planning of the invasion of Madagascar would begin in earnest. It was agreed that the Free French would be explicitly excluded from the operation. As a preliminary battle outline, Churchill gave the following guidelines to the planners for Operation Bonus:

- Force H, the ships guarding the Western Mediterranean, should move south from Gibraltar and should be replaced by an American Task Force
- The 4,000 men and ships proposed by Lord Mountbatten for the operation should be retained as the nucleus around which the plan should be built
- The operation should commence around 30 April 1942
- In the event of success, the commandos recommended by Mountbatten should be replaced by garrison troops as soon as possible

On 14 March, Force 121 was constituted under the command of Major-General Robert Sturges of the Royal Marines with Rear-Admiral Edward Syfret being placed in command of naval Force H and the supporting sea force.

== Allied preparations ==
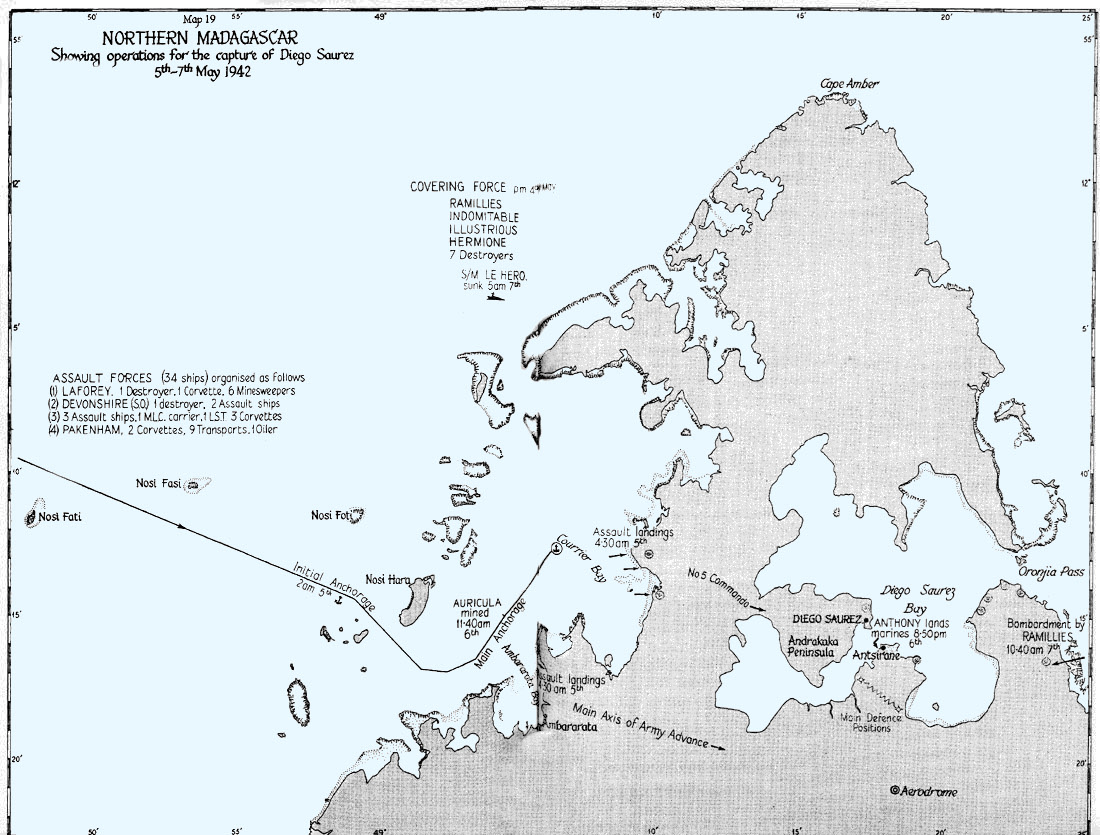
Map of the assault

Force 121 left the Clyde in Scotland on 23 March and joined with Syfret's ships at Freetown in Sierra Leone, proceeding from there in two convoys to their assembly point at Durban on the South African east coast. Here they were joined by the 13th Brigade Group of the 5th Division – General Sturges' force consisting of three infantry brigades, while Syfret's squadron consisted of the flag battleship HMS Ramillies, aircraft carriers HMS Illustrious and HMS Indomitable, cruisers HMS Hermione and HMS Devonshire, eleven destroyers, six minesweepers, six corvettes and auxiliaries. It was a formidable force to bring against the 8,000 troops (mostly conscripted Malagasy) at Diego-Suarez, but the chiefs of staff were adamant that the operation was to succeed, preferably without any fighting.

This was to be the first British amphibious assault since the disastrous landings in the Dardanelles twenty-seven years before.

During the assembly in Durban, Field-Marshal Jan Smuts pointed out that the mere seizure of Diego-Suarez would be no guarantee against continuing Japanese aggression and urged that the ports of Majunga and Tamatave be occupied as well. This was evaluated by the chiefs of staff, but it was decided to retain Diego-Suarez as the only objective due to the lack of manpower. Churchill remarked that the only way to permanently secure Madagascar was by means of a strong fleet and adequate air support operating from Ceylon and sent General Archibald Wavell (India Command) a note stating that as soon as the initial objectives had been met, all responsibility for safeguarding Madagascar would be passed on to Wavell. He added that when the commandos were withdrawn, garrison duties would be performed by two African brigades and one brigade from the Belgian Congo or west coast of Africa.

In March and April, the South African Air Force (SAAF) had conducted reconnaissance flights over Diego-Suarez and No. 32, 36 and 37 Coastal Flights were withdrawn from maritime patrol operations and sent to Lindi on the Indian Ocean coast of Tanganyika, with an additional eleven Bristol Beauforts and six Martin Marylands to provide close air support during the planned operations.

== Campaign ==
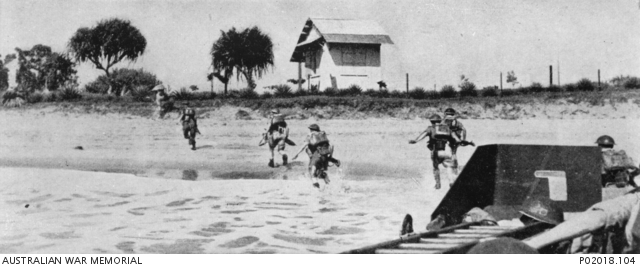
Allied soldiers landing from LCAs at Tamatave in May 1942

Allied commanders decided to launch an amphibious assault on Madagascar, Operation Ironclad, executed by Force 121. It included Allied naval, land and air forces and was commanded by Major-General Robert Sturges of the Royal Marines. The British Army landing force included the 29th Independent Infantry Brigade Group, No 5 (Army) Commando, and two brigades of the 5th Infantry Division, the latter en route to India with the remainder of the division. The Allied naval contingent consisted of over 50 vessels, drawn from Force H, the Home Fleet and the British Eastern Fleet, commanded by Syfret. The fleet included the aircraft carrier HMS Illustrious, her sister ship Indomitable and the ageing battleship HMS Ramillies to cover the landings.

=== Landings (Operation Ironclad) ===
Following numerous reconnaissance missions by the South African Air Force, the first wave of the British 29th Infantry Brigade and No. 5 Commando landed in Landing Craft Assault on 5 May, with follow-up waves by two brigades of the 5th Infantry Division and Royal Marines. All were carried ashore by landing craft to Courrier Bay and Ambararata Bay, just west of the major port of Diego-Suarez, at the northern tip of Madagascar. A diversionary attack was staged to the east. Air cover was provided mainly by Fairey Albacore and Fairey Swordfish torpedo bombers which attacked Vichy shipping and the airfield at Arrachart. They were supported by Grumman Martlet fighters from the Fleet Air Arm. A small number of SAAF planes assisted. The Swordfish sank the armed merchant cruiser Bougainville and then the submarine Bévéziers; one Swordfish was shot down by anti-aircraft fire and its crew taken prisoner. The aircraft shot down had been dropping leaflets in French that encouraged the Vichy troops to surrender.

The defending Vichy forces, led by Governor General Armand Léon Annet, included about 8,000 troops, of whom about 6,000 were Malagasy tirailleurs (colonial infantry). A large proportion of the rest were Senegalese. Between 1,500 and 3,000 Vichy troops were concentrated around Diego-Suarez. Naval and air defences were relatively light or obsolete with eight coastal batteries, two armed merchant cruisers, two sloops, five submarines, 17 M.S. 406 fighters and ten Potez 63 bombers.

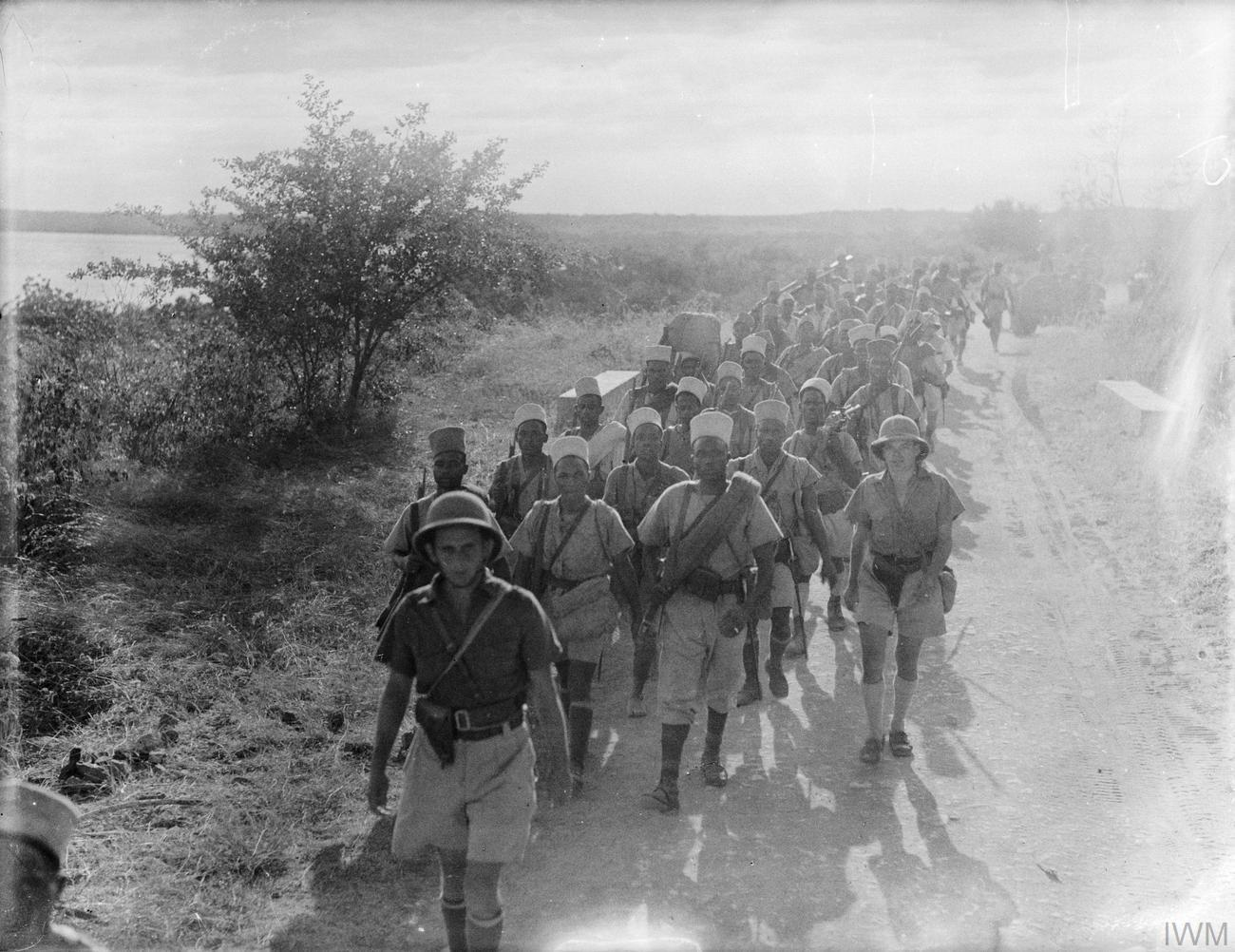
Captured French troops marching away from their HQ after the British had captured Diego-Suarez on 7 May

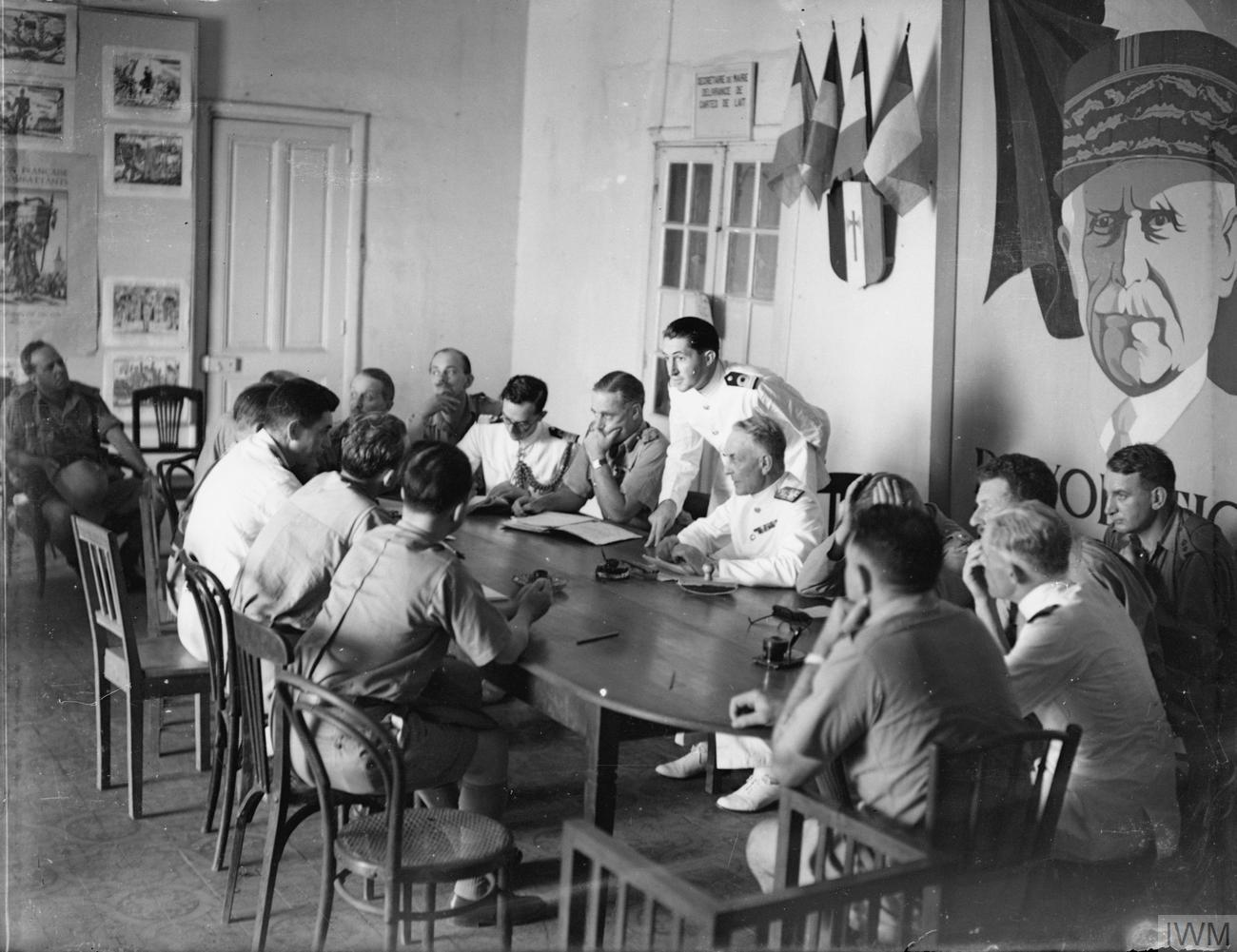
Negotiations for the surrender of Diego-Suarez at the British headquarters in the town

The beach landings met with virtually no resistance, and these troops seized Vichy coastal batteries and barracks. The Courier Bay force, the British 17th Infantry Brigade, after toiling through mangrove swamp and thick bush, took the town of Diego-Suarez and captured a hundred prisoners. The Ambararata Bay force, the 29th Independent Brigade, headed towards the French naval base of Antisarane. With assistance from six Valentines of 'B' Special Service Squadron and six Tetrarch light tanks of 'C' Special Service Squadron, they advanced 21 mi (34 km), overcoming light resistance with bayonet charges. Antisarane was elaborately defended with trenches, two redoubts, and pillboxes, and flanked on both sides by impenetrable swamps. Arrachart airfield was attacked, and five of the Morane fighters were destroyed and another two damaged, while two Potez-63s were also damaged. This attack eliminated a quarter of Vichy air strength on the island. Two Morane fighters did briefly appear and strafe beaches at Courier Bay, but two more Vichy aircraft were lost on the first day.

On the morning of 6 May, a frontal assault on the defences failed with the loss of three Valentines and two Tetrarchs. Three Vichy Potez 63s attempted to attack the beach landing points but were intercepted by British Martlets and two were shot down. Albacores were used to bomb French defences and a Swordfish managed to sink the submarine Le Héros. By the end of the day, fierce resistance had resulted in the destruction of 10 out of the 12 tanks the British had brought to Madagascar. The British had been unaware of the strength of the French defences, known as the 'Joffre line', and were greatly surprised at the level of resistance they came across. Another assault by the South Lancashires worked its way around the Vichy defences but the swamps and bad terrain meant the unit was broken into groups. It swung behind the Vichy line and caused chaos. Fire was poured on the Vichy defences from behind, and the radio station and a barracks were captured. In all, 200 prisoners were taken but the South Lancashires had to withdraw as communication with the main force was lost after the radio set failed. At this time, the Vichy government in France began to learn of the landings, and Admiral Darlan sent a message to Governor Annet telling him to "Firmly defend the honour of our flag", and "Fight to the limit of your possibilities ... and make the British pay dearly." The Vichy forces then asked for assistance from the Japanese, who were in no position to provide substantial support.

Faced with the extent of Vichy French resistance, the old destroyer HMS Anthony broke the deadlock when it dashed straight past the Antisarane harbour defences and landed fifty Royal Marines from Ramillies amidst the Vichy rear area. The marines created a "disturbance in the town out of all proportion to their numbers", taking the French artillery command post along with its barracks and the naval depot. At the same time, the 17th Infantry Brigade had broken through the defences and was soon in the town. With the Vichy defence broken, Antisarane surrendered that evening, though substantial Vichy forces withdrew to the south. On 7 May, Martlets encountered three French M.S. 406 fighters, which shot down one Martlet. All three French fighters were then shot down; by the third day of the attack on Madagascar, twelve Moranes and five Potez 63s had been destroyed out of a total of 35 Vichy aircraft on the island. Three Potez bombers were destroyed on the ground during a raid on Majunga on 15 May. Fighting continued into 7 May but by the end of the day, Operation Ironclad had concluded. In three days of fighting, the British had seen 109 men killed and 283 wounded, with the French suffering 700 casualties.

The Japanese submarines I-10, I-16, and I-20 arrived three weeks later on 29 May. I-10's reconnaissance plane spotted Ramillies at anchor in Diego-Suarez harbour, but the plane was spotted and Ramillies changed her berth. I-20 and I-16 launched two midget submarines, one of which managed to enter the harbour and fire two torpedoes while under depth charge attack from two corvettes. One torpedo seriously damaged Ramillies, while the second sank the 6,993 GRT oil tanker British Loyalty (later refloated). Ramillies was later repaired in Durban and Plymouth. The crew of one of the midget submarines, Lieutenant Saburo Akieda and Petty Officer Masami Takemoto, beached their craft (M-20b) at Nosy Antalikely and moved inland towards their pick-up point near Cape Amber. They were betrayed when they bought food at the village of Anijabe and both were killed in a firefight with Royal Marines three days later. One marine was killed in the action as well. The second midget submarine was lost at sea and the body of a crewman was found washed ashore a day later.

=== Ground campaign (Operations Stream, Line and Jane) ===
Hostilities continued at a low level for several months. After 19 May, two brigades of the 5th Infantry Division were transferred to India. On 8 June, the 22nd (East Africa) Brigade Group arrived on Madagascar. The 7th South African Motorized Brigade arrived on 24 June. On 2 July, an invasion force was sent to the Vichy-held island of Mayotte to take control of its valuable radio station and use it as a base for British operations in the area. The island's defenders were caught by surprise and the radio station and most of the sleeping defenders were captured. The Chief of Police and a few others attempted to escape by car but were stopped by roadblocks that had been set up. The island's capture was carried out with no loss of life or major damage.

British troops advancing along the coast of Tamatave, Madagascar's principal port, 18 September 1942

The 27th (North Rhodesia) Infantry Brigade (including forces from East Africa) landed in Madagascar on 8 August. The Vichy governor of Madagascar, Annet, attempted to obtain reinforcements from the central Vichy government, particularly aircraft, but was unable to do so. By August, Vichy air strength on the island consisted of four Morane fighters and three Potez-63s. The operation code-named Stream Line Jane (sometimes given as Streamline Jane) consisted of three sub-operations code-named Stream, Line and Jane. Stream and Jane were, respectively, the amphibious landings at Majunga on 10 September and Tamatave on 18 September, while Line was the advance from Majunga to the French capital, Tananarive, which fell on 23 September.

On 10 September, the 29th Brigade and 22nd Brigade Group made an amphibious landing at Majunga, another port on the west coast of the island. No. 5 Commando spearheaded the landing and faced machine gun fire, but still stormed the quayside, took control of the local post office, captured the governor's residence, and raised the Union Jack. Having severed communications with Tananarive, the Allies intended to re-launch the offensive ahead of the rainy season. Progress was slow for the Allied forces. In addition to occasional small-scale clashes with Vichy forces, they also encountered scores of obstacles erected on the main roads by Vichy soldiers. Vichy forces attempted to destroy the second bridge on the Majunga–Tananarive road, but only succeeded in causing the central span of the bridge to sag merely 3 ft (0.91 m) into the river below, meaning that Allied vehicles could still pass over. Once the Vichy forces realised their mistake, a Potez-63 aircraft was sent to drop bombs to finish off the bridge, but the attack failed. The Allies eventually captured the capital, Tananarive, without much opposition, and then the town of Ambalavao but Annet escaped.

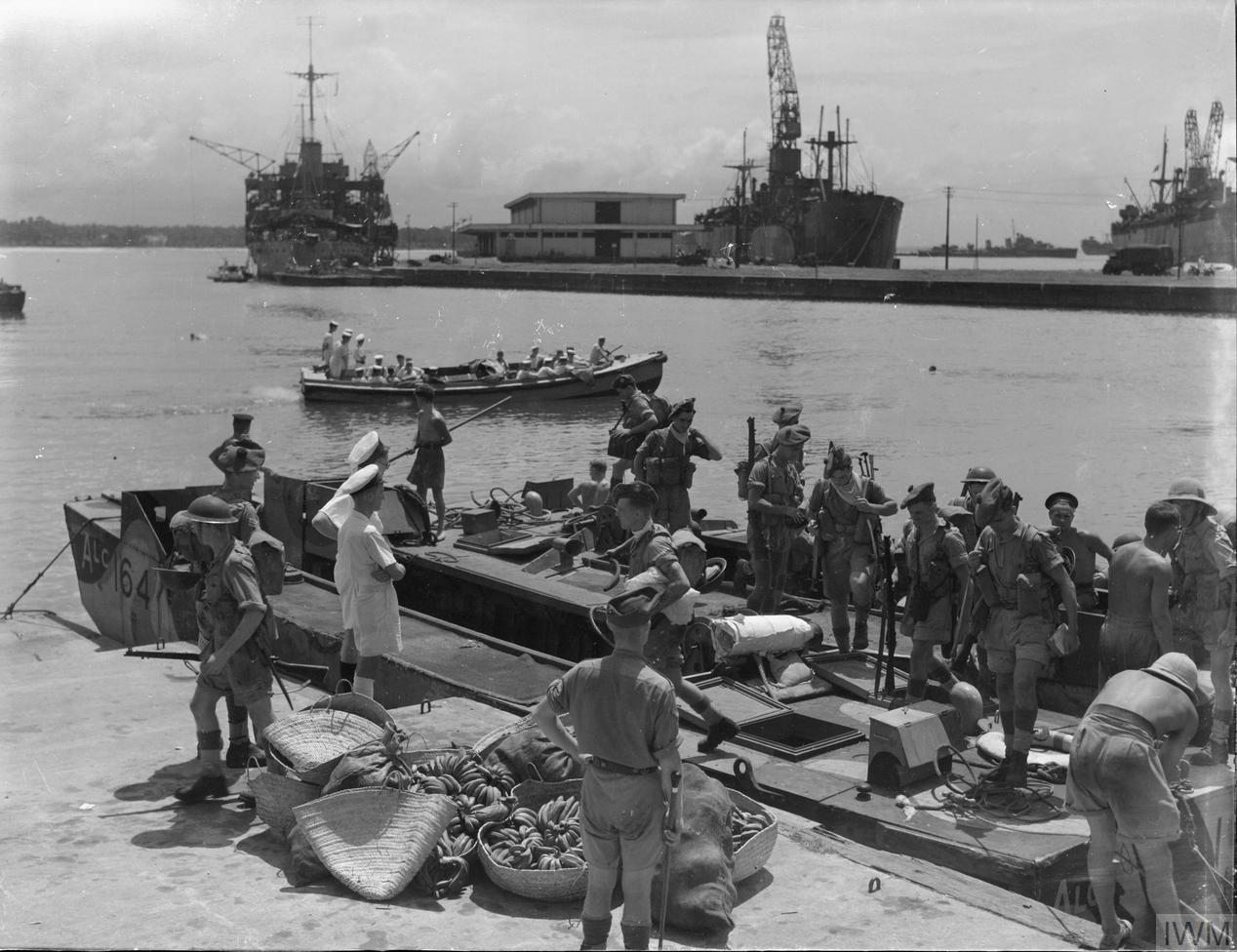
19 September 1942. Allied troops disembarking from an LCA in Tamatave harbour.

Eight days later, a British force set out to capture Tamatave. Heavy surf interfered with the operation. As HMS Birmingham's launch was heading to shore, it was fired at by French shore batteries and promptly turned around. Birmingham then opened her guns on the shore batteries, and within three minutes the French raised the white flag and surrendered. From there the South Lancashires and the Royal Welch Fusiliers set out to the south to link up with forces there. After they reached Tananarive, they pressed on towards Moramanga and on 25 September linked up with the King's African Rifles, having secured the British lines of communication around the island. At the same time, the East African infantry and South African armoured cars set out to find Annet. The same day, a bombing raid was launched by South African Marylands on a Vichy-held fort in Fianarantsoa, the only big town that was still in French hands and where the remaining Vichy aircraft were now based. Also on September 25, British forces landed in the Comoros. Tetrarch and Valentine tanks of 'B' and 'C' Special Service Squadrons had been embarked for use in these operations, but they were not used as they could not ford the Ivondro River and the railway bridges were unsuitable.

On 29 September, two companies of the South African Pretoria Highlanders performed the only amphibious landing by South African forces of the entire war at the west coast harbor town of Tulear, some 900 mi (1,400 km) south of Diego Suarez. Birmingham, 2 destroyers and 200 Royal Marines supported the unopposed landing. On 6 October, a Morane fighter strafed British positions near Antinchi, and on 8 October a British bombing raid on Ihosy airfield destroyed four Vichy aircraft.

The last major action took place on 18 October at Andramanalina, a U-shaped valley of the meandering Mangarahara River where an ambush was planned for British forces by Vichy troops. The King's African Rifles split into two columns, marched around the 'U' of the valley, met Vichy troops in the rear and ambushed them. The Vichy troops suffered many losses, which resulted in 800 of them surrendering. A Morane fighter was operational until 21 October, and even strafed South African troops, but by 21 October the only serviceable aircraft the Vichy forces had was a Salmson Phrygane transport aircraft. On 25 October, the King's African Rifles entered Fianarantsoa but found Annet gone, this time near Ihosy 100 mi (160 km) south. The Africans swiftly moved after him, but they received an envoy from Annet asking for terms of surrender. He had had enough and could not flee further. An armistice was signed in Ambalavao on 6 November, and Annet surrendered two days later.

The Allies suffered about 500 casualties in the landing at Diego-Suarez, and 30 more killed and 90 wounded in the operations which followed on 10 September 1942. Julian Jackson, in his biography of de Gaulle, observed that the French had held out longer against the Allies in Madagascar in 1942 than they had against the Germans in France in 1940.

== Aftermath ==
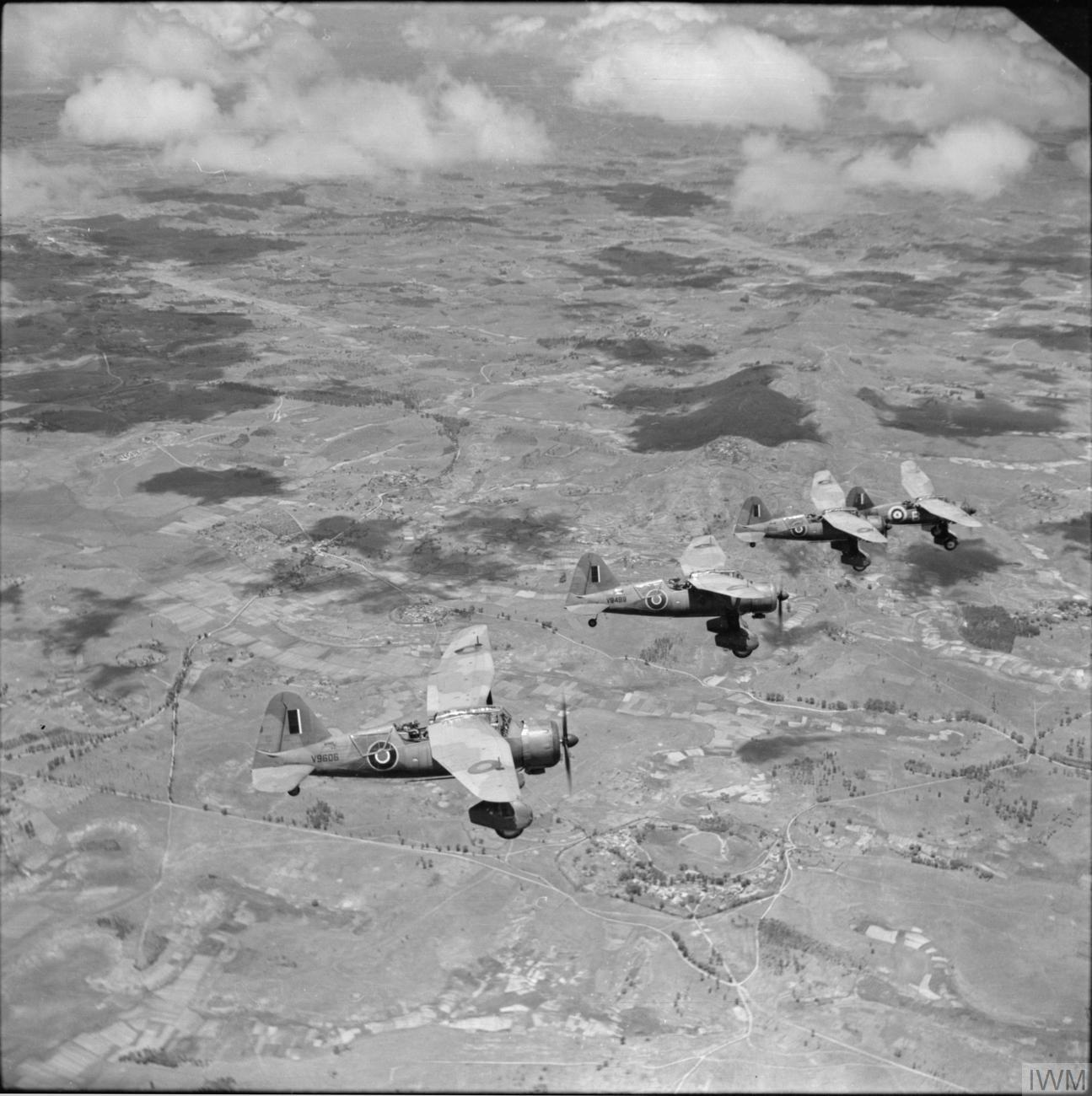
December 1942. Four RAF Westland Lysander aircraft fly over Madagascar after the campaign.

With Madagascar in their hands, the Allies established military and naval installations across the island. The island was crucial for the rest of the war. Its deep water ports were vital for control of the passageway to India and the Persian corridor, and were now beyond the grasp of the Axis. This was the first large-scale operation of World War II by the Allies combining sea, land, and air forces. In the makeshift Allied planning of the war's early years, the invasion of Madagascar held a prominent strategic place.

Historian John Grehan has claimed that the British capture of Madagascar, before it could fall into Japanese hands, was so crucial to the war effort that it led to Japan's eventual downfall and defeat.

Free French General Paul Legentilhomme was appointed High Commissioner for Madagascar in December 1942 only to replace British administration. Like many colonies, Madagascar sought its independence from the French Empire following the war. In 1947, the island experienced the Malagasy Uprising, a costly revolution that was crushed in 1948. It was not until 26 June 1960, about twelve years later, that the Malagasy Republic successfully proclaimed its independence from France.

Campaign service in Madagascar did not qualify for the British and Commonwealth Africa Star. It was instead covered by the 1939–1945 Star.

== Order of battle ==
=== Allied forces ===
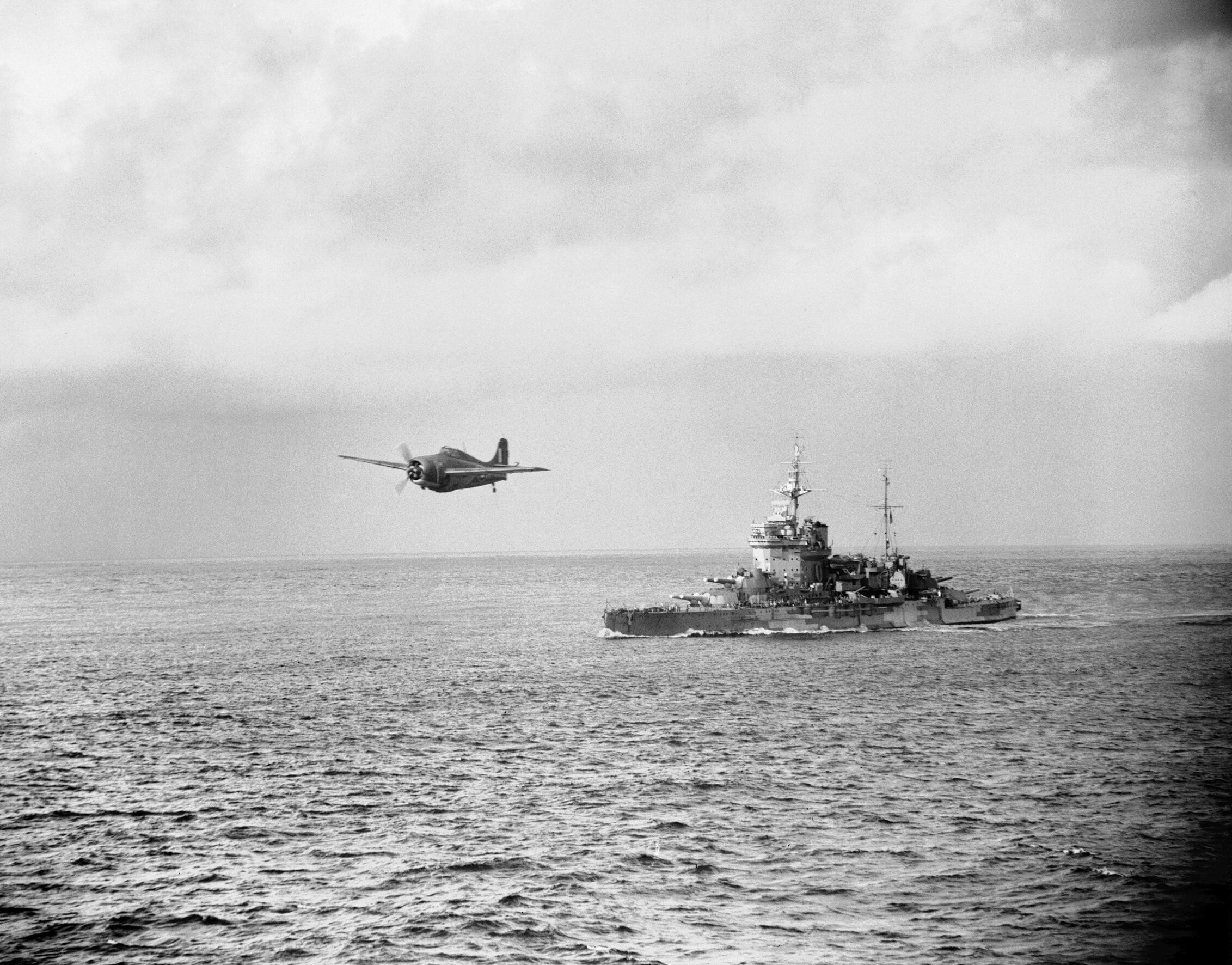
A Grumman Martlet of the Fleet Air Arm flying over HMS Warspite during the Madagascar operations

==== Naval forces ====
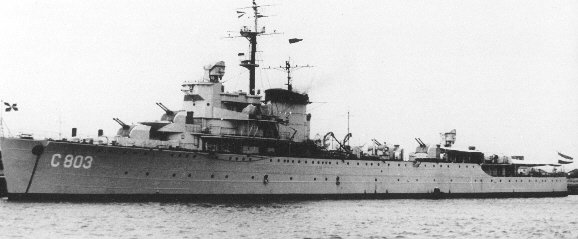
Jacob van Heemskerck, a Dutch cruiser involved in the operations off Madagascar

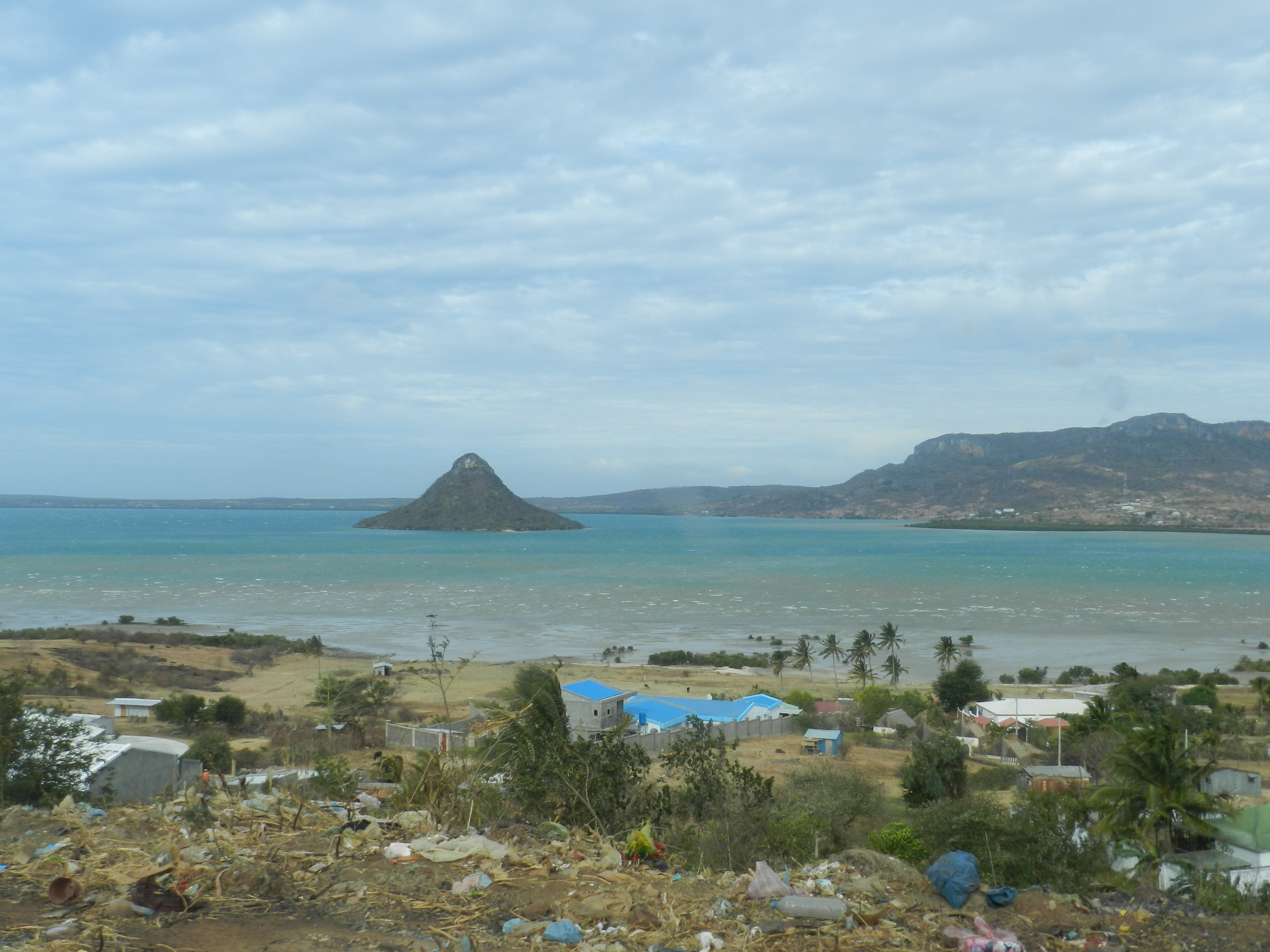
Modern-day view of the bay

Battleships
HMS Ramillies
Aircraft carriers
HMS Illustrious
HMS Indomitable
Cruisers
HMS Birmingham
HMS Dauntless
HMS Gambia
HMS Hermione
HMS Devonshire
HNLMS Jacob van Heemskerck
Minelayer
HMS Manxman
Monitor
HMS Erebus
Seaplane carrier
HMS Albatross
Destroyers
HMS Active
HMS Anthony
HMS Arrow
HMS Blackmore
HMS Duncan
HMS Fortune
HMS Foxhound
HMS Inconstant
HMS Hotspur
HMS Javelin
HMS Laforey
HMS Lightning
HMS Lookout
HMAS Napier
HMAS Nepal
HMAS Nizam
HMAS Norman
HMS Pakenham
HMS Paladin
HMS Panther
HNLMS Van Galen
HNLMS Tjerk Hiddes
Corvettes
HMS Freesia
HMS Auricula
HMS Nigella
HMS Fritillary
HMS Genista
HMS Cyclamen
HMS Thyme
HMS Jasmine
Minesweepers
HMS Cromer
HMS Poole
HMS Romney
HMS Cromarty
Assault transports
HMS Winchester Castle
HMS Royal Ulsterman
HMS Keren
HMS Karanja
MS Sobieski (Polish)
Special ships
HMS Derwentdale (LCA)
HMS Bachaquero (LST)
Troop ships
SS Oronsay
RMS Duchess of Atholl
RMS Franconia
Stores and MT ships
SS Empire Kingsley
M/S Thalatta (Norwegian)
SS Mahout
SS City of Hong Kong
SS Mairnbank
SS Martand II
Naval ground forces
Royal Naval Commandos
Royal Marines

==== Ground forces ====
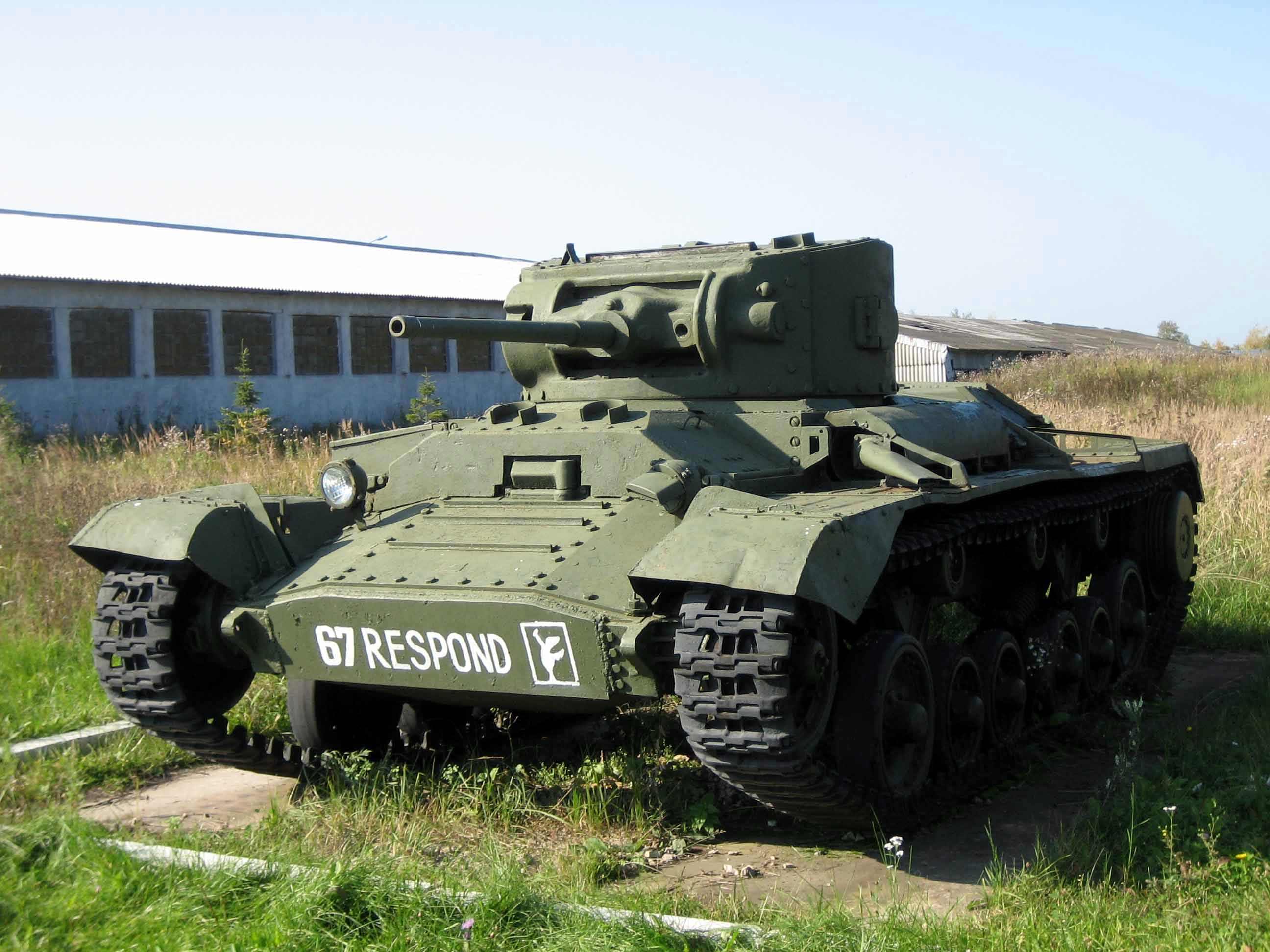
A Valentine tank of the type used during the invasion

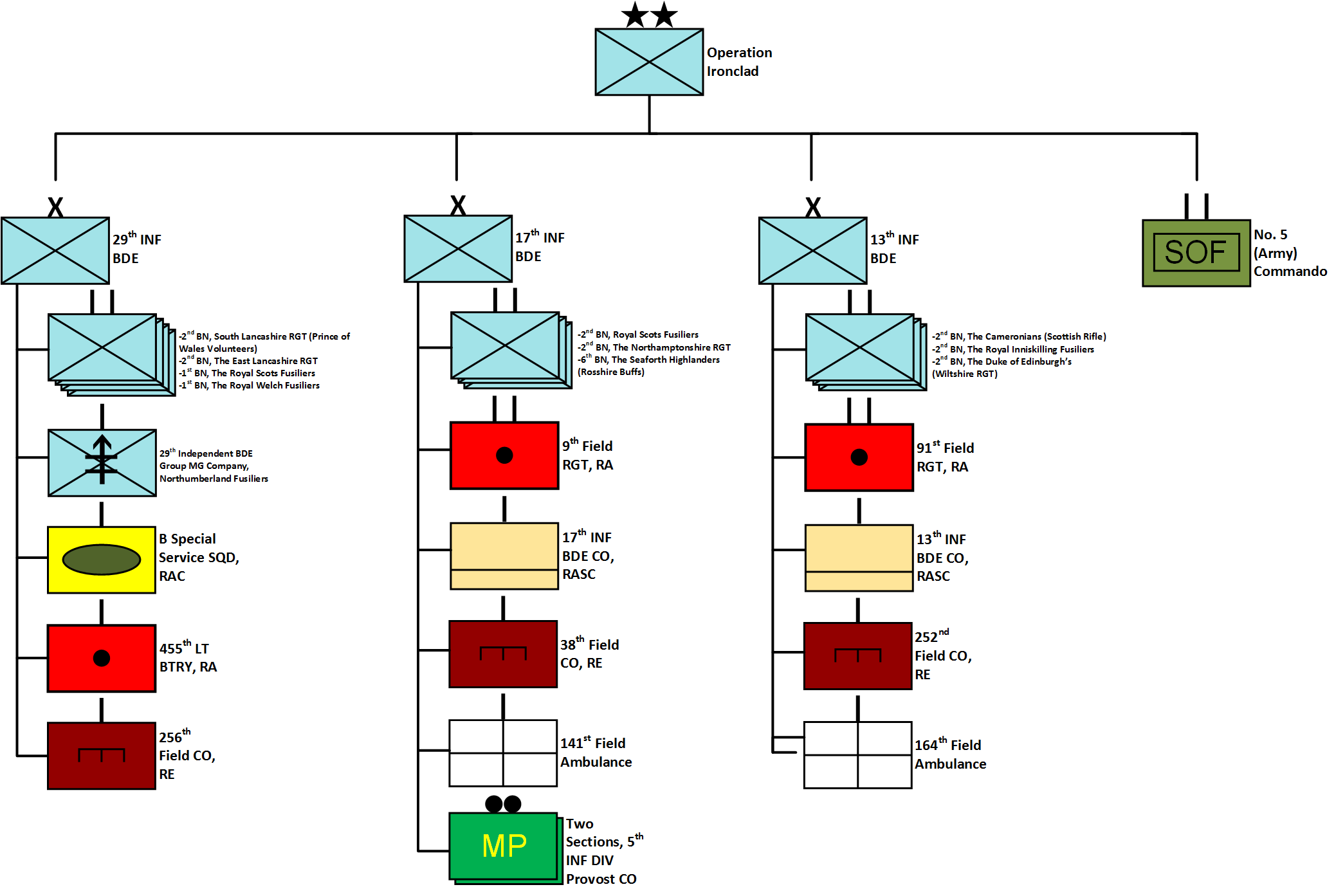
Organization of British ground forces for Operation Ironclad, during the invasion of Madagascar, 5 May 1942

29th Infantry Brigade (independent) arrived via amphibious landing near Diego-Suarez on 5 May 1942
2nd South Lancashire Regiment
2nd East Lancashire Regiment
1st Royal Scots Fusiliers
2nd Royal Welch Fusiliers
455th Light Battery (Royal Artillery)
MG company
'B' Special Service Squadron with 6 Valentine tanks
'C' Special Service Squadron with 6 Light Tank Mk VII Tetrarch
Commandos arrived via amphibious landing near Diego-Suarez on 5 May 1942
No. 5 Commando
British 17th Infantry Brigade Group (of 5th Division) landed near Diego-Suarez as second wave on 5 May 1942
2nd Royal Scots Fusiliers
2nd Northamptonshire Regiment
6th Seaforth Highlanders
9th Field Regiment (Royal Artillery)
British 13th Infantry Brigade (of 5th Division) landed near Diego-Suarez as third wave on 6 May 1942. Departed 19 May 1942 for India
2nd Cameronians
2nd Royal Inniskilling Fusiliers
2nd Wiltshire Regiment
East African Brigade Group arrived 22 June to replace 13 and 17 Brigades
South African 7th Motorised Brigade
1st City Regiment (Grahamstown)
Pretoria Regiment
Pretoria Highlanders
1st SA Armoured Car Commando
6th Field Regiment SA Artillery
88th Field Company SA Engineers
Rhodesian 27th Infantry Brigade arrived 8 August 1942; departed 29 June 1944
2nd Northern Rhodesia Regiment
3rd Northern Rhodesia Regiment
4th Northern Rhodesia Regiment
55th (Tanganyika) Light Battery
57th (East African) Field Battery

==== Fleet Air Arm ====
Aboard HMS Illustrious
881 Squadron – 12 Grumman Martlet Mk.II
882 Squadron – 8 Grumman Martlet Mk.II, 1 Fairey Fulmar
810 Squadron – 10 Fairey Swordfish
829 Squadron – 10 Fairey Swordfish
Aboard HMS Indomitable
800 Squadron – 8 Fairey Fulmar
806 Squadron – 4 Fairey Fulmar
880 Squadron – 6 Hawker Sea Hurricane Mk IA
827 Squadron – 12 Fairey Albacore
831 Squadron – 12 Fairey Albacore

=== Vichy France ===
==== Naval forces ====
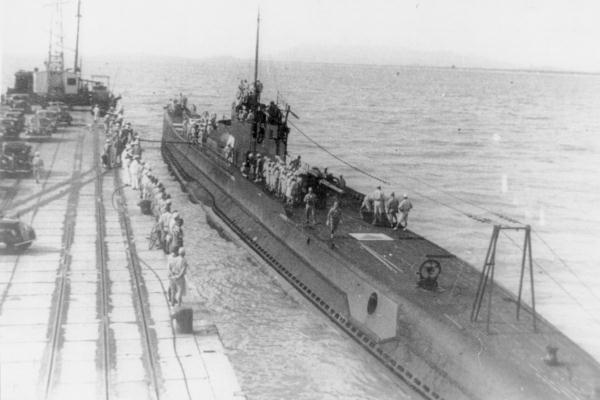
I-10 in Penang, 1942

Merchant Cruiser Bougainville 2
Sloop D'Entrecasteaux
Submarines
Bévéziers
Le Héros
Monge

==== Land forces ====
The following order of battle represents the Malagasy and Vichy French forces on the island directly after the initial Ironclad landings.

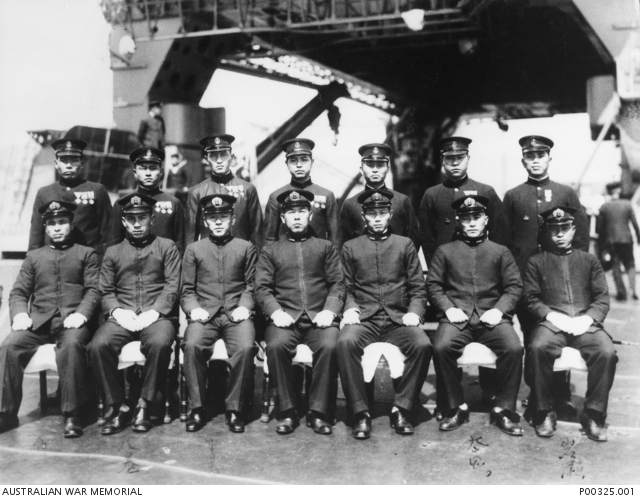
Members of the Japanese imperial navy midget submarine attack group, which included those who carried out the attacks on Diego-Suarez

Second Special Attack Unit

West coast
Two platoons of reservists and volunteers at Nossi-Bé
Two companies of the Régiment mixte malgache (RMM – Mixed Madagascar Regiment) at Ambanja
One battalion of the 1er RMM at Majunga
East coast
One battalion of the 1er RMM at Tamatave
One artillery section (65mm) at Tamatave
One company of the 1er RMM at Brickaville
Centre of the island
Three battalions of the 1er RMM at Tananarive
One motorised reconnaissance detachment at Tananarive
Emyrne battery at Tananarive
One artillery section (65mm) at Tananarive
One engineer company at Tananarive
One company of the 1er RMM at Mevatanana
One company of the Bataillon de tirailleurs malgaches (BTM – Malagasy Tirailleurs Battalion) at Fianarantsoa
South of the island
Other
One company of the BTM at Fort Dauphin
One company of the BTM at Tuléar

=== Japan ===
==== Naval forces ====
- Submarines I-10 (with reconnaissance aircraft), I-16, I-18 (damaged by heavy seas and arrived late), I-20
- Midget submarines M-16b, M-20b

== See also ==
- Force H
- Madagascar in World War II
