= Armand Annet =

French colonial governor (1888-1973)

- Born: 5 June 1888; Paris, France
- Died: 25 April 1973 (aged 84); Paris, France
- Occupation: Colonial Administrator

Armand Léon Annet (5 June 1888 – 25 April 1973) was a French colonial governor of various colonies in the French colonial empire.

== Biography ==
Armand Léon Annet was born in Paris in 1888, in Rue de Babylone.

Annet was Governor of French Somaliland from 1935 to 1937. He was Lieutenant-Governor of Dahomey from 1938 to 1940. In 1940, Annet sided with Vichy France after the Fall of France. As the Vichy Governor-General of Madagascar from 1941 to 1942, Annet was involved in the Battle of Madagascar. Starting on 5 May 1942, he defended the island with about 8,000 troops. On 5 November 1942, Annet surrendered his remaining forces near Ihosy, on the south of the island. By continuing to fight for 6 months he had become entitled to a higher pension. After the war, in 1947, he was convicted of indignité nationale.

Annet died in Paris in 1973.

== See also ==
- List of colonial governors of Dahomey
- List of colonial governors of Madagascar
