= Eighth Army (United Kingdom) =

World War II army in North Africa and Italy

Western Army Army of the Nile Eighth Army
- The Eighth Army's formation insignia
- Active: 10 September 1941 – 29 July 1945
- Country: United Kingdom
- Branch: British Army
- Type: Field army
- Engagements: North African campaign Italian campaign

The Eighth Army was a field army of the British Army during the Second World War. It was formed as the Western Army on 10 September 1941, in Egypt, before being renamed the Army of the Nile and then the Eighth Army on 26 September. It was created to better control the growing Allied force based in Egypt and to direct its efforts to lift the siege of Tobruk via Operation Crusader.

It later directed Allied forces through the remaining engagements of the Western Desert campaign, oversaw part of the Allied effort during the Tunisian campaign and finally led troops throughout the Italian campaign. During 1943, it made up part of the 18th Army Group before being assigned to the 15th Army Group (later, the Allied Armies in Italy).

Significant formations that the army controlled included the British V, X, XIII, and XXX Corps, as well as the I Canadian Corps and the II Polish Corps.

== Background ==
The Suez Canal, in Egypt, was seen as a vital link of the British Empire connecting Britain with its colonial possessions in the Far East, especially British India. It also held economic and prestigious importance. To maintain this, Egypt was occupied in 1882 and a protectorate was subsequently established. During the inter-war period, the Middle East and the canal gained further importance as oil production expanded and as aerial links between Britain and British India were developed. In 1935, British policy shifted to view Italy as the principal threat towards British interests in the Middle East, due to their colonial ambitions as well as their military build-up and the Second Italo-Ethiopian War. The Anglo-Egyptian treaty of 1936 followed, before tensions simmered with a joint declaration, on 2 January 1937, by Italy and Britain to maintain the status quo around the Mediterranean. Relations quickly deteriorated and British reinforcements were dispatched to Egypt. Troops were moved from near Cairo and from the canal zone to Mersa Matruh, 170 mi (270 km) west of Alexandria in the Western Desert, to be in a position to protect Egypt from an Italian invasion from their Libyan colony.

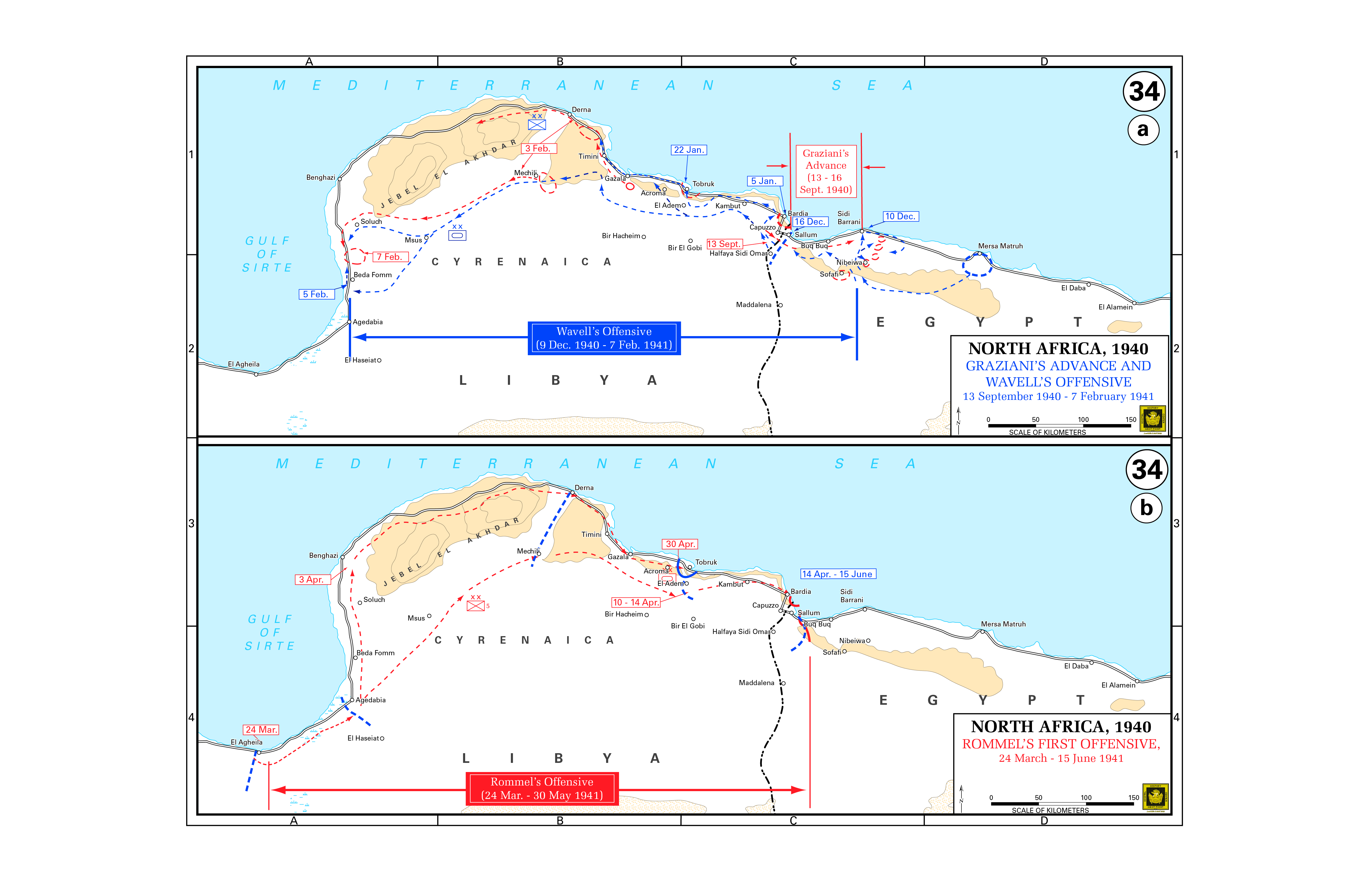
A map of the Western Desert, detailing battles and movements between 13 September 1940 – 30 May 1941 (enlargeable).

On 10 June 1940, Italy entered the Second World War. Later in the year, between 13 and 16 September, Italy conducted the Italian invasion of Egypt. A counterattack, Operation Compass, took place in December, which destroyed the Italian 10th Army and captured the Libyan province of Cyrenaica. The attack was undertaken by the Western Desert Force, which was renamed XIII Corps after the conclusion of the operation. After Operation Sonnenblume the dispatch of Axis reinforcements to Africa, Italo-German forces riposted in March 1941, which drove the main British body into Egypt and destroyed part of the 2nd Armoured Division. A sizeable Australian force was surrounded in the Libyan port of Tobruk. This led to the siege of Tobruk and required the bulk of the German and Italian troops to maintain and hindered further large Axis offensive operations. On 15 May, Operation Brevity was launched as British troops, from inside Egypt, attacked towards the Egyptian–Libyan border area. This minor effort failed to meet its objectives and ended the following day. Operation Skorpion a small German counterattack, at the end of the month, recaptured the ground lost during Brevity. Operation Battleaxe, which started on 15 June, was a determined two-day effort to advance from Egypt and lift the siege of Tobruk. Italian-German forces repulsed the assault and no terrain was gained. Geopolitical considerations followed, as pressure built on the British commanders to launch a new offensive to break the siege. These took account of the majority of the German military being involved in Operation Barbarossa the invasion of the Soviet Union and the need to show that British forces were doing their part in bringing about the defeat of the Axis powers. Closer to the front and after months of political debate, it was decided that the Australian garrison in Tobruk had to be relieved. This took place between September and October, as the Australians were gradually replaced by the British 70th Infantry Division which was shipped into the port.

== History ==
=== Formation ===
During 1941, XIII Corps was the primary British formation in Egypt. The process of forming a second, initially known as the Armoured Corps before being renamed XXX Corps (this corps would not become active until October 1941), had also started. Due to the increased size of the British forces in Egypt and the forming second corps, it was decided in September 1941, that a field army headquarters was needed to direct these formations. On 10 September, the Western Army headquarters was established in Cairo. The name was subsequently changed to the Army of the Nile, before being changed to the Eighth Army on 26 September. Winston Churchill, the British Prime Minister, sometimes referred to the army as the Western Desert Force.

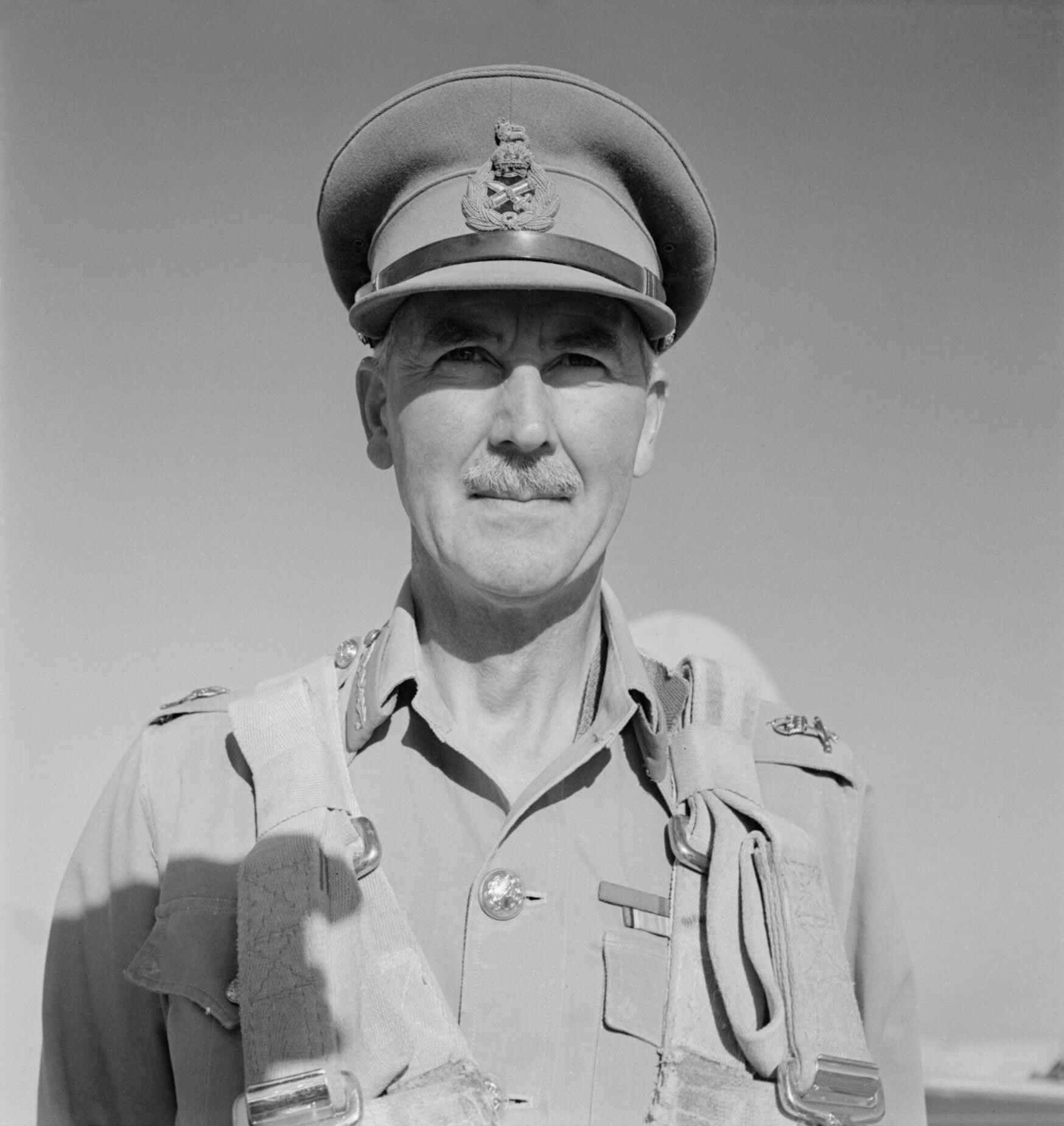
Alan Cunningham, after his appointment to command the Eighth Army

Churchill suggested General Henry Maitland Wilson for command of the army but the final decision was left in the hands of General Sir Claude Auchinleck the GOC Middle East Command who oversaw all British-led forces in the region. Auchinleck selected Lieutenant-General Alan Cunningham, who had led the British effort from Kenya during the East African campaign. On 29 August 1941, due to the success he had achieved, he was ordered to Egypt to take command of the forming Eighth Army, which he did on 24 September. The Eighth Army was responsible for operations in the Western Desert and was supported by the existing command, British Troops in Egypt, that controlled the lines of communication, the Egyptian anti-aircraft defences and internal security behind the front.

The 7th Armoured Division, which formed part of the army, was nicknamed the Desert Rats after the Jerboa, their choice of mascot and insignia. George Forty, a historian who has written about the division, commented that the fame of the 7th Armoured Division resulted in its nickname being "loosely attached to any member of the forces who served in the Western Desert". Robin Neillands, in his work on the Eighth Army, wrote "It is worth pointing out here that the term 'Desert Rat', though often used to describe any soldier of the Desert Army or the men who fought in Tobruk – the Australians have a 'Rats of Tobruk' Association – should strictly be applied only to the men of the British 7th Armoured Division".

=== Crusader to Gazala ===
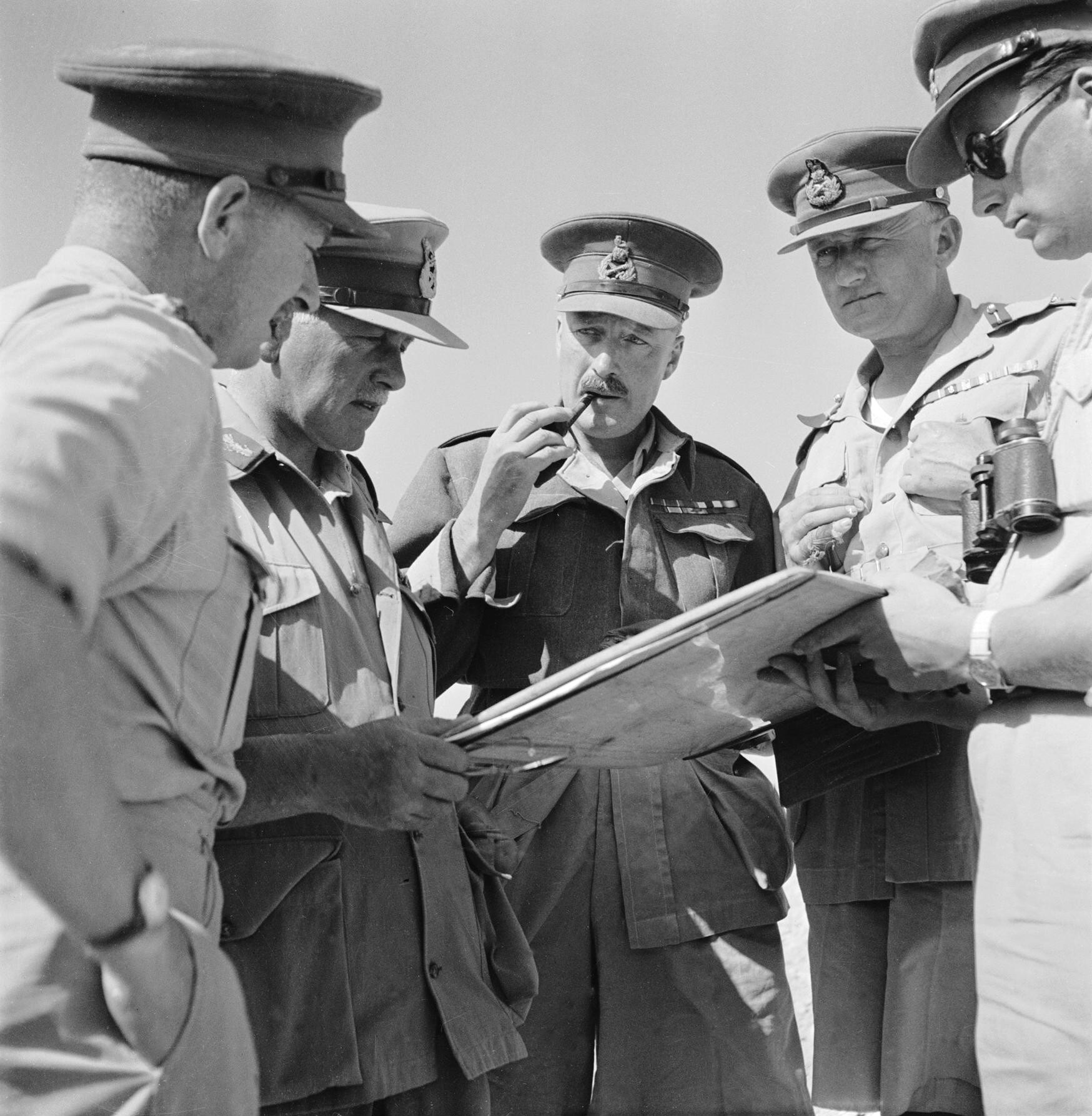
Neil Ritchie (center with pipe) who replaced Cunningham during Operation Crusader, pictured during the Battle of Gazala flanked by corps commanders.

One of the first tasks undertaken by the Eighth Army, with X Corps (Lieutenant-General William Holmes) that had recently arrived in Egypt, was to conduct preliminary work on defensive positions at El Alamein. This lasted until late October, when the corps moved to Syria and British Troops in Egypt took over responsibility. From his appointment, Cunningham closely worked with Auchinleck to formulate the Crusader plan, which was to retake Cyrenaica and lift the siege of Tobruk. The Eighth Army established forward supply bases, field maintenance centres and constructed a 160 mi (260 km) pipeline to provide water. On 18 November, the battle commenced. It saw the 118,000 men and 738 tanks of the Eighth Army, the main force coming from Egypt and also including the Tobruk garrison, engage the Italian-German force of 119,000 men and 552 tanks. The fighting started on 18 November and Crusader achieved its objectives by the end of the year.

On 25 November, after a German counterattack into Egypt during Crusader had been repulsed, Cunningham was dismissed by Auchinleck. His replacement was Auchinleck's deputy chief of the general staff, Major-General Neil Ritchie, who was chosen due to his familiarity with the Crusader plan. The official history of the campaign recorded that the decision was made due to Auchinleck perceiving Cunningham as being too defensive minded. This resulted in a loss of confidence over his "ability to press to the bitter end the offensive he had been ordered to continue". Evan McGilvray and Philip Warner, historians who have written about Auchinleck, added additional factors such as Auchinleck's concern that Cunningham was stressed, exhausted and had problems with his sight that would require time away from command. Michael Carver, who fought in the battle and was later a field marshal and historian, concurred with the health assessment. He also noted that while Cunningham was "an imaginative choice", it was later clear his "appointment was a mistake" due to his lack of experience and confidence in the mobile requirements of the fighting in North Africa. Neillands highlighted that Ritchie was thrust into a position where he, a major-general, was now charged with overseeing those who outranked him. This was compounded by a lack of experience in controlling formations or desert fighting and that for the ten-day period after his appointment, Auchinleck remained at Eighth Army headquarters and was effectively in command.

Following Crusader, Ritchie and Auchinleck planned Operation Acrobat, an attack to capture the remainder of Italian Libya, Tripolitania (potentially in conjunction with an Allied landing in French Morocco). In late January 1942, the Axis forces counterattacked. Ritchie initially dismissed the seriousness of the Axis move and Auchinleck deemed it wiser to yield some territory while the Eighth Army continued to build its logistical base for Acrobat. The 1st Armoured Division bore the brunt of the attack and was pushed back, while it covered the retreat of the remainder of the Eighth Army to Gazala where it established a defensive line. In February, Lieutenant-General Reade Godwin-Austen, the commander XIII Corps, tendered his resignation as he believed Ritchie had ignored his advice during the retreat. At Gazala, Ritchie planned a new offensive while supply bases were established and work was conducted to lengthen the supporting railroads into Libya. Auchinleck informed his superiors in the UK, that there was no timetable for such an attack, it would have to wait until sufficient tank strength had been established. A policy was also adopted that if forced to retreat, there would be no repeat of the siege of Tobruk. The same month, due to the Japanese entry into the war in December 1941, the 70th Infantry Division was withdrawn from the Eighth Army and sent to Asia. A warning that additional troops could be removed loomed over the army. Political pressure mounted for the Eighth Army to launch an offensive, which would support Malta and defeat the Axis powers in Africa prior to development of any potential Japanese threat to the Middle East and the army's supply lines; supply convoys ran from the UK, around the Cape of Good Hope, and then through the Indian Ocean to the Middle East.

In May, an Axis attack on the Eighth Army was expected although an optimistic attitude was held that it would be repulsed, and the Italian-German defeat would allow for the capture of the remainder of Cyrenaica. The Battle of Gazala started on 26 May and resulted in a defeat for the Eighth Army. This included the Axis capture of Tobruk and 32,000 men (following a last-minute change in plans and the establishment of a garrison that included the 2nd South African Infantry Division) and the Eighth Army was forced to retreat. Carver argued that Ritchie was not responsible for the loss of the battle, that was shouldered by his subordinates "for the dilatory fashion in which they exercised command". Niall Barr, who wrote about the desert fighting in 1942, stated that Richie was too slow to react at key moments and that his "passivity doomed Bir Hakeim to slow strangulation and capture", which contributed to the defeat. The official history explained this was the result of Auchinleck's influence over the Eighth Army and Ritchie. The latter, with no experience in desert warfare or command, retained the mentality of his prior positions rather than asserting his own authority and consulted with Auchinleck before taking action. This position is echoed by David French, who noted that Richie's subordinates believed Auchinleck held sway, that their orders came directly from Auchinleck without Richie making changes based on local conditions; Ritchie held lengthy conferences that did not deliver precise instructions. The Eighth Army retreated into Egypt with the intent to rebuild. Barr noted that this could have worked, had the Italian-German forces maintained their strategy of Operation Herkules, the capture of Malta. Generalleutnant Erwin Rommel, commander of the Panzer Army Africa, made the decision to pursue the Eighth Army, which turned the retreat into a rout and made any attempt to fight a delaying battle on the frontier impossible. As the army retreated further, Ritchie was determined to fight the final battle of the campaign at Mersa Matruh.

=== Retreat into Egypt ===
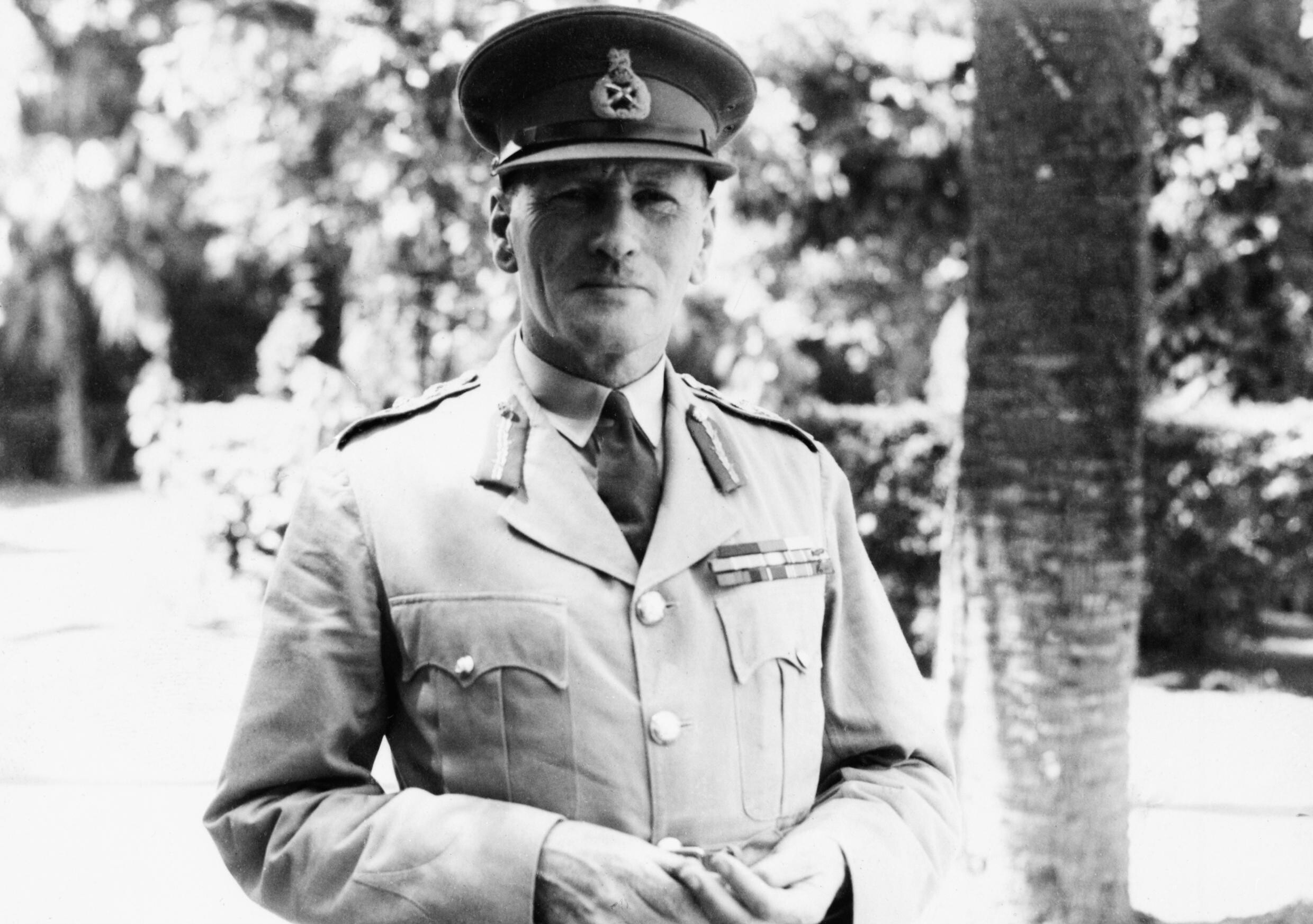
Auchinleck, commander-in-chief Middle East Command, who eventually took over direct command of Eighth Army in 1942

On 25 June, Auchinleck decided to take direct control of the Eighth Army; a move that was supported by Churchill, who had called for such a change before Gazala. This also saw the rise in prominence of Major-General Eric Dorman-Smith, Auchinleck's Middle East Command chief of staff. (Note: On assuming control of the army, Auchinleck suggested that General Harold Alexander replace him as commander-in-chief of Middle East Command. This suggestion was rejected to avoid further political turmoil stemming from the defeat of the Eighth Army.) While Auchinleck and Dorman-Smith had a close working relationship and understood one another, the latter held an unofficial position within the Eighth Army. He produced battle plans that Auchinleck used but was under no responsibility to inform other members of the headquarters of these ideas. Auchinleck froze out members of the army's headquarters in favour of Dorman-Smith, resulting in confusion and animosity within the headquarters and with other officers.

Auchinleck decided that a final battle would not take place at Mersa Matruh and ordered the reorganisation of the Eighth Army's divisions. He wanted them split between forward and rear elements. The former would contain one infantry brigade and all of the divisional artillery. They were to be mobile enough to allow independent operations back and forth across the desert, while the rear element would contain the remainder of the infantry that could not be motorised and would take up static positions. This was initially intended to be along the Libyan–Egyptian frontier, before they were directed to El Alamein to dig-in. Ian Playfair, the author of the official history, highlighted that British doctrine stated that during a retreat, a running battle was to be avoided and thus Auchinleck's changes – in the midst of a retreat and fighting – went against establish practice. Lieutenant-General Bernard Freyberg, commander of the 2nd New Zealand Division, was able to resist Auchinleck's desired changes as his division was politically protected; any change required the consent of the New Zealand government. (Note: The division had its transport deficiencies made up by removing vehicles from the 10th Indian Infantry Division. This allowed two brigades to be moved to the front, after the division's transfer from Syria. The third brigade, as the result of a lack of transport, was left at El Alamein.)

On 14 June, X Corps was ordered from Syria to reinforce the Eighth Army. It assembled near Mersa Matruh on 22 June and handed over the tanks of the 8th Armoured Brigade to the 1st Armoured Division; the brigade was sent to the canal area to rebuild. Four days later, the Battle of Mersa Matruh began. While there were some tactical successes, by the evening of the next day, the Eighth Army started to withdraw. Due to communication breakdowns and tactical changes, the New Zealand Division was surrounded and had to fight its way out. X Corps was out of radio contact and were not informed of the withdrawal until 28 June, when they were able to escape although due to the loss of equipment and unit cohesion its divisions were in need of rest and refitting following the battle.

=== The battles of El Alamein ===
By 30 June, the vanguard of the Axis forces made contact with the Eighth Army at El Alamein. This new position offered a stronger defensive position, with its northern flank protected by the Mediterranean coast and by the Qattara Depression impassable salt marshes 40 mi (64 km) inland. While preliminary defensive work had taken place, which included the creation of a water pipeline and the laying of minefields, it was not until the arrival of the bulk of the Eighth Army that major improvements were made. While Auchinleck intended to stop the Axis offensive here, contingency plans were drawn up to conduct a fighting withdrawal to the Suez Canal. A scorched earth policy was considered and dismissed but a list of targets to be destroyed in the event of a retreat was established. These included communication, power, transport and storage facilities, as well as oil installations and supplies. Flooding of the Nile Delta was also considered, as a last resort and after a position beyond the Suez Canal had been established. Over the course of July, the Eighth Army fought the First Battle of El Alamein during which the Axis attacks were halted but Auchinleck's counter-attacks were also stopped. The campaign official history noted that following the final failed counter-attack, "Auchinleck then decided that he must make a long pause to rest, reorganize, and re-train his sadly battered army". In late July, Auchinleck appointed Brigadier Freddie de Guingand as the army chief of staff.

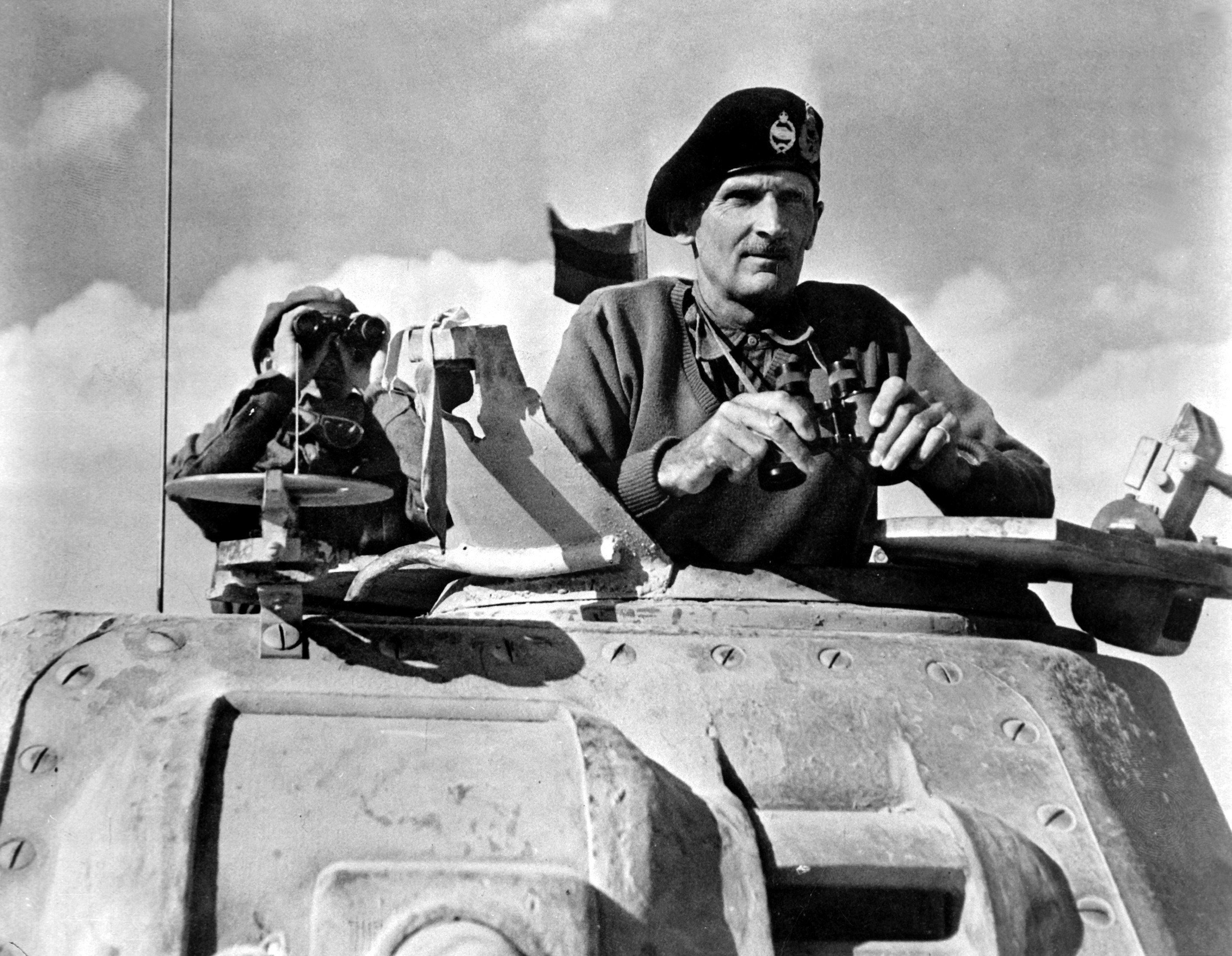
Montgomery during the Second Battle of El Alamein

The fighting in North Africa had caused concern with the British public and in the United States where Churchill had just visited to conduct the Second Washington Conference. This meeting finalised Allied policy for the following two years, there would be no Operation Sledgehammer a landing in German-occupied France and Operation Torch, a landing in French North Africa, was authorised to be conducted before the end of 1942. Case Blue the German advance into Caucasus as well as the Japanese threat influenced Auchinleck's thinking on the disposition of his theatre-wide forces, including the Eighth Army. The Chief of the Imperial General Staff, General Alan Brooke and Churchill arrived in Egypt in July, en route to Moscow. They emphasised the need to defeat the Axis forces in Egypt and Libya, as this would allow troops to be transferred elsewhere in the Middle East if German or Japanese forces prevailed on the other fronts.

In a private meeting between Auchinleck, Dorman-Smith and Churchill, Auchinleck stated a new offensive was not possible until at least September and overruled suggestions of immediate small-scale attacks. After visits to several Eighth Army divisions and meetings with various high-ranking officers, Churchill decided to make changes on 6 August. This included replacing Auchinleck with General Harold Alexander as commander-in-chief of Middle East Command, Dorman-Smith being sent back to Britain and the decision to appoint a new Eighth Army commander. Brooke suggested Lieutenant-General Bernard Montgomery, but Churchill preferred Lieutenant-General William Gott, who had been in action from the start of the Western Desert campaign.

On the following day, Gott was killed after his aircraft was shot down while travelling to Cairo. Barr and Playfair both argue that Gott was worn out from the prolonged campaign and would not have been the person to rejuvenate the Eighth Army. Montgomery arrived and assumed command on 15 August. Alexander and Montgomery made sweeping changes to commands, reversed Auchinleck's changes to the divisions, and took action to rebuild the morale of the troops. The various changes were dubbed the "fortnight of confusion" by Dorman-Smith.

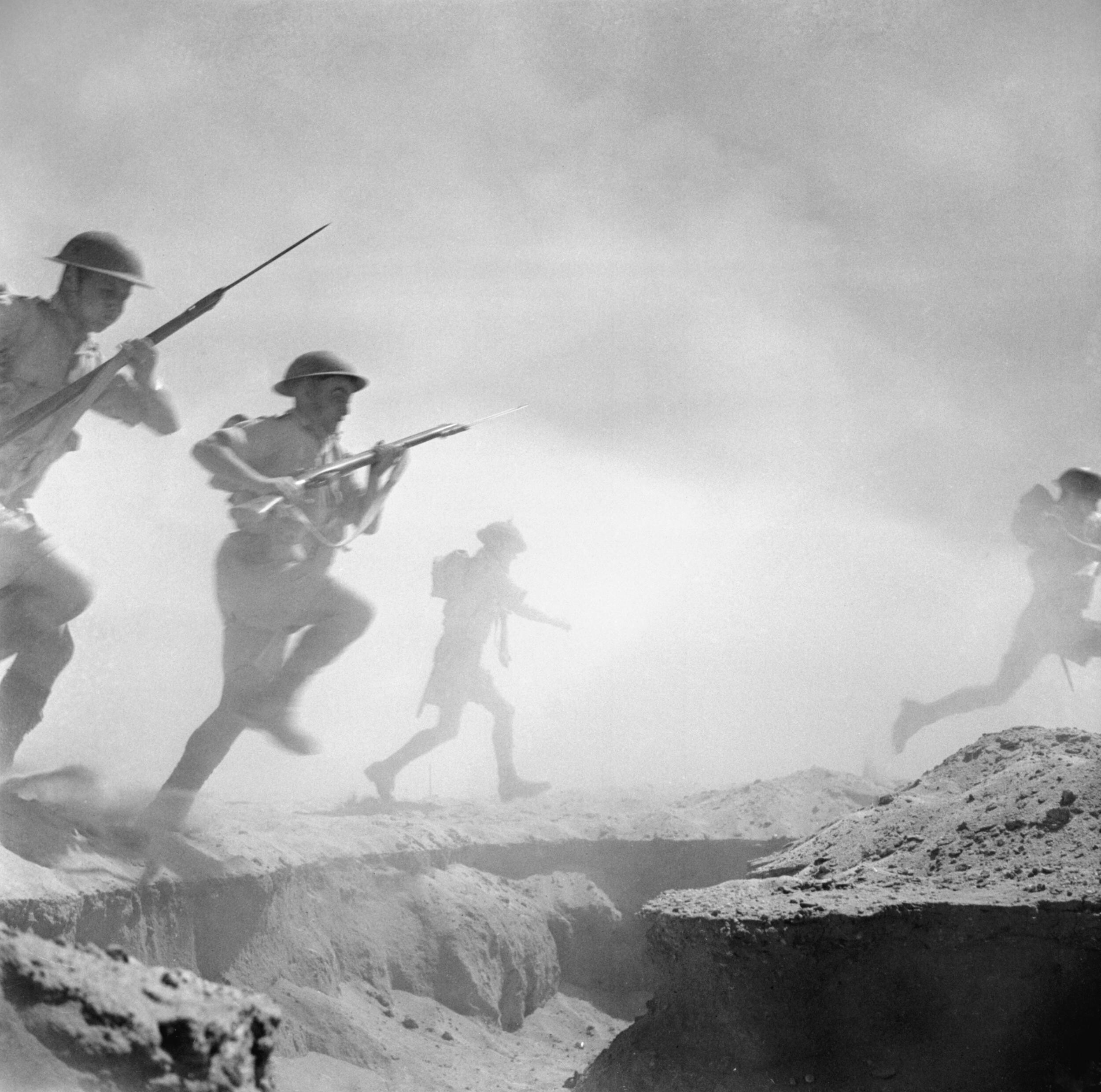
Posed action photo of British soldiers, portraying an attack during the battle.

Barr highlighted that the "fortnight of confusion" has generally been overstated and the Eighth Army was rather unscathed by the command changes. While it was a political necessity for Montgomery to distance himself from his predecessors, planning that Auchinleck, Dorman-Smith, Gott and de Guingand (who retained his position) had developed for defensive and offensive operations were retained and laid the groundwork for the following two battles at el Alamein. To address morale, Montgomery made a determined and deliberate effort to appeal to the troops. He delivered pep talks to groups of soldiers, was open to discuss policy with the rank and file and used these opportunities to disperse the Rommel myth. In August, the Eighth Army established its first medical center for soldiers suffering from battle exhaustion, where they could rest for short periods.

Churchill returned to Egypt in late August, following the Moscow conference and spent two days with the Eighth Army culminating with his report that there had been "a complete change of atmosphere" within the army. At the end of August and stretching into September, the Eighth Army defeated the next Axis offensive, the Battle of Alam el Halfa. This was followed, in November, by the Eighth Army's offensive, the Second Battle of El Alamein that resulted in the Axis defeat and a pursuit across Libya to Tunisia.

=== Tunisia ===
After the chase across Libya, the Eighth Army engaged in the Battle of the Mareth Line on the Tunisian border in February 1943, where it then came under the control of 18th Army Group. The army outflanked the Mareth defences in March 1943 and after further fighting alongside the First Army, the other 18th Army Group component, which had been conducting the Tunisian campaign since November 1942, the Axis forces in North Africa surrendered in May 1943.

=== Italy ===
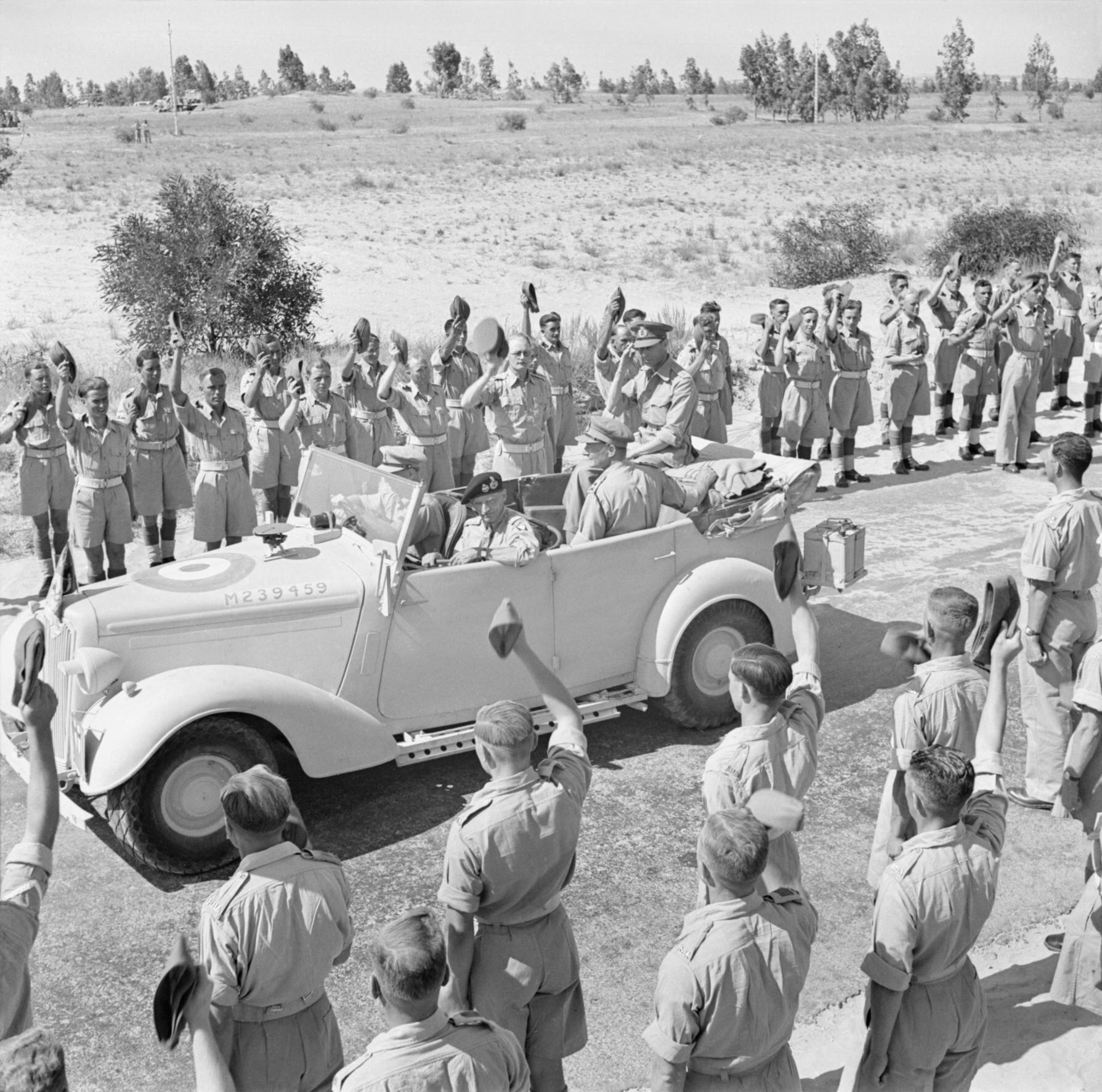
HM King George VI rides with General Montgomery in a staff car between lines of cheering troops during his first visit to Tripoli, 21 June 1943.

The Eighth Army then participated in the Italian Campaign which began with the Allied invasion of the island of Sicily, code-named Operation Husky. When the Allies subsequently invaded mainland Italy, elements of the Eighth Army landed in the 'toe' of Italy in Operation Baytown and at Taranto in Operation Slapstick. After linking its left flank with the U.S. Fifth Army, led by General Mark W. Clark, which had landed at Salerno on the west coast of Italy south of Naples, the Eighth Army continued fighting its way up Italy on the eastern flank of the Allied forces. Together these two armies made up the Allied Armies in Italy (later redesigned 15th Army Group), under General Sir Harold Alexander.

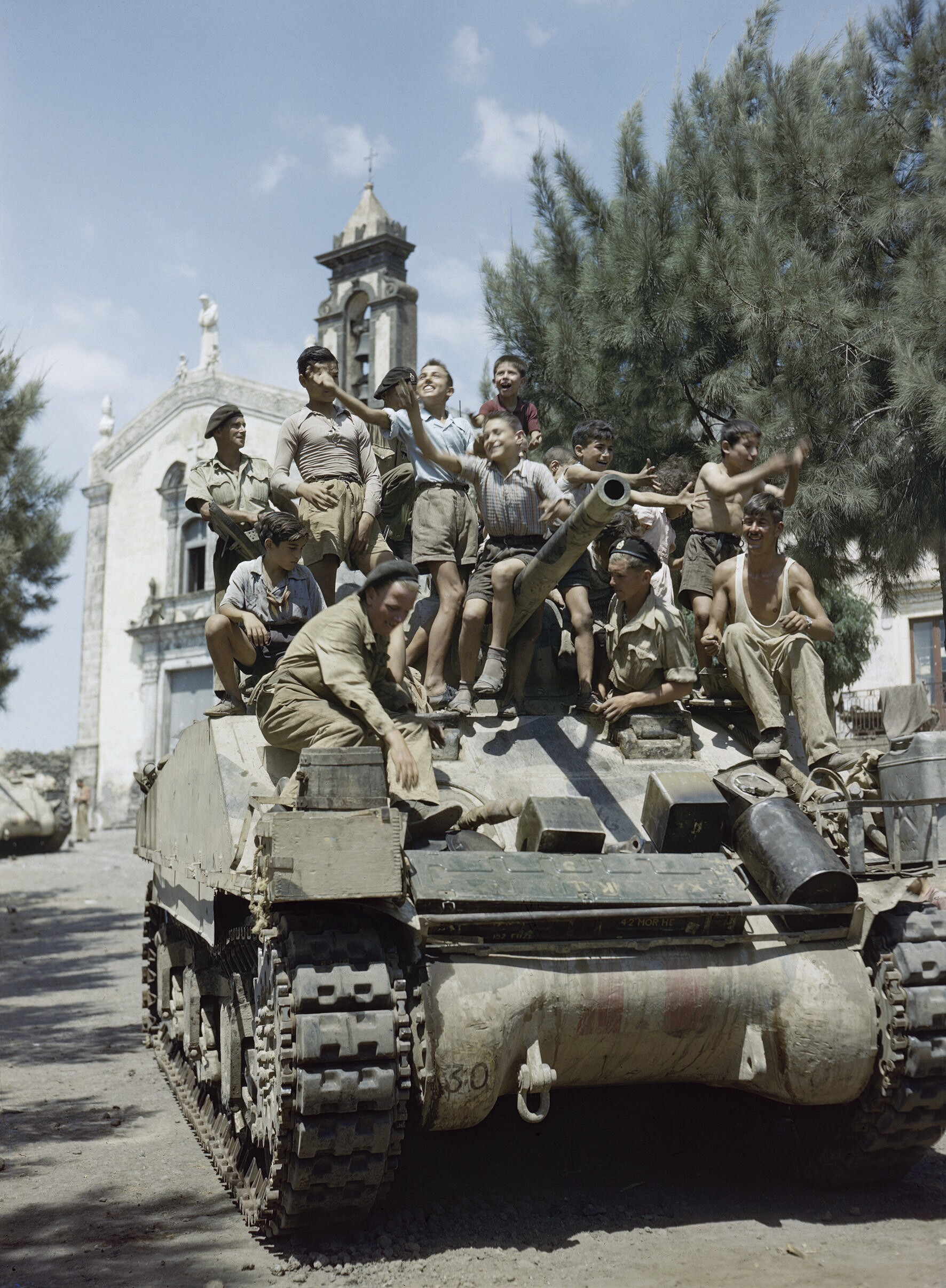
Tanks of the County of London Yeomanry, part of the British 4th Armoured Brigade, of the Eighth Army in the village of Belpasso near Catania in Sicily, with local children on board, August 1943.

At the end of 1943, General Montgomery was transferred to Britain to begin preparations for Operation Overlord. Command of the Eighth Army was given to Lieutenant-General Oliver Leese, previously the commander of XXX Corps, which was being returned to England.

Following three unsuccessful attempts in early 1944 by the U.S. Fifth Army to break through the German defensive positions known to the Allies as the Winter Line, the Eighth Army was covertly switched from the Adriatic coast in April 1944 to concentrate all forces, except the V Corps, on the western side of the Apennine Mountains alongside the U.S. Fifth Army in order to mount a major offensive with them. This fourth Battle of Monte Cassino was successful with the Eighth Army breaking into central Italy and the Fifth Army entering Rome in early June.

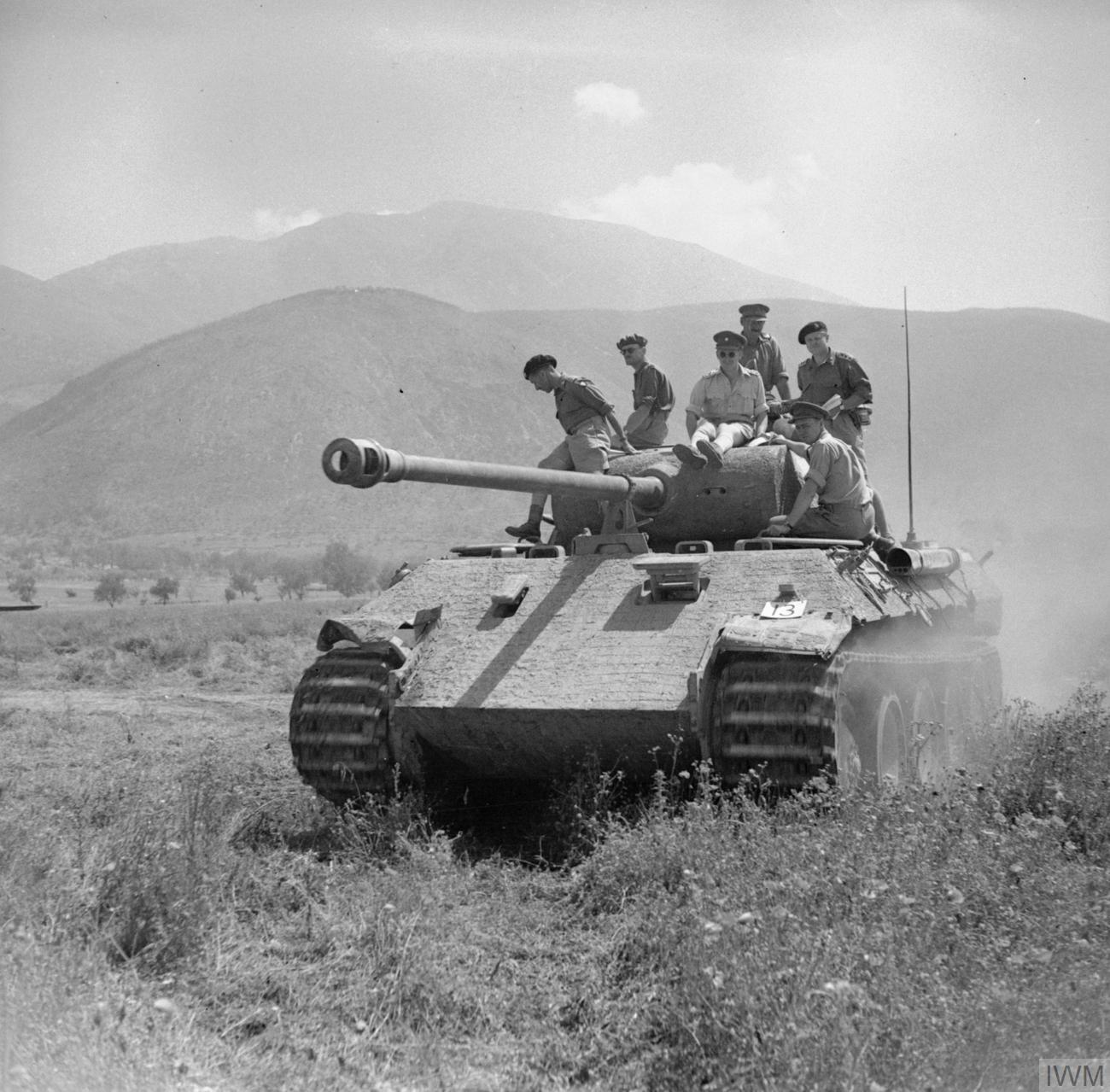
Lieutenant-General Sir Oliver Leese, GOC Eighth Army, and other officers ride on a captured German PzKpfw V Panther tank during a display of enemy equipment, 2 June 1944.

After the Allied capture of Rome, the Eighth Army continued the fight northwards through central Italy to capture Florence. The end of the summer campaign found Allied forces butting up against the Gothic Line. The Eighth Army returned to the Adriatic coast and succeeded in forcing the Gothic line defences, but ultimately the Allied forces could not break into the Po valley before the onset of winter forced an end to serious offensive operations. During October, Leese was reassigned to South East Asia Command, and Lieutenant-General Sir Richard L. McCreery, who had previously commanded X Corps, replaced him.

The final offensive in Italy saw the Eighth Army back in action. Working in conjunction with the U.S. Fifth Army, now commanded by Lucian K. Truscott, on its left flank, it cut off and destroyed, (during April), large parts of the opposing Army Group C defending Bologna and then made a rapid advance through northeast Italy and into Austria. Problems occurred where British and Yugoslavian forces met. Josip Broz Tito's forces were intent on securing control of the area of Venezia Giulia. They arrived before British forces and were very active in trying to prevent the establishment of military government in the manner that had applied to most of the rest of Italy. They even went as far as to restrict supplies through to the British zone of occupation in Austria and tried to take over part of that country as well. On 2 May 1945, the 2nd New Zealand Division of the Eighth Army liberated Trieste, and that same day, the Yugoslav Fourth Army, together with Slovene 9th Corpus NOV entered the town. During the fighting on the Italian Front the Eighth Army had, from 3 September 1943 until 2 May 1945, suffered 123,254 casualties.

=== Aftermath ===
At the end of the war, the army moved into Austria and became part of the Allied-occupation force. On 29 July 1945, the army was disbanded and its forces were used to form the command British Troops Austria. The new command maintained the gold crusader cross insignia of the Eighth Army.

== General officer commanding ==
General officer commanding
Appointment date	Rank	General officer commanding
24 September 1941	Lieutenant-General	Alan Cunningham
26 November 1941	Lieutenant-General (Acting)	Neil Ritchie
25 June 1942	General	Sir Claude Auchinleck
15 August 1942	Lieutenant-General	Bernard Montgomery
30 December 1943	Lieutenant-General	Oliver Leese
1 October 1944	Lieutenant-General	Richard McCreery

== Veterans ==
After the war, veterans from the Eighth Army organised Annual Reunions at the Royal Albert Hall. Then, in the late 1970s, the Eighth Army Veterans Association was formed. At the height of its membership, there were over 35 branches, with a particular strength in the North West of the UK.

== Order of battle ==
- Crusader
- Gazala
- Alam el Halfa
- Second Battle of El Alamein
- Mareth Line
- Wadi Akarit
- Invasion of Sicily
- Invasion of Italy
- Second Battle of Monte Cassino
- Diadem
- Moro River Campaign
- Gothic Line
- 1945 Spring offensive

== See also ==
- British military history of World War II
- Jewish Brigade
- John Whiteley
- William Ramsden
- The Third Man

== Notes ==
Footnotes

Citations
