= Axis capture of Tobruk =

1942 battle during the Western Desert Campaign of World War II

- Part of Battle of Gazala during the Second World War
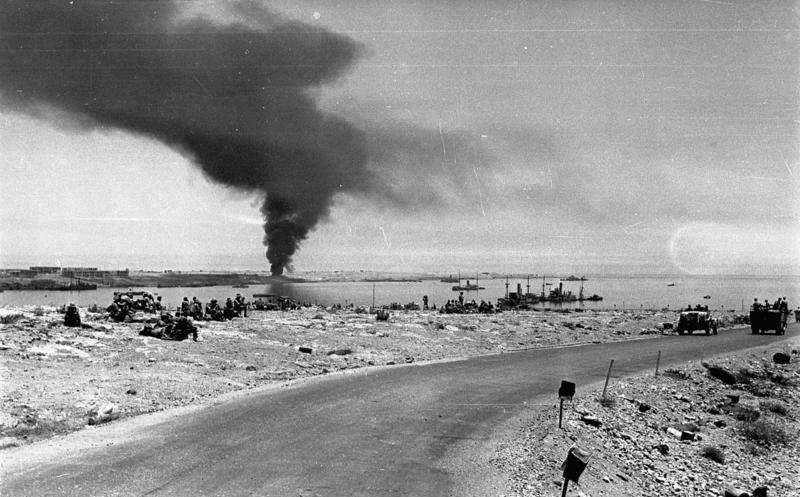
- The road from Bardia to Tobruk on 21 June 1942 with British prisoners of war on the left, sunken ships in the harbour and smoke over the port.
| Date | 17–21 June 1942 |
| Location | Tobruk, Libya 32°04′34″N 23°57′41″E |
| Result | Axis victory |

Belligerents
| Germany; Italy | United Kingdom; India; South Africa |

Commanders and leaders
| (Nazi Germany) Erwin Rommel; (Nazi Germany) Walter Nehring; (Kingdom of Italy) Ettore Baldassarre; (Kingdom of Italy) Enea Navarini; (Kingdom of Italy) Benvenuto Gioda | (United Kingdom) Neil Ritchie; (United Kingdom) William Gott; (Union of South Africa) Hendrik Klopper |

Strength
| Deutsches Afrika Korps; XX Corpo d'Armata; XXI Corpo d'Armata; X Corpo d'Armata | 35,000 troops |

Casualties and losses
| c. 3,360 | 33,000 taken prisoner |

The Axis capture of Tobruk, also known as the Fall of Tobruk and the Second Battle of Tobruk (17–21 June 1942) was part of the Western Desert campaign in Libya during the Second World War. The battle was fought by the Panzerarmee Afrika (Armata Corazzata Africa in Italian), a German–Italian military force in North Africa which included the Afrika Korps (Generalleutnant Erwin Rommel), against the British Eighth Army (General Neil Ritchie) which comprised contingents from Britain, India, South Africa and other Allied nations.

Axis forces had conducted the Siege of Tobruk for eight months in 1941 before its defenders, who had become an emblem of resistance, were relieved in December. Claude Auchinleck, the commander-in-chief Middle East Command, had decided not to defend Tobruk for a second time, due to the cost of bringing supplies in by sea; its minefields and barbed wire had been stripped for use in the Gazala Line to the west. By mid-1942 the Desert Air Force had been forced to move to airfields in Egypt, taking most of them beyond the range of Tobruk. About a third of all garrison personnel were non-combatant or support troops and many of the fighting troops were inexperienced. Lieutenant-General William Gott, the commander of XIII Corps, was withdrawn from Tobruk and on 15 June 1942, five days before the Axis attack. The new commander of the 2nd South African Division, Major-General Hendrik Klopper, was given command of the garrison. An immense stock of supplies had been accumulated around the port for Operation Acrobat but the Axis had forestalled this with Operation Venice (Unternehmen Venezia) and the Battle of Gazala began on 26 May 1942.

The Eighth Army was defeated in the Battle of Gazala and was driven eastwards toward the Egyptian border, leaving Tobruk isolated. The Prime Minister, Winston Churchill, placed great store on the symbolic value of Tobruk; an exchange of ambiguous signals between Churchill and Auchinleck led to the garrison being surrounded, rather than evacuated as intended. On 20 June the Panzerarmee Afrika attacked Tobruk with massed air support, penetrated a weak spot on the eastern defensive perimeter and captured the port. Much of the garrison on the western perimeter had not been attacked but they were cut off from their supplies and transport, without the means to escape from Tobruk. The majority had to surrender and 33,000 prisoners were taken.

The surrender was the second-largest capitulation by the British Army in the war, after the fall of Singapore in February 1942. The loss of Tobruk came as a severe blow to the British leadership and precipitated a political crisis in Britain. The United States expedited the dispatch of supplies and equipment to the Middle East. Rommel persuaded the Axis commanders that the supplies captured at Tobruk and the disorganised state of the British forces would enable the Axis easily to occupy Egypt and the Suez Canal. Operation Herkules, the Axis invasion of the island of Malta, was postponed and the Axis air forces instead supported the pursuit into Egypt, which suffered severe supply constraints as the Panzerarmee Afrika receded from its bases. The Axis advance was halted at the First Battle of Alamein in July 1942.

A British Court of Inquiry was held in absentia later in the year, which exonerated Klopper and ascribed the defeat to failures among the British high command. Only seven copies of the verdict were circulated, one being transmitted to General Jan Smuts on 2 October 1942. The findings were kept secret until after the war, which did little to restore the reputation of Klopper or his troops.

== Background ==
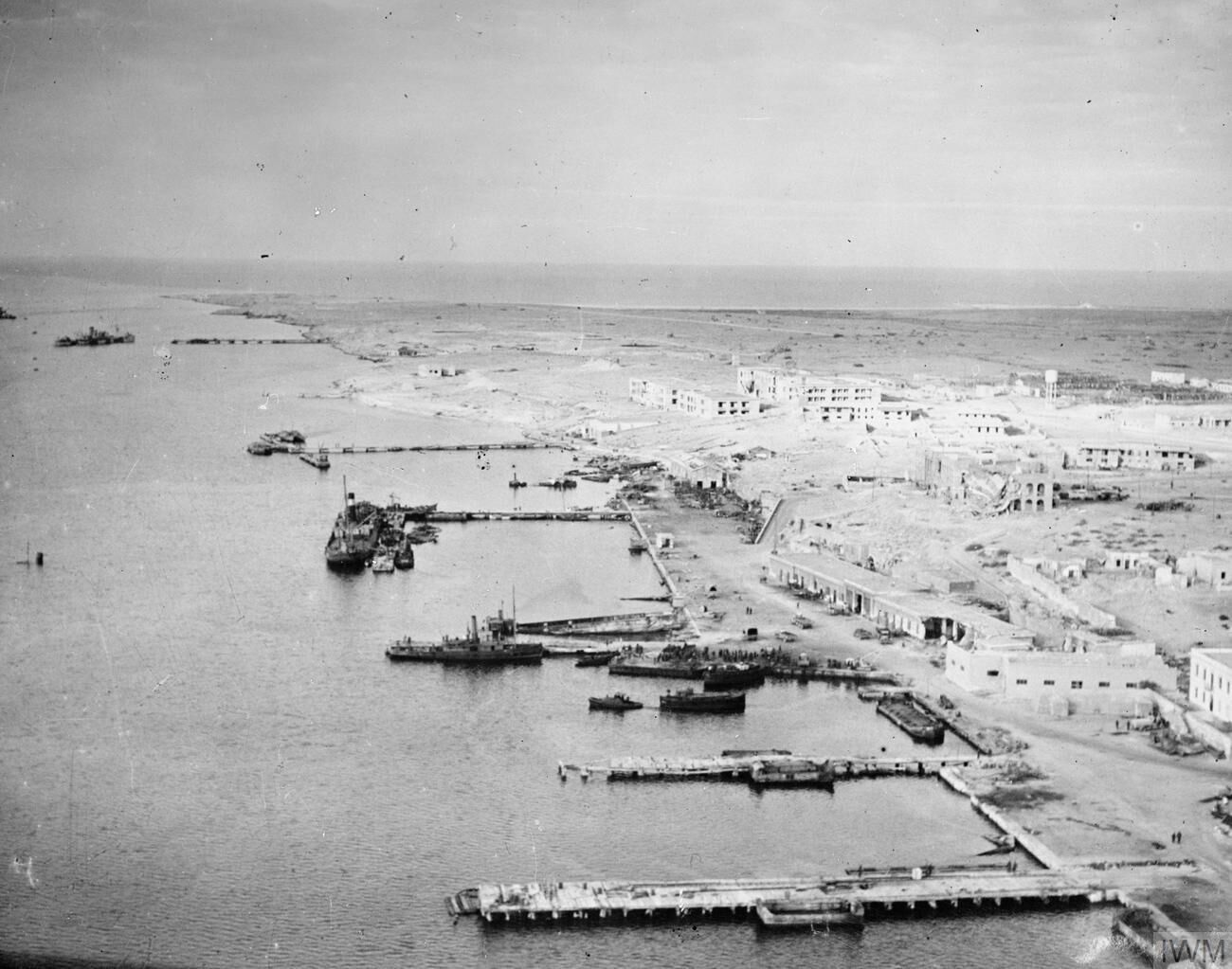
Aerial photograph of the port of Tobruk during the 1941 siege

The small port of Tobruk in Italian Cyrenaica had been fortified by the Italians from 1935. Behind two old outlying forts, they constructed a novel fortification, consisting of a double line of concrete-lined trenches 54 km (34 mi) long, connecting 128 weapons pits protected by concealed anti-tank ditches but the fortifications lacked overhead protection and there was no defence in depth. Tobruk was captured by Australian forces in January 1941 during Operation Compass, the first large Allied military operation of the Western Desert Campaign. Following the arrival of the German Afrika Korps commanded by Erwin Rommel in Operation Sonnenblume in March, Axis forces retook much of the lost territory in Cyrenaica; Tobruk was cut off and besieged between April and December 1941.

Using the Italian defences, ill-organised attacks by Axis forces were defeated by the 30,000-strong Australian garrison (replaced in September by a British and Allied force), allowing time for the fortifications to be improved. The Allied occupation of Tobruk was a threat to the Axis communications. It denied them the use of the port and it tied down four Italian divisions and three German battalions (a force twice the size of the garrison). During 1941, supplied from the sea and surviving successive Axis assaults, the defence of Tobruk became a symbol of the British war effort. The relief of Tobruk was the object of Operation Brevity in May and Operation Battleaxe in June, both of which failed. Operation Crusader in November and December 1941 raised the siege and forced the Axis out of Cyrenaica into Tripolitania.

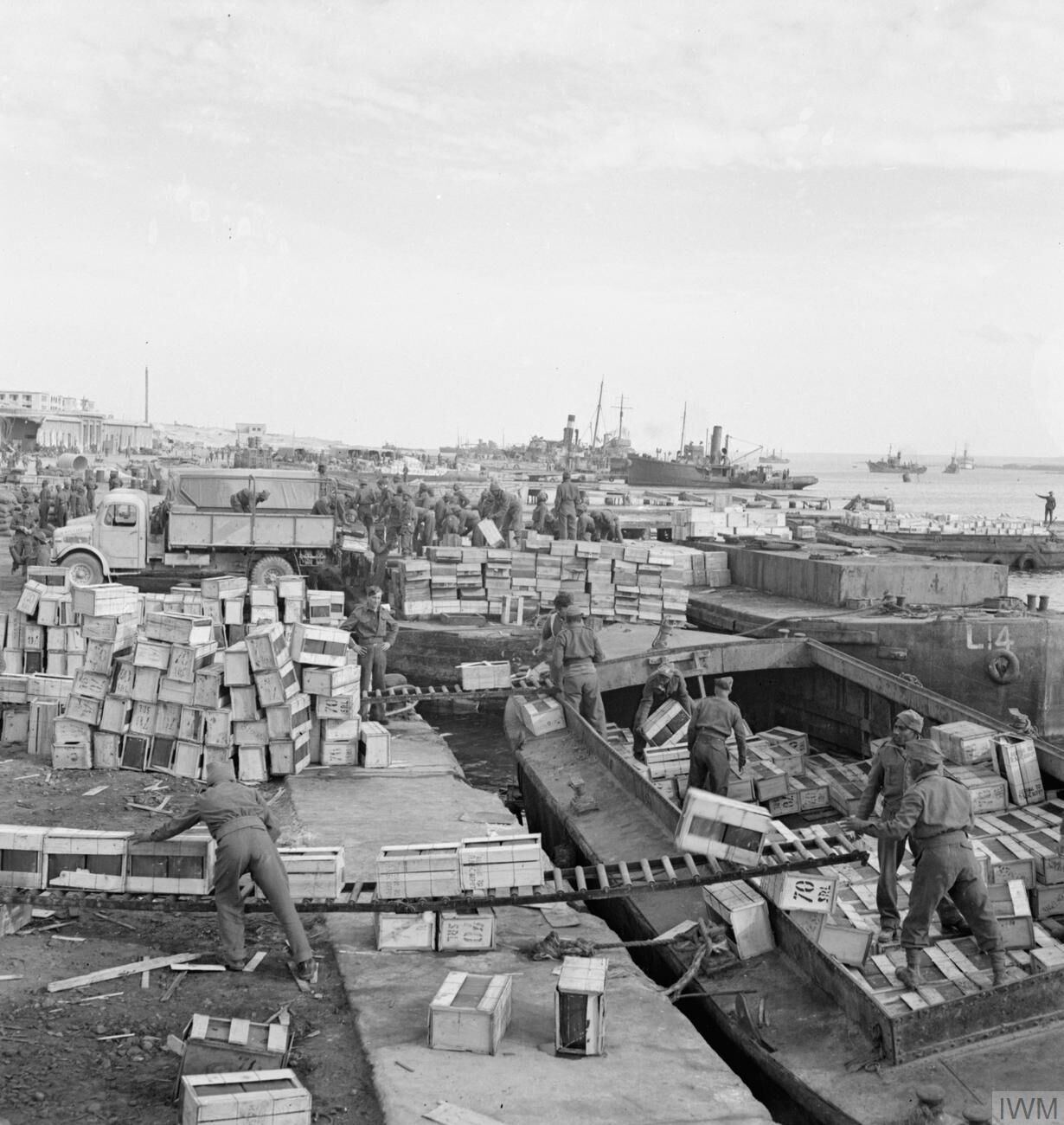
Stores being unloaded in Tobruk harbour in the spring of 1942, for Operation Acrobat, that was forestalled by the Axis attack.

Supplied with more modern tanks, the second Axis offensive saw the reoccupation of western Cyrenaica but the Axis ran out of supplies to the west of Gazala. A lull followed as both sides prepared for a new offensive. The British built up the Gazala Line, fortified positions known as "boxes", defended by extensive minefields. The Axis forces forestalled the British with Unternehmen Venezia (known to the British as the Battle of Gazala), which began on 26 May 1942. Poorly armed and armoured British tanks and inferior co-ordination allowed Rommel to defeat the Eighth Army tanks piecemeal and by 13 June the British had begun to retreat eastwards from Gazala, leaving Tobruk vulnerable to attack.

=== Axis plans ===
On 1 May 1942, a meeting of Axis leaders was held at the Berghof in Berchtesgaden, with Adolf Hitler and Albert Kesselring, the Wehrmacht Oberbefehlshaber Süd (Commander-in-Chief South), Benito Mussolini and Ugo Cavallero, the Chief of the Defence Staff, for Italy. It was decided that Rommel should start Unternehmen Venezia (Operation Venice), an offensive at the end of May, to capture Tobruk. If successful, Rommel was to go no further east than the Egyptian border and take up defensive positions while an invasion of Malta (Operation Herkules) was undertaken in mid-July. The capture of Malta would secure the Axis supply lines to North Africa before Rommel invaded Egypt, with the Suez Canal as the final objective. Axis planning had been given considerable assistance after the Italian Servizio Informazioni Militare (Military Information Service) had broken the Black Code used by Colonel Bonner Fellers, the US military attaché in Cairo, to send detailed and often critical reports to Washington of the British war effort in the Middle East.

=== British plans ===
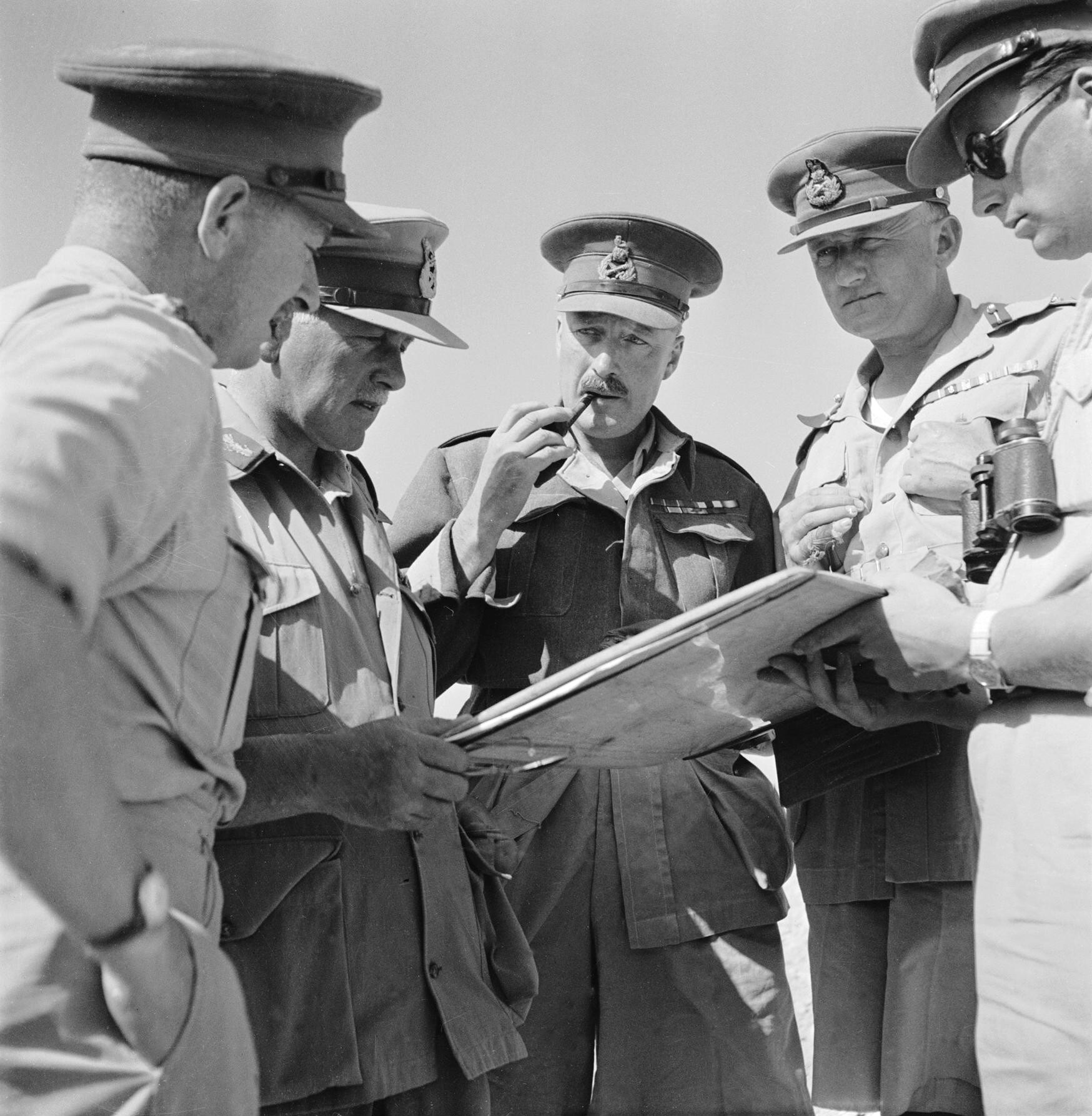
Lieutenant-General Ritchie, Commander-in-Chief Eighth Army, with his corps commanders, generals Willoughby Norrie and William Gott 31 May 1942.

In a meeting held in Cairo on 4 February 1942, the service commanders-in-chief of Middle East Command considered what their course of action should be in the event of a further successful Axis offensive, the front line at that time being only 30 mi (48 km) west of Tobruk. The commanders knew how valuable the port would be to Axis forces but decided against defending it. General Sir Claude Auchinleck was reluctant to have a valuable division tied down as a garrison, especially as reinforcements might be urgently needed for Persia and Iraq; Admiral Sir Andrew Cunningham could not risk the shipping losses incurred supplying the garrison during the first siege.

Air Marshal Sir Peter Drummond (deputy to Air Chief Marshal Sir Arthur Tedder), contended that it might prove impossible to provide fighter cover for the port. Auchinleck drafted orders for Lieutenant-General Neil Ritchie, the commander of the Eighth Army, that he was to make every effort to prevent Tobruk from being taken but he was not to allow his forces to be surrounded there. If the fall of Tobruk was imminent, "the place should be evacuated and the maximum amount of destruction carried out in it", while a firm defence line should be established further east on the Egyptian border. This withdrawal arrangement was formalised as Operation Freeborn.

By 14 June, Operation Venice had forced Ritchie to implement Operation Freeborn, the withdrawal of the 50th (Northumbrian) Infantry Division and the 1st South African Infantry Division from the Gazala line, eastwards through Tobruk and on towards the Egyptian border. On the previous day, Auchinleck had confirmed to Ritchie that, if all else failed, the frontier should be "a rallying point". Auchinleck began to reassess the Tobruk position; neither he nor Ritchie wanted to lose the considerable stocks of fuel, munitions and other stores which had been built up at the port for Operation Acrobat. On the morning of 14 June, he had received a message from Winston Churchill that "retreat would be fatal"; despite the misgivings of his senior commanders, Churchill had apparently told Roosevelt that he would hold Tobruk.

Auchinleck signalled to Ritchie that he was to hold a line from Acroma (west of Tobruk) extending south-east to El Adem, which would screen Tobruk. Ritchie did not receive the order until two hours before his carefully organised night withdrawal was due to start; too late to alter the manoeuvre. The 50th (Northumbrian) and 1st South African divisions were saved from encirclement but were withdrawn beyond the line which Auchinleck intended them to hold. Ritchie informed Auchinleck that he would attempt to hold the Acroma–El Adem line with troops from XXX Corps but warned that if this failed, Tobruk might either become "temporarily isolated" or be evacuated and asked which option was to be taken. Auchinleck replied that "On no account will any part of the Eighth Army be allowed to be surrounded in Tobruk and invested there", which Ritchie interpreted as meaning that he should evacuate Tobruk if there were an Axis breakthrough. On the morning of 15 June, the situation was confused further by a message from Churchill which included the phrase "Presume there is no question in any case of giving up Tobruk?" Auchinleck replied to Churchill that Ritchie had sufficient troops to hold Tobruk. Auchinleck then signalled to Ritchie that although Tobruk was "not to be invested", it could be "isolated for short periods" and that he should organise a garrison accordingly. It was clear to Ritchie that the collapse of the Acroma–El Adem line was imminent.

=== Tobruk isolated ===
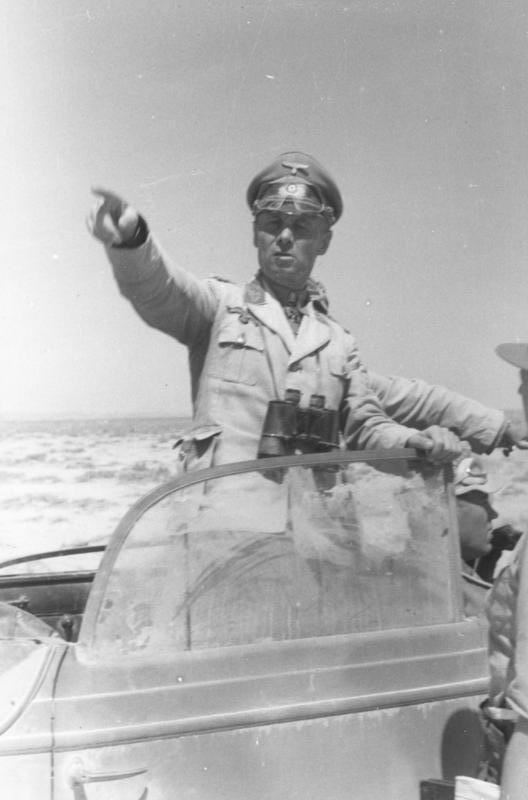
General Erwin Rommel, directing operations to the west of Tobruk, 16 June 1942

The area around El Adem was held by 29th Indian Infantry Brigade (Brigadier Denys Reid). On 15 June, the 90th Light Division attacked El Adem three times by but was repulsed by the defenders. Simultaneously, an attack by the 21st Panzer Division on Point B 650, about 5.0 mi (8 km) north of El Adem was defeated by the Indians and the 7th Motor Brigade; a second attack succeeded later that evening. The attacks on El Adem were stopped after further reverses but the threat of being surrounded caused its evacuation on the night of 16/17 June. This left RAF Gambut on the coast vulnerable, causing the Desert Air Force (DAF) to withdraw eastwards, severely limiting air support. The last outpost of the defensive line was Belhamed, a hill adjacent to Sidi Rezegh, which was held by the 20th Indian Infantry Brigade, a new formation.

On 17 June, the 4th Armoured Brigade was ordered to attack, hoping to take the flank of the German armour, now supplemented by 15th Panzer Division, as it moved northwards towards the coast. The brigade had been hurriedly reformed after the Gazala battles and had about ninety tanks in composite units but lacked much of its artillery, which had been detached to form harassing columns. After an engagement lasting most of the afternoon, the British brigade withdrew to refit and then towards Egypt, having lost 32 tanks. The 20th Indian Brigade was ordered to withdraw during that night but were caught as the German armour reached the coast at Gambut and two of its battalions were captured. Also captured was the abandoned RAF base with 15 aircraft and considerable fuel supplies; to the west, a vast Allied stores dump with thousands of lorries was taken. The next morning, 18 June, Rommel was able to report to Berlin that Tobruk had been surrounded and was under siege.

== Opposing forces ==
=== Tobruk garrison ===
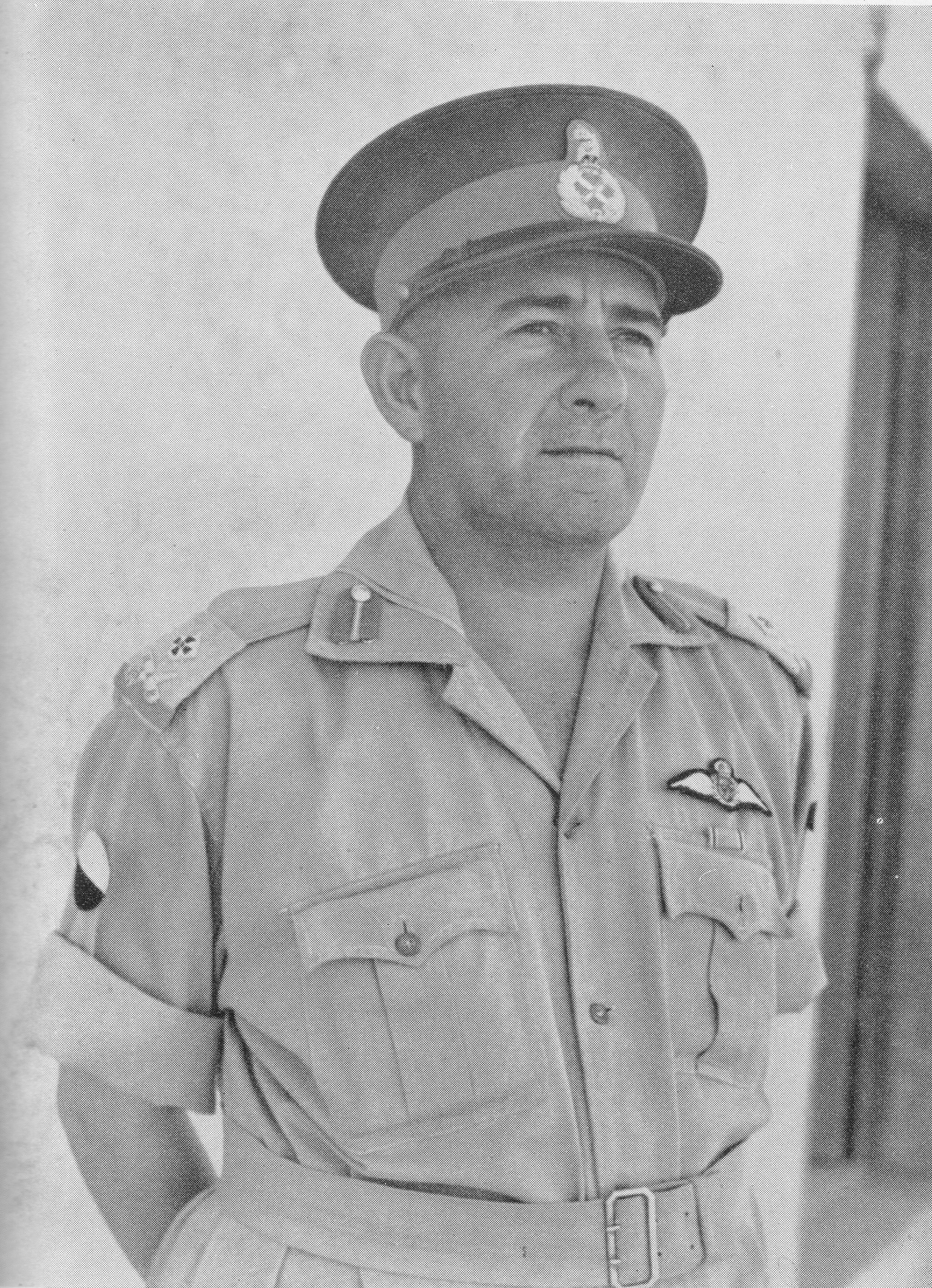
Major General Hendrik Klopper, commander of the 2nd South African Infantry Division and the Tobruk garrison.

The Tobruk garrison was numerically large at about 33,000 men but this number included around 8,000 support troops and around 2,000 non-combatant labourers. A third of the garrison comprised the 2nd South African Infantry Division (Major General Hendrik Klopper, who was put in charge of the defence of Tobruk on 15 June). The division was a brigade short, consisting of the 4th South African Infantry Brigade and 6th South African Infantry Brigade and attached units. The 2nd South African Division was not a veteran formation but it had captured Bardia and Sollum during Operation Crusader in January and had been based in Tobruk since the end of March. Klopper had been a staff officer of the division and had taken over from Major-General I. P. de Villiers on 14 May.

The British 32nd Army Tank Brigade (Brigadier Arthur Willison) had three squadrons of the 4th Royal Tank Regiment (4th RTR) with 35 operational Valentine tanks, two squadrons of the 7th RTR with parts of the 8th RTR and 42nd RTR, with 26 serviceable Valentines and Matildas. The 201st Guards Motor Brigade had the 3rd Coldstream Guards, up to establishment and with ten 6-pounder anti-tank guns, the 1st Battalion, Sherwood Foresters, nearly at full strength with four 6-pounders and 500 men of the 1st Battalion, Worcestershire Regiment, which had been mauled at Point 187 on 14 June. The 11th Indian Infantry Brigade had the experienced 2nd Battalion, Queen's Own Cameron Highlanders, 2/5th Mahratta Light Infantry with many young replacements and the inexperienced 2/7th Gurkha Rifles, an understrength anti-tank company and Beergroup (Lieutenant-Colonel John de Beer), a composite infantry battalion from the 1st South African Division.

The garrison included the field artillery of the 2nd and 3rd South African Field Regiments and the 25th Field Regiment RA, the 67th and 68th Medium Regiments RA, each with eight 4.5-inch guns and eight 155 mm M1918 howitzers. The 6th South African Anti-Tank Battery and A Battery, 95th Anti-Tank Regiment RA were both understrength with fifteen new 6-pounder anti-tank guns, 32 of the older and less effective 2-pounders and eight Bofors 37 mm anti-tank guns. There were eighteen 3.7-inch heavy anti-aircraft guns of the 4th Anti-Aircraft Brigade RA (eighteen had been withdrawn to the frontier on 16 June) and the light guns of the 2nd South African Light Anti-Aircraft Regiment. Many non-essential troops had been evacuated, there remained a number of administrative units of the HQ 88th Sub-Area ( Brigadier Leslie Thompson) including ten transport companies and a Naval Establishment (Captain P. N. Walter RN). The fighter aircraft of 40 Squadron (SAAF) had been withdrawn from the airfield within the perimeter but a Air Support Tentacle remained. The squadrons of the Desert Air Force had moved back to airfields at Sidi Barrani, which put Tobruk beyond the range of their fighters except for the Curtiss Kittyhawks of 250 Squadron RAF, which had drop tanks.

The South African brigades held the west and south-west sectors of the perimeter, where most of the fighting in the first siege had taken place. The Indian brigade was deployed to the east and south of the perimeter. The perimeter was 35 mi (56 km) long and the coast added another 20 mi (32 km). On average, each anti-tank gun would have had to defend a frontage of 750 yd (690 m) if they had been spread evenly around the perimeter. Owing to the decision not to stand another siege, little work had been done to maintain the Tobruk fortifications. In many places, the trenches and the anti-tank ditch had collapsed or filled with drifting sand and part of the ditch had been filled in to allow the British armour to cross during the December 1941 break-out. Large quantities of barbed wire and land mines had been removed to bolster the Gazala defences, while some of the old Italian mines which remained were found to be defective. Some work had been done by South African engineers to remedy the situation but there is conflicting evidence as to the condition of the defences at the start of the siege.

Klopper was put in charge of the Tobruk garrison on 15 June, five days before the Axis attack. On 16 June, Lieutenant-General William Gott, the commander of XIII Corps, whose headquarters were still in Tobruk, suggested that he should take command but was overruled by Ritchie and he left Tobruk, leaving three of his staff officers to assist Klopper. Gott ordered Klopper to prepare three plans – for co-operating with the Allied forces outside Tobruk, for re-establishing a presence at Belhamed and for the evacuation of the garrison eastwards. This placed a considerable extra burden on Klopper and his staff who were already very busy.

=== Panzerarmee Afrika/Armata Corazzata Africa ===
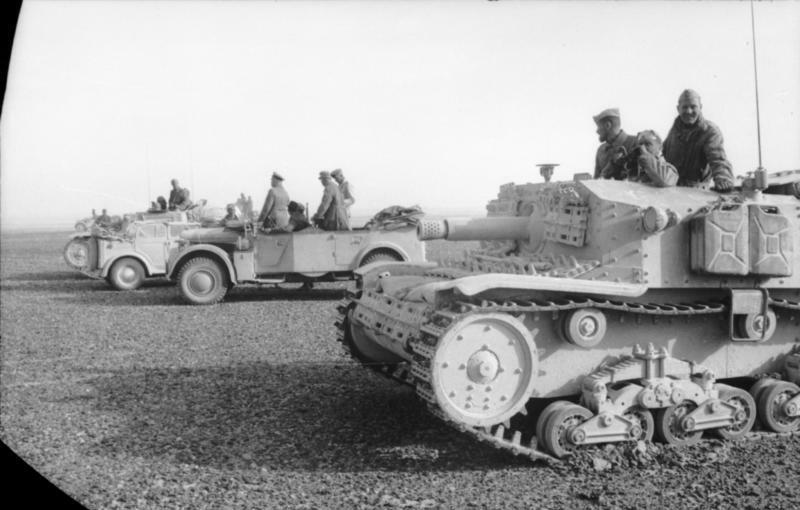
Rommel with Italian Semovente da 75/18 self-propelled guns

A plan for the rapid capture of Tobruk had been agreed between Kesselring and Cavallero on 10 June, consisting of an attack in stages from the south and west. Rommel ignored them and used his plan of October 1941, attacking from the south-east, where the ground was flatter than the gullied terrain in the south-west. He began to deploy his forces to their jumping-off positions on 18 June.

On the western end of the line was the Italian XXI Corps comprising the 7th Bersaglieri Regiment, the 60th Infantry Division "Sabratha" and the 102nd Motorised Division "Trento", southwards from the coast. At the south-west corner of the perimeter was the German 15th Rifle Brigade. To the south was the Italian X Corps with the 27th Infantry Division "Brescia" forward and the 17th Infantry Division "Pavia" in reserve. In the south-eastern corner were the German 90th Light Division and the Axis artillery. On the eastern boundary was the Italian XX Motorised Corps with the 101st Motorised Division "Trieste" forward; the 132nd Armoured Division "Ariete" was in the south-west at Bir er Reghem and the newly arrived 133rd Armoured Division "Littorio" was moving in behind it. The 15th Panzer Division and 21st Panzer Division were in the east, on either side of the village of Kambut.

Kesselring had warned that, because all Axis aircraft had to be withdrawn by the end of June, for the invasion of Malta, an early result was vital. About 150 bombers of various types were available, mostly German, including 40 to 50 fighter-bombers and 21 Junkers Ju 87 (Stuka) dive-bombers. About 50 German and 100 Italian fighters were also within range. The recent capture of airfields close to the Tobruk perimeter allowed for rapid refuelling and rearming.

== Battle ==
=== 18–19 June ===
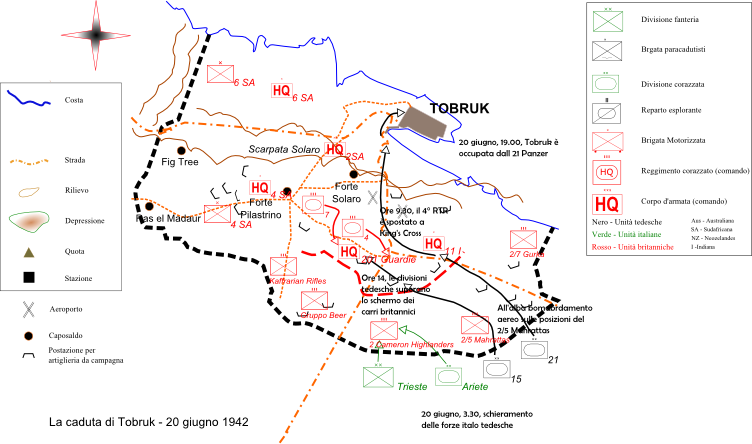
The Axis attack on Tobruk on 20 June 1942

Wishing to exploit the disorganisation of the Eighth Army, Rommel issued his orders for the assault on 18 June and reconnaissance of deployment areas commenced early the next day. Starting in the afternoon of 19 June and through that night, the Afrika Korps armoured formations changed places with 90th Light Division, so that they were facing the south-eastern corner of the perimeter, occupied by the inexperienced 2nd Battalion, 5th Mahratta Light Infantry. The 15th Panzer Division was on the left of the attack and 21st Panzer on the right, with a motorised infantry group (detached from the 90th Light Division and commanded by Generalleutnant Erwin Menny) in the centre. XX Corps was to attack further to the left, followed by X Corps, which was to occupy and hold the perimeter defences. In the west, XXI Corps was to make a feint attack to pin down the South African brigades, while in the east, the 90th Light Division was to prevent relief attempts on Tobruk by the Eighth Army. When the Axis artillery arrived at their positions near El Adem, they found Axis ammunition, which had been abandoned in November and had never been cleared away.

=== 20 June ===
==== Morning ====
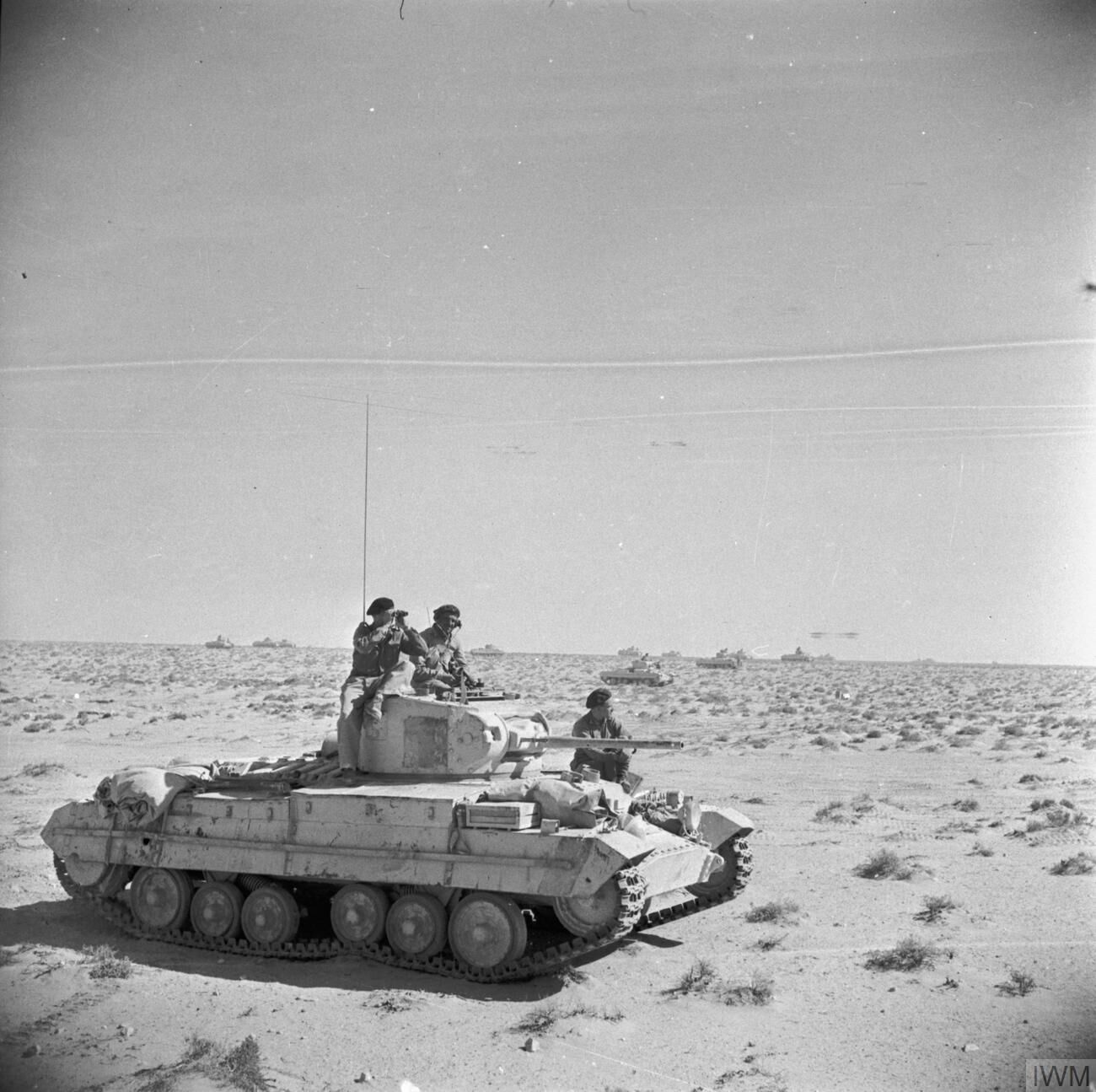
British Valentine tanks similar to those of the 32nd Army Tank Brigade, 18 June 1942

The assault opened at 5:20 a.m. on 20 June with an intense air bombardment on the south-eastern perimeter. The Luftwaffe flew 588 sorties, the highest sortie rate achieved in the Mediterranean theatre, while the Regia Aeronautica flew 177. The total weight of bombs dropped was more than 365 t (359 long tons). Gruppe Menny began its attack at 7:00 a.m., which coincided with the opening of the artillery barrage, which had been delayed by late arrivals at their positions; a breach in the line between two strong points had been made at 7:45 a.m. The German 900th Engineer Battalion was able to make crossings over the anti-tank ditch, using prefabricated bridging equipment; the first German tanks were across the ditch by 8:30 a.m. By then, several strong points had been taken by the infantry, creating a bridgehead 2 km (1.2 mi) wide. The Mahrattas committed their reserves in an abortive counter-attack and although they had been given to understand that a tank battalion would be coming to their assistance, this never materialised. The Ariete Division, the spearhead of XX Corps, had failed to penetrate the line held by 2nd Battalion, Cameron Highlanders and were redirected into the breach made by the Afrika Korps and then sent westwards towards Fort Pilastrino.

After initially thinking that the attack in the south-east was a feint, Klopper's headquarters gave orders for a counter-attack by the 32nd Army Tank Brigade, supported by whatever elements of the Guards and Indian brigades they required. The orders were misunderstood at the tank brigade headquarters and they ordered only the 4th RTR to attack. The assistance of a battlegroup from the 3rd Battalion, Coldstream Guards was declined through lack of orders. The counter-attack might have succeeded if it had been made with greater force, while the Axis armour was still making its way across the anti-tank ditch. By the time it had begun, the Afrika Korps had been moving into the perimeter for an hour and a half and the Ariete armoured division was established on their left. The 8th Bersaglieri Regiment entered the perimeter and captured several redoubts. The 7th RTR moved up in support on their initiative but half were diverted to assist the Camerons. The Afrika Korps defeated the British armour in detail, aided by constant attack from the air. The only British air raid that morning was called for the forward air control "tentacle" to bomb Axis vehicles moving through the south-east breach and was carried out by nine Douglas Bostons escorted by long-range Kittyhawk fighters.

==== Noon, 20 June ====
By noon, Rommel had 113 tanks inside the Tobruk perimeter. By 1:30 p.m., the Afrika Korps had reached their objective, the Kings Cross road junction on the crest of the Pilastrino Ridge and overlooked the town of Tobruk, about 9 km (6 mi) to the north. The 21st Panzer headed for the town, scattering the remaining tanks of the 7th RTR. The last obstacle for the panzers was a motley of artillery units which made a determined defence, including the use of several 3.7-inch anti-aircraft guns against the German tanks; Rommel later praised their "extraordinary tenacity". Later in the afternoon, Klopper's headquarters was bombarded. At 4:00 p.m., German tanks were seen to the east and Klopper thought that his headquarters, to the south-west of the town, was in danger of being overrun. He ordered a hurried evacuation, in which much of the communication equipment was destroyed. The German tanks moved off in a different direction but without communications equipment, Klopper moved to the headquarters of 6th South African Brigade in the north-west of the fortress at 6:30 p.m.

==== Evening, 20 June ====
The leading German units had not reached the outskirts of the port until 6:00 p.m. British engineers and supply troops began to destroy the immense quantities of fuel, water, ammunition and stores in the town along with the port facilities. The 15th Panzer Division had begun to advance westwards along the Pilastrino Ridge, where elements of the 201st Guards Brigade had taken up exposed positions at short notice. When their brigade headquarters was overrun at about 6:45 p.m., most of the units either stopped fighting or withdrew to Fort Pilastrano at the western end of the ridge. The 15th Panzer ended their advance since they were under orders to cover the approach of 21st Panzer to the town, which was reported to have been taken at 7:00 p.m. The final evacuation of small naval vessels had been carried out under fire; fifteen craft escaped but twenty-five, including a minesweeper, were sunk in the harbour or lost to air attacks on the passage to Alexandria.

At last light, the Axis units halted for the night. The remnants of the British and Indian units in the eastern sector of the fortress prepared themselves for all-round defence; the South African brigades had not been engaged except for some diversionary activity. From Klopper's new headquarters came a signal that all units should prepare to break out at 10:00 p.m. and a message was sent to the Eighth Army HQ, "Am holding out but I do not know for how long". The Eighth Army staff suggested that the break-out should be on the following night (21/22 June) and that it was essential that all the fuel be destroyed. Although Ritchie had ordered the 7th Armoured Division to move north towards Sidi Rezegh, to the south-east of the Tobruk perimeter, there is no evidence that they advanced very far or threatened the Axis cordon. Discussions between Klopper, his brigadiers and staff officers followed. The chances of a break-out were impeded by the fact that the 2nd South African Division was not a motorised formation and many of the vehicles that they did possess were in the town and had been captured. The option to stand and fight in the western sector was considered but the main ammunition dumps had also been captured. At 2:00 a.m. on 21 June, Klopper signalled to the Eighth Army HQ that he would attempt a break-out that evening. In the meantime, the garrison would "fight to the last man and the last round".

=== 21 June ===
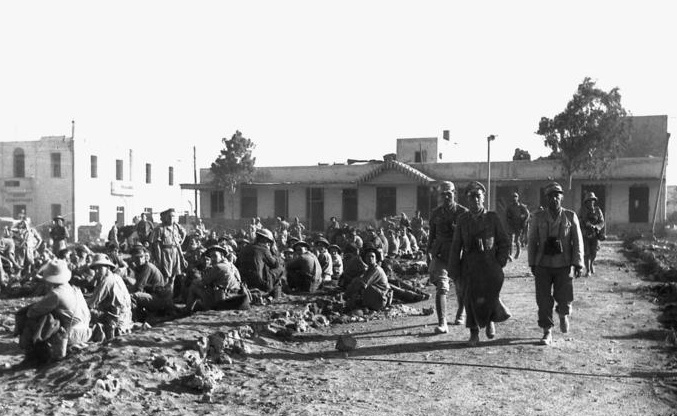
Rommel and Fritz Bayerlein, with prisoners of war, probably South African, in Tobruk

As dawn approached Klopper changed his mind and concluded that any value to be gained from continuing the fight would not be worth the cost in additional casualties. In an exchange of signals at 6:00 a.m. Ritchie sent, "I cannot tell tactical situation and therefore leave you to act on your own judgement regarding capitulation". Shortly after this, German officers were invited to Klopper's headquarters to finalise the details. Orders to surrender were sent out and received with astonishment by those units who had scarcely been engaged. Some units did not receive the order; the 2nd Battalion, 7th Gurkha Rifles, on the eastern perimeter, fought on until that evening, while the Cameron Highlanders continued fighting until the morning of 22 June. Captain Sainthill of the Coldstream Guards and 199 of his officers and men were able to break out of the south-west perimeter in their battalion transport and rejoin the Eighth Army. A small group of 188 South Africans, largely of the Kaffrarian Rifles, escaped eastwards along the coast and reached El Alamein 38 days later and the 9th Bersaglieri Regiment later entered the perimeter and captured the remaining redoubts. Rommel entered the town at 5:00 a.m. and established his headquarters at the Hotel Tobruk. A meeting was arranged with Klopper, who surrendered to Rommel on the Via Balbia about 6 km (4 mi) west of Tobruk at 9:40 a.m. on 21 June.

== Aftermath ==
=== Analysis ===
In 1942, a Court of Inquiry was held in absentia, which found Klopper to be largely blameless for the surrender. The verdict was kept secret, which did little to enhance his or his troops' reputation. After the war, Winston Churchill wrote that the blame belonged to the British High Command, not to Klopper or his troops. He accepted that the facts were obscured at the time as the Tobruk leadership were all prisoners of war but that the truth had since emerged. The British official historian, Ian Playfair, wrote in 1960 that "the reasons for the disaster are plain enough". It was commonly accepted that there was no intention of standing another siege of Tobruk and that the port was not prepared for one. Neither Auchinleck nor Ritchie appreciated the extent of the defeat which the Eighth Army had suffered at Gazala or that the Eighth Army was no longer able simultaneously to continue to fight in the Tobruk area, defend the frontier and prepare a counter-attack. Klopper and his staff did not have the experience to make best use of their resources under such difficult circumstances. Rommel had overwhelming air support at Tobruk, because almost all of the Allied fighter aircraft had been withdrawn and were out of range; Luftwaffe bombing played an important role in breaching the defences.

==== Repercussions ====
On 21 June, the prime minister, Winston Churchill and the Chief of the Imperial General Staff, Alan Brooke, were attending the Second Washington Conference discussing grand strategy with the US President, Franklin D. Roosevelt and the US Army Chief of Staff, George C. Marshall. An American aide arrived with the news of the Tobruk surrender, which he gave to the President who passed it to Churchill. Churchill's military aide Hastings Ismay contacted London and confirmed the news. The conference also received a telegram from British Minister-Resident in the Middle East Richard Casey warning that the defeat opened the possibility of an Axis invasion of Egypt. Churchill recalled in his memoirs,

I did not attempt to hide from the President the shock I had received. It was a bitter moment. Defeat is one thing; disgrace is another. Nothing could exceed the sympathy and chivalry of my two friends. There were no reproaches; not an unkind word was spoken. "What can we do to help?" said Roosevelt. I replied at once, "Give us as many Sherman tanks as you can spare and ship them to the Middle East as quickly as possible".

— The Second World War: The Hinge of Fate (1950)

Roosevelt asked General Marshall to see what could be done. Marshall ordered the 2nd Armored Division, which was training with its new M4 Sherman tanks, to prepare to move to Egypt. When it became apparent that this new formation could not be made operational until the autumn, Marshall decided instead to send three hundred of their Shermans, a hundred M7 Priest (105 mm self-propelled guns) spare parts and one hundred and fifty instructors, in a fast convoy beginning on 1 July.

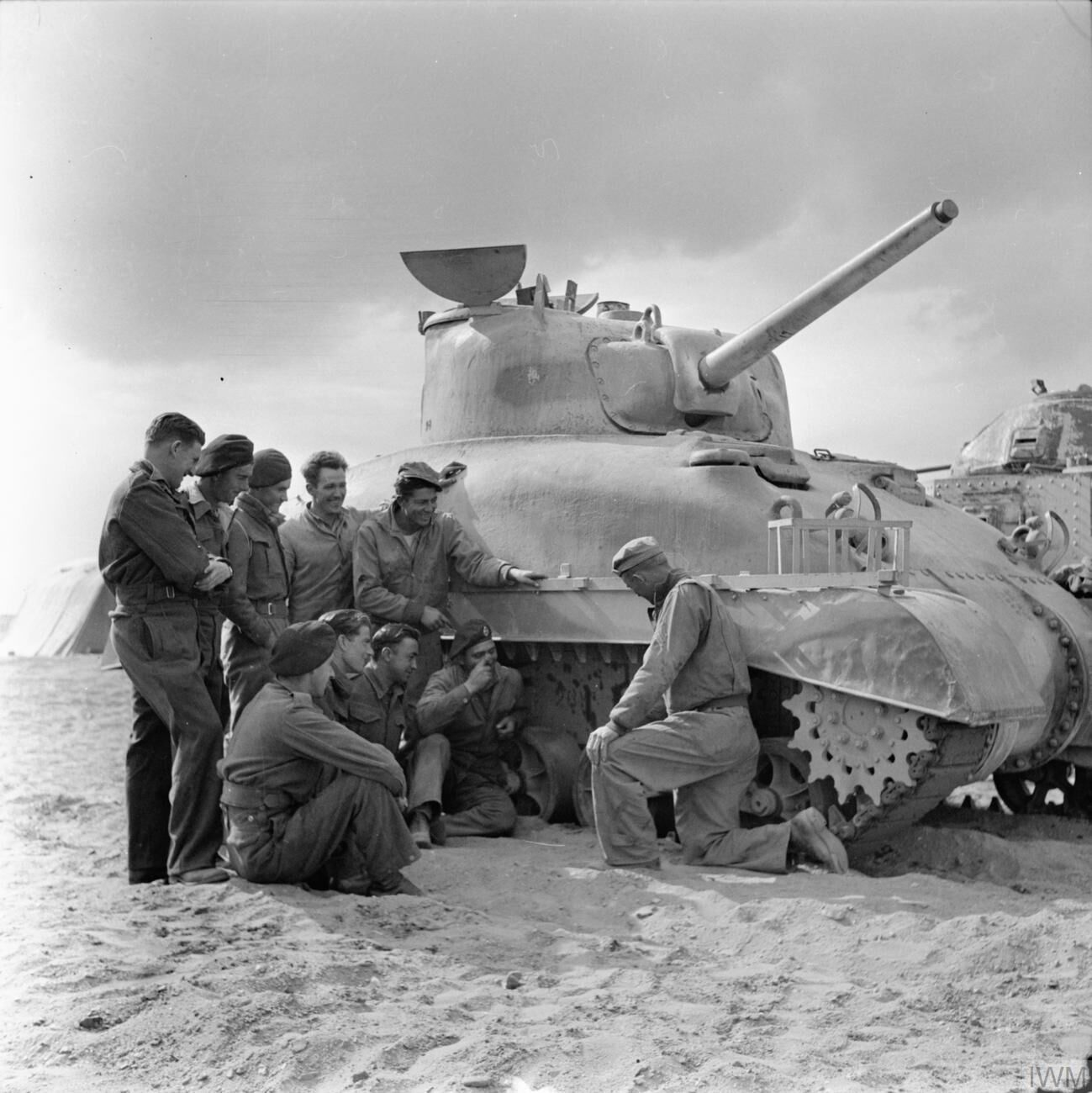
British, South African and New Zealand tank crews receive instruction on the M4 Sherman tank from an American instructor at a training camp near Cairo, in February 1943.

Brooke later wrote,

I always feel that the Tobruk episode in the President's study did a great deal towards laying the foundations of friendship and understanding built up during the war between the President and Marshall on the one hand and Churchill and myself on the other.

— War Diaries 1939–1945 (1957, 1959, 2001)

On 25 June the Maldon by-election was won by Tom Driberg, a left-wing journalist, standing as an independent, who gained sixty per cent of the vote, defeating the Conservative Party candidate. Churchill and others attributed the defeat to the loss of Tobruk four days before; Driberg denied this was a major factor, suggesting instead that it was part of a wider swing to the left and away from the established political parties. In parliament, there was a growing feeling that Churchill was responsible for the muddle and lack of direction in the management of the war, despite his popularity with the public. The Labour Party MP Aneurin Bevan tried to force a parliamentary enquiry into Churchill's role in the defeats at Gazala and Tobruk but was prevented by Clement Attlee, the Labour Deputy Prime Minister. When a right-wing Conservative, Sir John Wardlaw-Milne, tabled a motion of no-confidence in the coalition government, there was speculation that it might go the way of the Norway Debate, which had led to the resignation of the previous prime minister, Neville Chamberlain, in May 1940. The debate opened on 1 July and on the following day Bevan attacked Churchill by saying that he "fights debates like a war and war like a debate". Churchill replied with (according to Anthony Eden) "one of his most effective speeches" and the government won by 425 votes to 25.

=== Casualties ===
| Nationality | POW |
|---|---|
| British | 19,000 |
| South African | 10,720 |
| Indian | 2,500 |
| Total | 32,200 |

It was the second-largest capitulation by the British Army in the war (behind the fall of Singapore) and the biggest defeat in the history of the Union Defence Force. German propaganda initially reported that the Wehrmacht had captured 25,000 Allied prisoners of war, which turned out to be an underestimate as the true total was 32,200. The Germans left the task of housing the prisoners to the Italians, who lacked the infrastructure to treat the prisoners in accordance with the Geneva Convention. The prisoners were crammed into open pens to await deportation and were left seriously short of food and water. Conditions improved after the prisoners had been transported in cargo ships to Italy. Many of them, especially South Africans, were subject to recriminations from other prisoners, who felt that Tobruk had surrendered too easily.

At the Italian armistice in September 1943, many prisoners escaped, including Klopper, who was rescued by Popski's Private Army (Major Vladimir Peniakoff) which was operating nearby. The number of Eighth Army prisoners taken in the battle is not certain, because the Eighth Army records were lost. Axis casualties are not known either but German casualties for the fighting since 26 May (including Gazala) was reported as 3,360 of whom 300 were officers; German losses for 20 to 22 June would have been considerably less than that. An estimate of British casualties was published in the British official history, the History of the Second World War and The Mediterranean and Middle East: British Fortunes Reach Their Lowest Ebb and is shown in the table above.

==== Axis ====
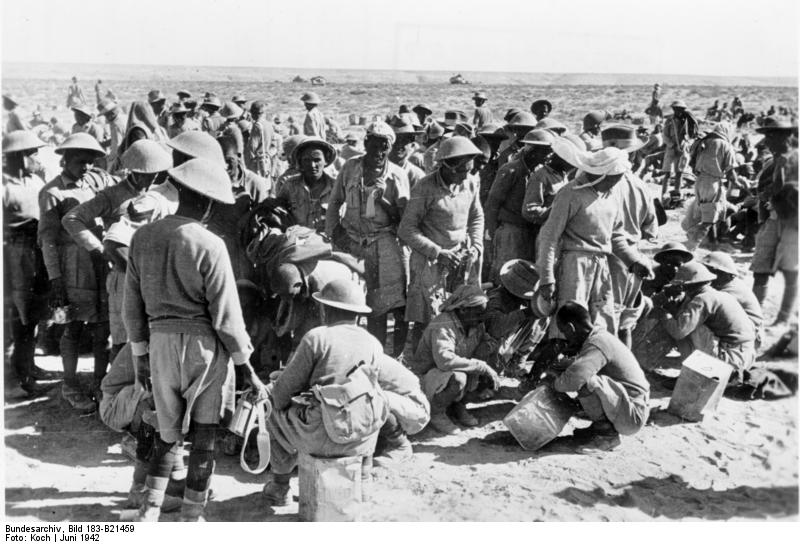
Indian Army prisoners of war captured at Tobruk await deportation on 1 July 1942

The Nazi hierarchy shared Churchill's view of the symbolic importance of Tobruk and Joseph Goebbels, the Reich Minister of Propaganda, made much of its capture. On 22 June, Hitler promoted Rommel to Generalfeldmarschall, making him the youngest field marshal in the German Army, much to the annoyance of senior Italian officers. Although Rommel undoubtedly considered it a great honour, he later confided to his wife that he would rather have been given another division. Mussolini was also jubilant and is said to have ordered that a suitable white horse be found for his triumphal entry into Cairo.

Despite the demolitions at Tobruk, the Axis captured about 1,400 t (1,400 long tons) of fuel and a further 20 t (20 long tons) at Belhamed. Amongst the 2,000 vehicles captured were 30 serviceable tanks. It has been estimated that Rommel was using some 6,000 captured British lorries by the end of the month. Also taken in Tobruk were 7,000 t (6,900 long tons) of water and three million rations of food [5,000 t (4,900 long tons)]. Because of the tenuous Axis supply line, the troops had been living on very short rations and the British supplies were enthusiastically received, especially chocolate, canned milk and vegetables; stores of shirts and socks were enthusiastically looted. The equally deprived Italian troops tended to be excluded from the plundering.

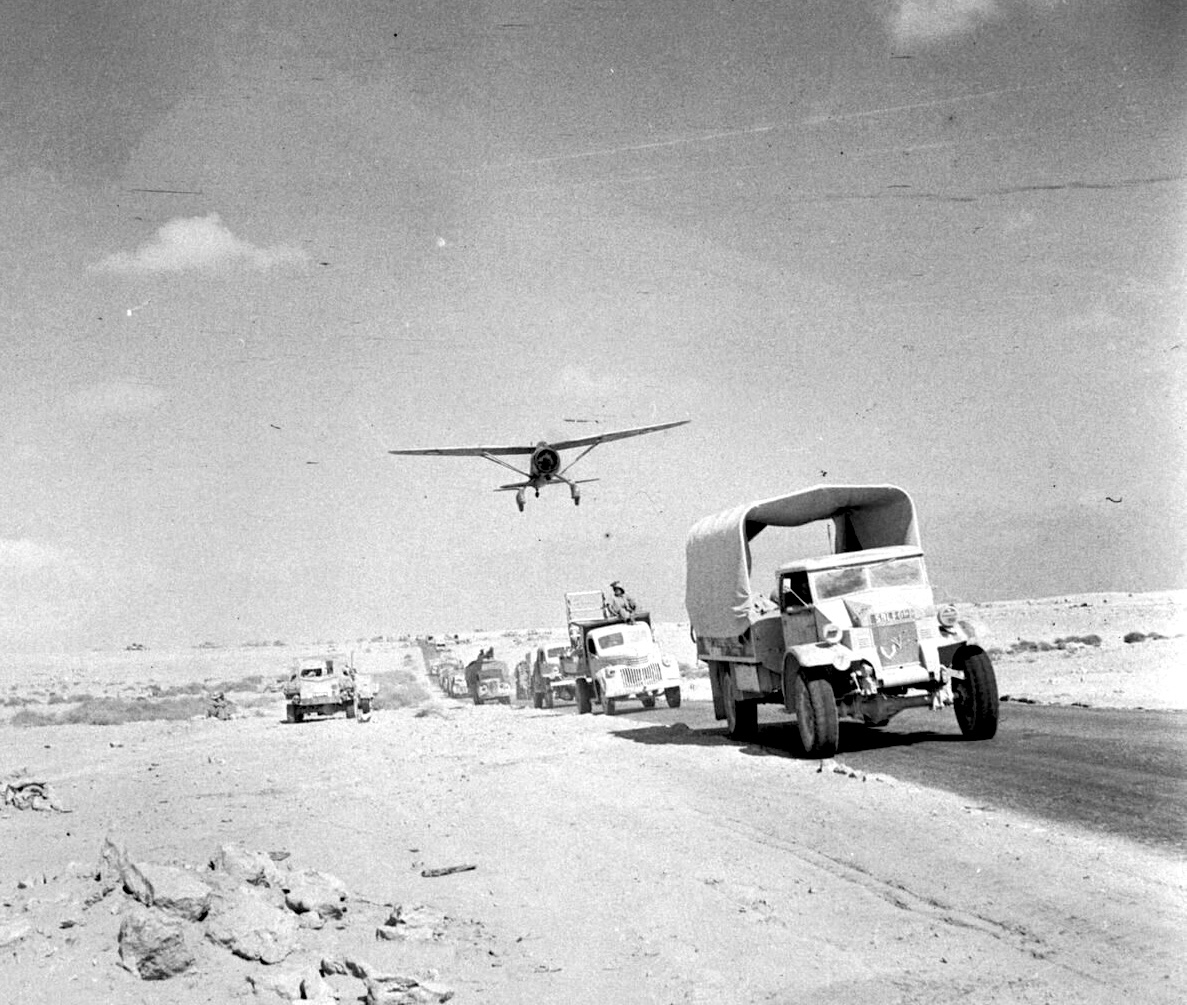
An RAF Westland Lysander flies over a convoy of British lorries during the retreat into Egypt, 26 June 1942.

In the afternoon of 21 June, the day of the surrender, Kesselring visited Rommel's headquarters and reminded him of the agreement that the invasion of Malta would follow the capture of Tobruk and that his aircraft were already returning to Italy. The next day, a senior Italian staff officer arrived with orders from General Bastico to halt. Rommel, now a field marshal, was able to decline this "advice". He had the latest pessimistic report from the US military attaché Bonner Fellers in Cairo to Washington on the British dispositions, which concluded with the phrase; "If Rommel intends to take the Delta, now is the time"; the supplies captured at Tobruk made that possible.

=== Axis invasion of Egypt ===
On 22 June, Rommel by-passed the chain of command by writing directly to Mussolini via the German attaché in Rome, Enno von Rintelen, requesting that the offensive be allowed to continue and that the Malta invasion be postponed to preserve his air support. Mussolini forwarded the letter to Hitler, who had been harbouring doubts about the Malta operation. Hitler replied the next day with an effusive letter which agreed with Rommel's suggestion and urged Mussolini not to let the opportunity slip away, stating that "the goddess of success passes generals only once". The British retreat soon became a rout. Ritchie decided not to regroup at the Egyptian border as planned but further east at the fortified port and army base at Mersa Matruh.

Auchinleck sacked Ritchie on 25 June, taking charge of the Eighth Army and began a further withdrawal to a better defensive position at El Alamein. On the next day, Rommel arrived at Matruh and broke through in the centre. The Battle of Mersa Matruh was another fiasco for the Eighth Army, who suffered 8,000 casualties and lost a lot of equipment and supplies but the bulk of the Eighth Army was able to break out and fall back to El Alamein. Rommel hoped that a swift central attack on the new British positions might succeed in the same way as at Mersa Matruh but he was moving further away from his air support and supply bases. The Axis came correspondingly within the range of the DAF and their advance was eventually halted at the First Battle of El Alamein in July. El Alamein was to be the furthest advance eastwards of the Panzer Army Africa.

=== Operation Agreement ===
The deadlock following El Alamein prompted a plan to attack the coastal flank of the Axis forces. Operation Agreement was a raid on Tobruk by the Special Air Service attacking from the desert, while a large amphibious force was landed by naval vessels. The raid on 13/14 September 1942 was a disaster; a cruiser and a destroyer were sunk and there were some 800 Allied fatalities, without any of the objectives being achieved. Following the Second Battle of El Alamein in late October 1942, the Panzer Army Africa withdrew towards El Agheila, allowing the 7th Armoured Division to enter Tobruk unopposed on 13 November. Tobruk was the first big port west of Alexandria to be recaptured; some jetties were found to be intact and an Allied convoy arrived on 19 November. Despite a fire on a merchant ship, a daily average of 880 long tons (890 t) of supplies were landed there in support of the Allied offensive.

== See also ==
- List of British military equipment of World War II
- List of German military equipment of World War II
- List of Italian military equipment in World War II

== Sources ==
=== Books ===
- Barr, Niall (2005). Pendulum of War: Three Battles at El Alamein. London: Pimlico. ISBN 978-0-7126-6827-9.
- Beckett, Ian F. W., ed. (2014). Rommel Reconsidered. Mechanicsburg, PA: Stackpole Books. ISBN 978-0-8117-1462-4.
- Beevor, Antony (2012). The Second World War. London: Weidenfeld & Nicolson. ISBN 978-1-78022-564-7.
- Boog, H.; Rahn, W.; Stumpf, R.; Wegner, B. (2001) [1990]. Der globale Krieg: Die Ausweitung zum Weltkrieg und der Wechsel zur Initiative 1941 bis 1943 [Widening of the Conflict into a World War and the Shift of the Initiative 1941–1943]. Das Deutsche Reich und der Zweite Weltkrieg (Germany and the Second World War). Vol. VI. Translated by Osers, Ewald; Brownjohn, John; Crampton, Patricia; Willmot, Louise (eng. trans. Cambridge University Press, London ed.). Stuttgart: Deutsche Verlags-Anstalt for the Militärgeschichtlichen Forschungsamt. ISBN 0-19-822888-0.
  - Stumpf, R. "Part V, The War in the Mediterranean Area 1942–1943: Operations in North Africa and the Central Mediterranean II. The Advance to El Alamein (Operation Theseus)". In Boog et al. (2001), pp. 661–720.
- Brock Katz, David (2017). South Africans versus Rommel: The Untold Story of the Desert War in World War II. Rowman & Littlefield. ISBN 978-0-81176-608-1.
- Butler, Daniel Allen (2015). Field Marshal: The Life and Death of Erwin Rommel. Oxford: Casemate. ISBN 978-1-61200-297-2.
- Churchill, Winston (1948). The Hinge of Fate. Second World War. Vol. IV. New York: Houghton Mifflin Harcourt. OCLC 1375458815.
- Cook, Chris; Ramsden, John, eds. (1997). By-Elections in British Politics. London: Routledge. ISBN 978-1-85728-535-2.
- Ford, Ken (2008). Gazala 1942: Rommel's Greatest Victory. Oxford: Osprey. ISBN 978-1-84603-264-6.
- Fraser, David (1997). Alanbrooke. London: HarperCollins. ISBN 978-0-00-638863-0.
- Grehan, John; Mace, Martin (2015). Operations in North Africa and the Middle East 1939–1942: Tobruk, Crete. Barnsley, South Yorkshire: Pen and Sword Military. ISBN 978-1-78346-217-9.
- Harper, Glyn (2017). The Battle for North Africa: El Alamein and the Turning Point for World War II. Bloomington, IN: Indiana University Press. ISBN 978-0-253-03142-6.
- Hartshorn, Eric P. (1960). Avenge Tobruk. Cape Town: Purnell & Sons. OCLC 26084683.
- Lett, Brian (2014). An Extraordinary Italian Imprisonment: The Brutal Truth of Campo 21, 1942–3. Barnsley: Pen & Sword Military. ISBN 978-1-4738-2269-6.
- McKinstry, Leo (2019). Attlee and Churchill: Allies in War, Adversaries in Peace. London: Atlantic Books. ISBN 978-1-84887-660-6.
- Mitcham, Samuel W. (Jnr.) (2007). Rommel's Desert War: The Life and Death of the Afrika Korps. Mechanicsburg, PA: Stackpole Books. ISBN 978-0-8117-3413-4.
- Nash, N. S. (2013). "Strafer": The Desert General: The Life and Killing of Lieutenant General W. H. E. Gott CB CBE DSO MC. Barnsley: Pen and Sword. ISBN 978-1-47382-976-3.
- Perrett, Bryan (2000). The Changing Face of Battle: From Teutonburger Wald to Desert Storm. London: Orion Books. ISBN 978-0-304-35307-1 – via Archive Foundation.
- Pitt, Barrie (1986). The Crucible of War: Auchinleck's Command. Vol. II. London: Macmillan. ISBN 0-333-41386-5.
- Playfair, I. S. O.; Flynn, F. C.; Molony, C. J. C.; Gleave, T. P. (2004). Butler, J. R. M. (ed.). The Mediterranean and Middle East: British Fortunes Reach Their Lowest Ebb (PDF). The History of the Second World War. Vol. III (pbk. repr. Naval and Military Press, Uckfield ed.). London: HMSO. ISBN 978-1-84574-067-2.
- Playfair, I. S. O.; Molony, C. J. C.; Flynn, Captain F. C.; Gleave, T. P. (1966). Butler, J. R. M. (ed.). The Mediterranean and Middle East: The Destruction of the Axis Forces in Africa. History of the Second World War. Vol. IV. London: HMSO. OCLC 873578837.
- Roberts, Andrew (2009). Masters and Commanders: The Military Geniuses Who Led the West to Victory in World War II (1st ed.). London: Penguin Books. ISBN 978-0-141-02926-9 – via Archive Foundation.
- Smith, Peter (2008). Massacre at Tobruk: The British Assault on Rommel, 1942. Mechanicsburg, PA: Stackpole Books. ISBN 978-0-8117-3474-5.
- Stewart, Adrian (2002). Early Battles of the Eighth Army: Crusader to the Alamein Line. Barnsley, South Yorkshire: Pen & Sword Books. ISBN 978-0-85052-851-0.

=== Journals ===
- Horn, Karen; Katz, David (2016). "The Surrender of Tobruk in 1942: Press Reports and Soldiers' Memories". Scientia Militaria. 44 (1). Stellenbosch University, Faculty of Military Science: 190–208. doi:10.5787/44-1-1167. OCLC 6957239283.
