= Moro River campaign order of battle =

The Moro River campaign order of battle is a listing of the significant formations that were involved in the fighting during the Moro River campaign in December 1943, part of the Italian Campaign of World War II.

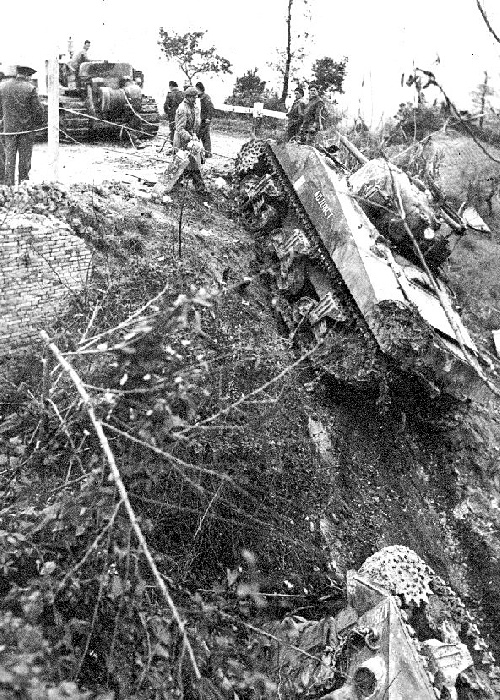
Canadian Sherman tank driven off the road by German mortar fire, 10 Dec 1943

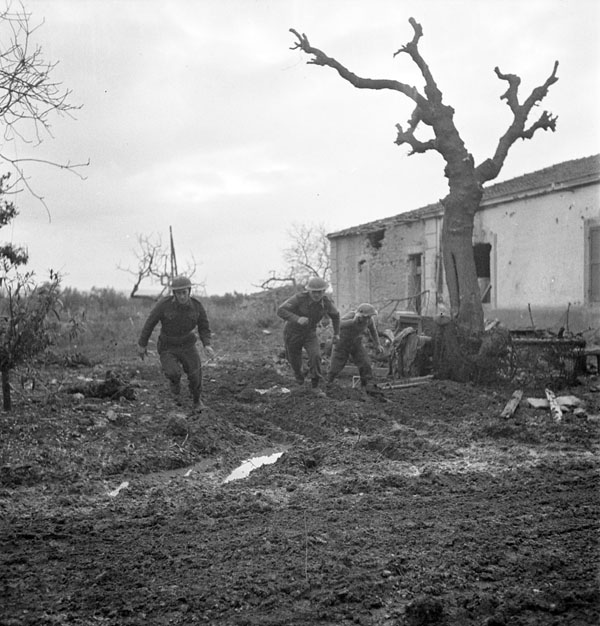
Riflemen of the 48th Highlanders of Canada take cover during German counterattack north of San Leonardo, 10 Dec 1943

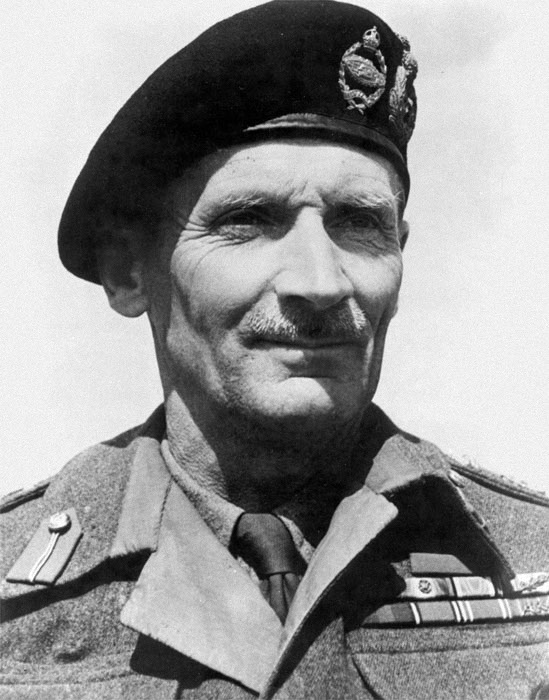
Bernard Law Montgomery

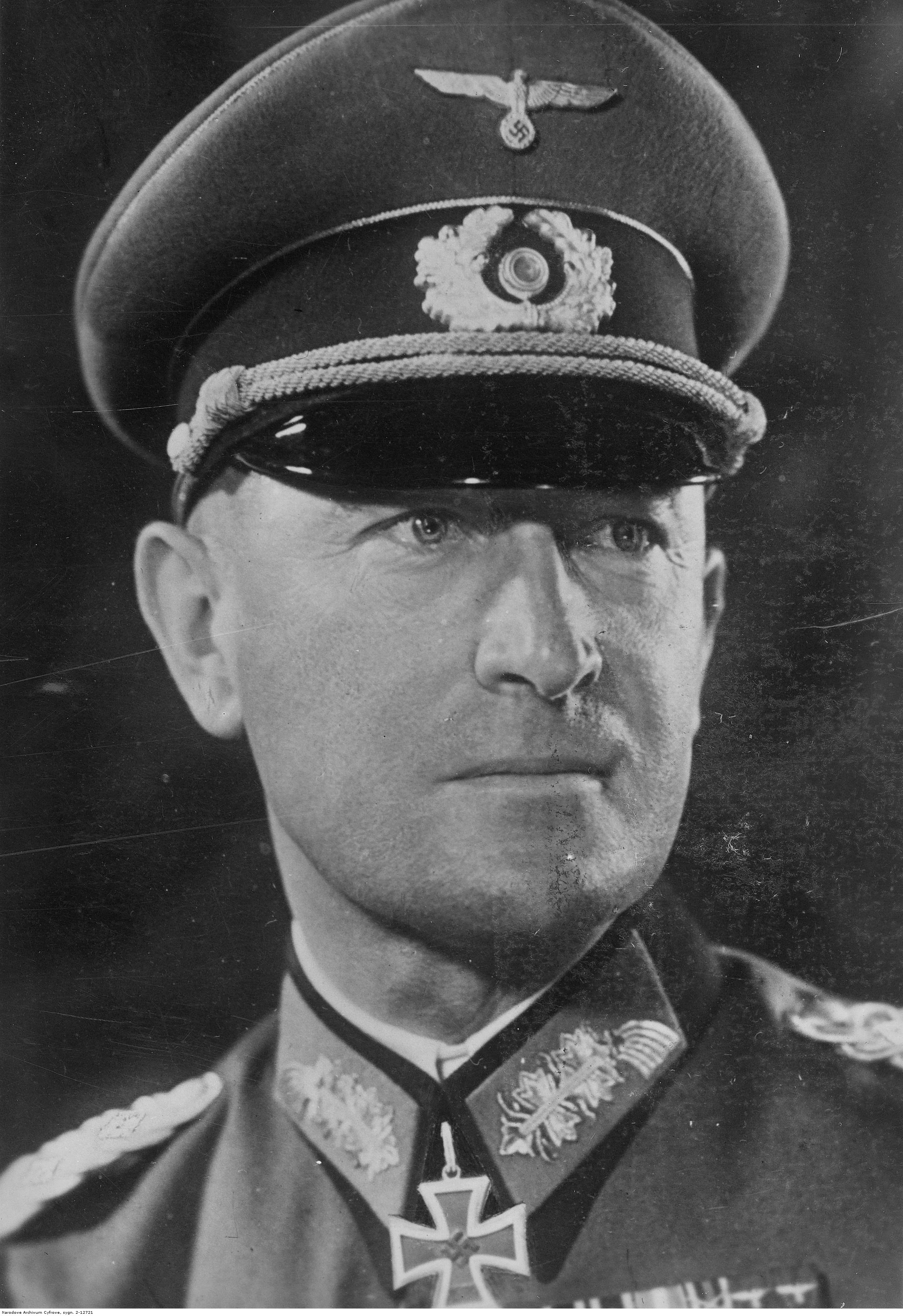
Joachim Lemelsen

== Allied Forces and organisation ==
=== Allied Armies in Italy ===
Commander-in-Chief: General Sir Harold Alexander

==== British Eighth Army ====
General Bernard Law Montgomery

===== V Corps =====
Lieutenant-General Charles Allfrey

1st Canadian Infantry Division
Major-General Christopher Vokes

No. 1 Defense and Employment Platoon (Lorne Scots)
1st Canadian Infantry Brigade

The Royal Canadian Regiment
The Hastings and Prince Edward Regiment
48th Highlanders of Canada

2nd Canadian Infantry Brigade

Princess Patricia’s Canadian Light Infantry
The Seaforth Highlanders of Canada
The Loyal Edmonton Regiment

3rd Canadian Infantry Brigade

Royal 22^{e} Régiment
The Carleton and York Regiment
The West Nova Scotia Regiment

1st Canadian Armoured Brigade

11th Armoured Regiment (The Ontario Regiment)
12th Armoured Regiment (Three Rivers Regiment)
14th Armoured Regiment (The Calgary Regiment)

8th Indian Infantry Division
Major-General Dudley Russell

6th Duke of Connaught's Own (Bengal) Lancers (Note: Reconnaissance regiment)
5th Battalion, (Machine Gun) 5th Mahratta Light Infantry
17th Indian Infantry Brigade

1st Battalion, Royal Fusiliers
1st Battalion, 12th Frontier Force Regiment
1st Battalion, 5th Royal Gurkha Rifles (Frontier Force)

19th Indian Infantry Brigade

1/5th Battalion, Essex Regiment
3rd Battalion, 8th Punjab Regiment
6th Royal Battalion 13th Frontier Force Rifles

21st Indian Infantry Brigade

5th Battalion, Queen's Own Royal West Kent Regiment
1st Battalion, 5th Mahratta Light Infantry
3rd Battalion, 15th Punjab Regiment

4th British Armoured Brigade

44th Royal Tank Regiment
50th Royal Tank Regiment
3rd County of London Yeomanry (Sharpshooters)
2nd Battalion, King's Royal Rifle Corps

===== XIII Corps =====
Lieutenant-General Miles Dempsey

2nd New Zealand Division
Lieutenant-General Bernard Freyberg

4th New Zealand Armoured Brigade

18th Armoured Regiment
19th Armoured Regiment
20th Armoured Regiment

5th New Zealand Infantry Brigade

22nd Battalion
23rd Battalion
28th (Maori) Battalion

6th New Zealand Infantry Brigade

24th Battalion
25th Battalion
26th Battalion
27th Machine Gun Battalion

2nd British Parachute Brigade

4th Parachute Battalion
5th (Scottish) Parachute Battalion
6th (Royal Welch) Parachute Battalion
1st Independent Glider Pilot Squadron, Glider Pilot Regiment

5th British Infantry Division
Major-General Gerard Bucknall

13th Infantry Brigade

2nd Battalion, Cameronians (Scottish Rifles)
2nd Battalion, Royal Inniskilling Fusiliers
2nd Battalion, Wiltshire Regiment

15th Infantry Brigade

1st Battalion, Green Howards
1st Battalion, King's Own Yorkshire Light Infantry
1st Battalion, York and Lancaster Regiment

17th Infantry Brigade

2nd Battalion, Royal Scots Fusiliers
2nd Battalion, Northamptonshire Regiment
6th Battalion, Seaforth Highlanders

5th Reconnaissance Regiment, Reconnaissance Corps
7th Battalion, Cheshire Regiment

== German forces and organisation ==
=== German Army Group C ===
Generalfeldmarschall Albert Kesselring

==== German Tenth Army ====
Lieutenant General (General der Panzertruppe) (Note: In the German army and air force the rank equivalent to lieutenant-general was formally linked to the branch of the army (Heer) or air force (Luftwaffe) in which the officer served: General der Kavallerie (cavalry), General der Artillerie (artillery), General der Infanterie (infantry), General der Panzertruppen (armoured troops), General der Gebirgstruppen (mountain troops), General der Pioniere (engineers), General der Fallschirmtruppen (parachute troops), General der Flieger (aviators), General der Flakartillerie (anti-aircraft) and General der Nachrichtentruppen (communications troops).) Joachim Lemelsen

===== LXXVI Panzer Corps =====
General Traugott Herr

1st Parachute Division
Generalmajor Richard Heidrich

1st Parachute Regiment
3rd Parachute Regiment
4th Parachute Regiment
1st Parachute Artillery Regiment
1st Parachute Anti-tank Battalion

26th Panzer Division
Generalleutnant Smilo Freiherr von Lüttwitz

26th Panzer Regiment
9th Panzergrenadier Regiment
67th Panzergrenadier Regiment
93rd Panzer Artillery Regiment
93rd Anti-tank battalion
26th Reconnaissance Battalion

65th Infantry Division
Generalmajor Hellmuth Pfeifer

145th Grenadier Regiment
146th Grenadier Regiment
147th Grenadier Regiment
165th Artillery Regiment
165th Anti-tank Battalion
165th Reconnaissance Battalion

90th Panzergrenadier Division
Generalleutnant Carl-Hans Lungershausen (thru 20 Dec)
Oberst Ernst-Günther Baade (from 21 Dec)

155th Panzergrenadier Regiment
200th Panzergrenadier Regiment
361st Panzergrenadier Regiment
190th Artillery Regiment
190th Panzer Battalion
1/190th Anti-tank Battalion
