= Hotel Tobruk =

Hotel in Tobruk, Libya

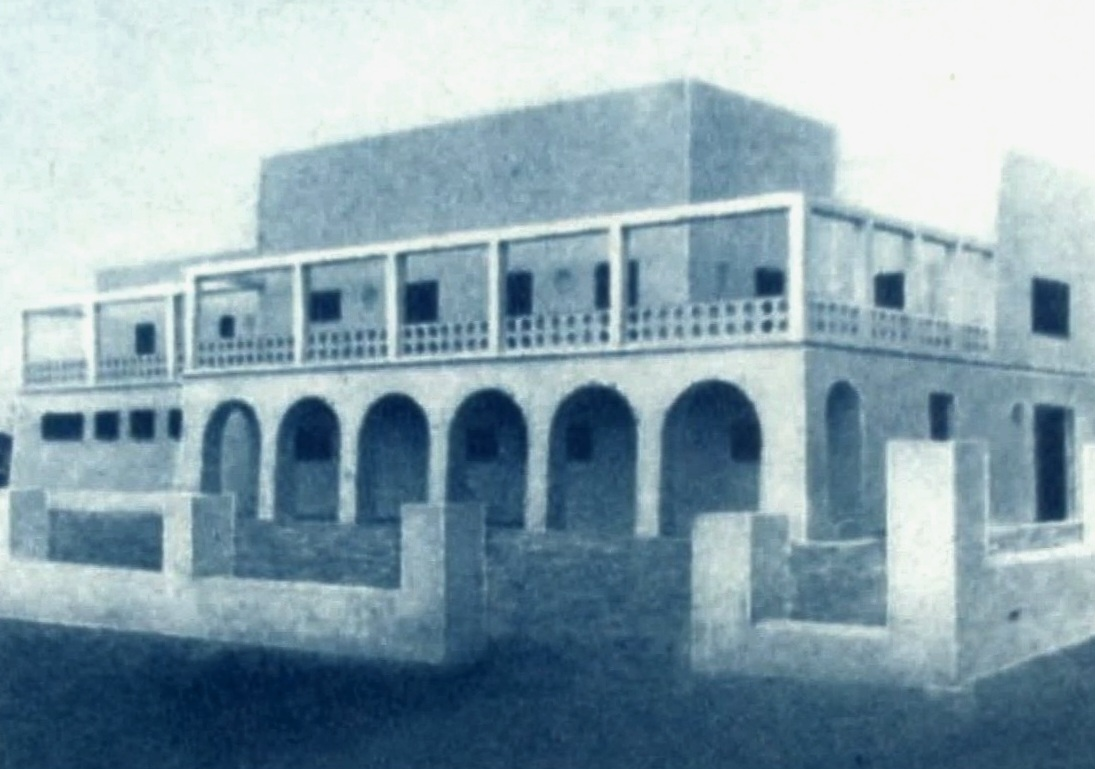
- Interactive map of the Hotel Tobruk area

General information
- Location: Tobruk, Libya
- Coordinates: 32.0803738°N 23.9723561°E
- Opening: 1937

Hotel Tobruk is a historic hotel in Tobruk, Libya.

== History ==
The hotel Tobruk was built in 1937. It was located at the entrance of the port, the last stop before the Egyptian border.

It provided shelter for Erwin Rommel during the Siege of Tobruk in World War II.

== Description ==
The hotel Tobruk had 20 rooms and an air-conditioning system.
