= Operation Acrobat =

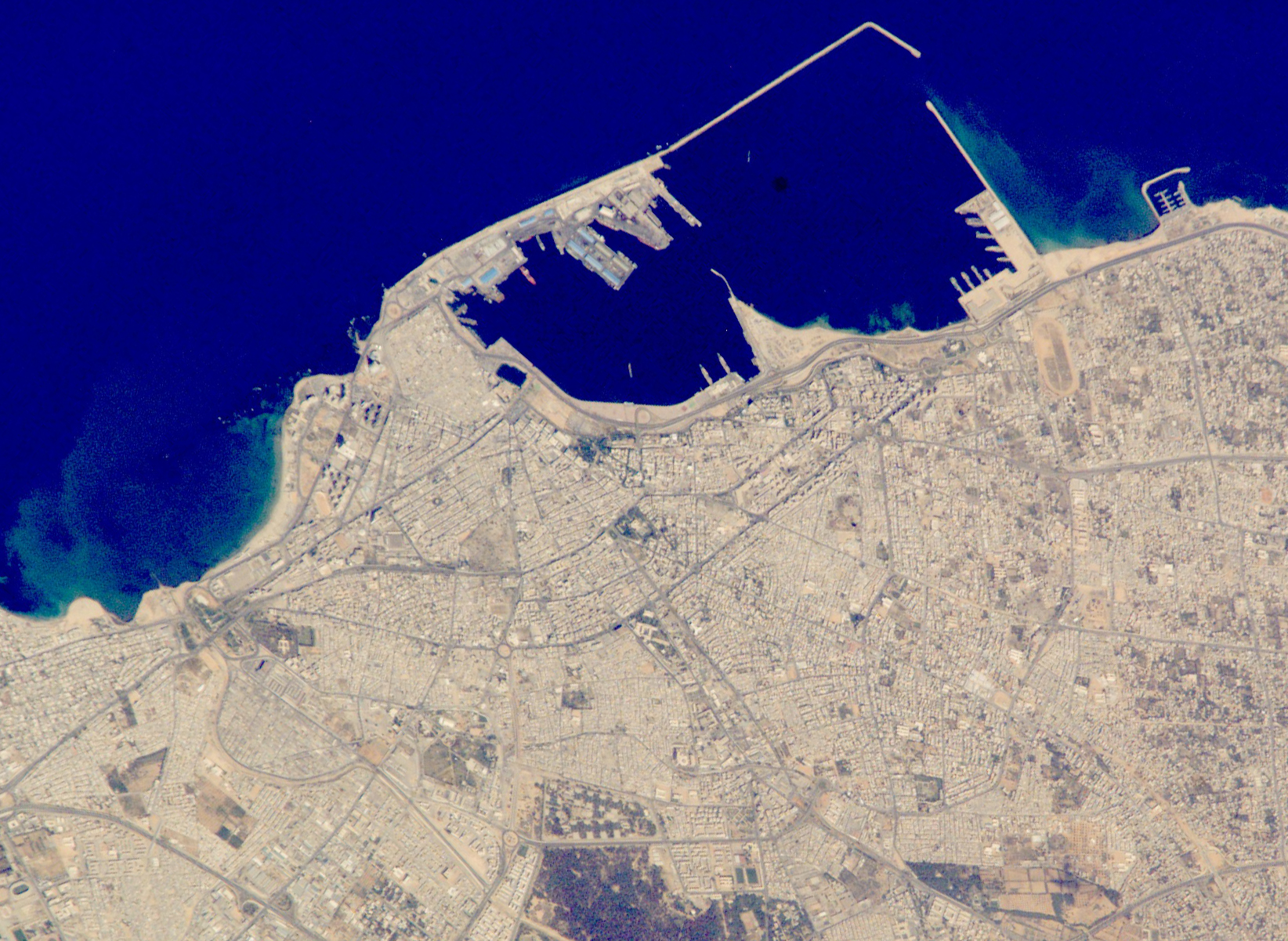
Modern NASA satellite photograph of the city of Tripoli and its port

Operation Acrobat was a proposed British attack on Tripoli in 1942. It was discussed on 9 and 13 January 1942 by the Chiefs of Staff and representatives of Middle East Command (General Sir Claude Auchinleck). The Chief of the Imperial General Staff, General Alan Brooke, wondered if the operation "was on" because of the delays in the capture of Cyrenaica (following Allied victory in Operation Crusader) because it could not be carried out for six weeks, during which Axis reinforcements could flow into Africa from Italy. Brooke had a low opinion of Auchinleck's staff, though not of Auchinleck; the situation in the Far East was already serious (Japan had been at war with Britain and the US since December 1941, quickly bringing about the Fall of Singapore, the Japanese invasion of Burma and Indian Ocean raid). The planning of Operation Acrobat is depicted by a propaganda film Tunisian Victory (1944). Acrobat was intended as an accompanying operation to Operation Gymnast, an Allied invasion of Vichy French North Africa (Morocco and Algeria), which Churchill was trying to persuade the American leaders to agree. Acrobat ceased to be feasible after the British defeat at the Battle of Gazala, the retreat to El Alamein in Egypt and the First Battle of Alamein but Gymnast, renamed Operation Torch, began in November 1942.
