= George William Symes =

British military officer (1896–1980)

Major-General George William Symes CB MC & Bar
- Born: 12 January 1896; Minterne Magna, Dorset, England
- Died: 26 August 1980 (aged 84); Adelaide, South Australia
- Burial place: Centennial Park Cemetery, Adelaide, Australia
- Military career
- Allegiance: United Kingdom
- Branch: British Army
- Service years: 1915–1949
- Rank: Major-General
- Service number: 9517
- Units: Durham Light Infantry; Machine Gun Corps; York and Lancaster Regiment
- Commands: 43rd (Wessex) Infantry Division; 70th Infantry Division; 8th Infantry Brigade
- Conflicts: First World War; Arab revolt in Palestine; Second World War
- Awards: Companion of the Order of the Bath; Military Cross & Bar; Mentioned in Despatches
- Other work: Private secretary to the Governor of South Australia

Major-General George William Symes, CB, MC & Bar (12 January 1896 – 26 August 1980) was a senior British Army officer who served in the First World War, in which he was twice awarded the Military Cross. During the Second World War he commanded the 70th Infantry Division in India, and was deputy commander of the Special Force, commonly known as the Chindits, in Burma. He was deputy commander of the lines of communication of the 21st Army Group from May to November 1944, and then commanded the lines of communication in South East Asia Command. In June 1945, he became general officer commanding in Southern Burma.

In 1949, he retired from the British Army and emigrated to Australia, where he became one of the first directors of Santos from its initial incorporation in Adelaide on 18 March 1954 until he retired in 1978. He was private secretary to two South Australian Governors, Sir Robert George and Sir Edric Bastyan.

== Early life and First World War ==
George William Symes was born in Minterne Magna, Dorset, on 12 January 1896, the son of George Symes, a sergeant major in the Royal Artillery, and his wife Eliza née Paulley. He attended Bridport Secondary School.

After the outbreak of the First World War in August 1914, he enlisted in the British Army. He entered the Royal Military College, Sandhurst and was commissioned as a second lieutenant in the Durham Light Infantry on 14 June 1915. On 22 February 1916, he was seconded to the Machine Gun Corps, and was sent to the Western Front the next day. He was assigned to the 69th Machine Gun Company, part of the 23rd Division. He was promoted to lieutenant on 1 November 1916. Later that month he was awarded the Military Cross (MC). His citation read:

For conspicuous gallantry in action. He advanced along a communication trench and single-handed captured 20 of the enemy. Later, he fought his guns with great courage and skill, and carried out a valuable reconnaissance.

On 1 July 1917, he received a commission in the Regular Army as a lieutenant in the York and Lancaster Regiment, with seniority backdated to 31 January 1917. In November 1917, his unit was transferred to the Italian Front. On 1 January 1918, he was awarded a Bar to his Military Cross. He was promoted to acting captain on 3 April 1918, and acting major on 8 November 1918, three days before the Great War came to an end with the signing of the armistice of 11 November 1918.

== Between the wars ==
On 1 April 1919, with the war over, Symes stayed in the army and reverted to his permanent rank of lieutenant. He was promoted to captain again on 16 November 1923, with his date of rank backdated to 1 January 1923. Serving mainly on his regimental duties through the first half of the interwar period, Symes was selected to attend the Staff College, Camberley, on 20 January 1931, and was promoted to brevet major on 1 January 1932. His fellow students there included men such as John Nichols, William Gott, Miles Dempsey, George Hopkinson and Maurice Chilton. On completing the course he was posted to the Royal School of Artillery as a General Staff Officer (GSO) on 15 January 1933. He then became a brigade major with the 14th Infantry Brigade, then commanded by Brigadier Henry Maitland-Makgill-Crichton, on 1 November 1934, The brigade, part of the 5th Infantry Division, was then stationed in North Yorkshire before being posted to Palestine on internal security duties during the 1936–1939 Arab revolt. Symes held this post until being sent to India as a GSO (Grade 2) on 6 September 1937. He was finally promoted to the substantive rank of major on 1 August 1938, nearly twenty years after he had first held the rank, and then to brevet lieutenant colonel on 1 January 1939. On 11 December 1939, three months after the Second World War began, he married an Australian woman, Katherine Bellairs Lucas, in a ceremony at St John's Anglican Church in Colaba, Bombay, India.

== Second World War ==
Symes returned to England in April 1940, seven months after the outbreak of the Second World War. He was promoted to the acting rank of lieutenant colonel, and was appointed a GSO (Grade 1). His rank of lieutenant colonel became temporary in July 1940. He was assistant adjutant and quartermaster general (AA&QMG) of the 43rd (Wessex) Infantry Division. In November 1940, he was promoted to acting brigadier as commander of the 8th Infantry Brigade. As part of the 3rd Infantry Division, commanded by Major General James Gammell, it was a mobile reserve tasked with counter-attacking an invasion attempt. On 27 June 1941, he took over Brian Horrocks as Brigadier General Staff (BGS) of Eastern Command. His substantive rank became lieutenant colonel on 30 May 1941, and colonel on 1 January 1942.

On 1 January 1942, Symes became an acting major general. He became general officer commanding (GOC) of the 70th Infantry Division on 18 February 1942. The division was then stationed in Syria, but was under orders to move to India. In August 1943, Major General Orde Wingate persuaded the leaders at the Quebec Conference to expand his Special Force, commonly known as the Chindits. In order to do so, the 70th Infantry Division was broken up. Although Symes was senior to Wingate in age, rank and length of service, he agreed to serve as Wingate's deputy. At their first meeting, Wingate asked Symes if he had "faith in his methods". Symes replied that "If I hadn't, I wouldn't be meeting you today."

After Wingate was killed in a plane crash on 24 March 1944, the GOC Fourteenth Army, Lieutenant General William "Bill" Slim appointed Brigadier Walter Lentaigne, a fellow Gurkha officer, as Wingate's successor. Symes spoke with Slim's superior, General George Giffard, the commander of the 11th Army Group. Giffard would not overrule Slim, but he did inform the Chief of the Imperial General Staff (CIGS, the professional head of the British Army), Field Marshal Sir Alan Brooke, that Symes' supersession was due to the unique requirements of Chindit operations and not a reflection on his ability as a commander. Symes then asked to be relieved, and Slim obliged.

Reduced to his permanent rank of colonel, Symes returned to the United Kingdom. On 21 May 1944, he was appointed deputy commander of the lines of communication for the 21st Army Group, with the rank of brigadier. He served in this capacity in the Battle of Normandy and the Allied advance from Paris to the Rhine. He was mentioned in despatches on 10 May 1945 for his services.

In November 1944, Symes returned to India as commander of the Lines of Communication in South East Asia Command (SEAC). In June 1945, he became GOC in Southern Burma. His period in command in Burma included the final Japanese surrender, and the early push for Burmese independence. For his wartime services in India and Burma, Symes was made a Companion of the Order of the Bath on 17 January 1946, and was mentioned in despatches on 19 September 1946.

== Later life ==
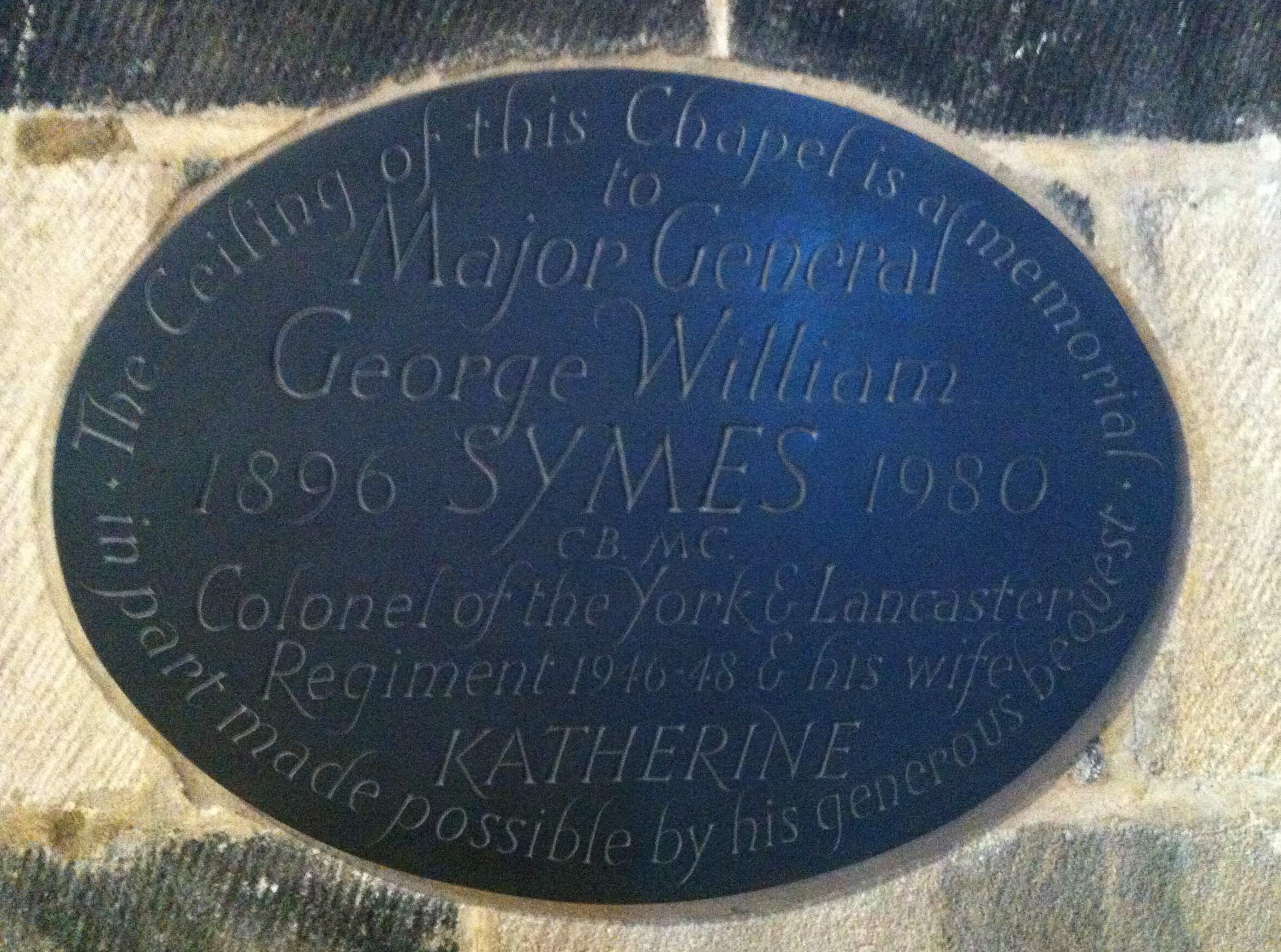
Memorial to George and Katherine Symes in Sheffield Cathedral.

Returning to the United Kingdom, Symes was appointed GOC South Western District on 20 March 1946, at the same time becoming Colonel of the York and Lancaster Regiment. When the 43rd Division was re-formed in April 1947, he became its GOC as well.

Symes retired from the army on 9 April 1949, and emigrated to Australia, where he settled in Adelaide. He served as one of the first directors of Santos (South Australia-Northern Territory Oil Search), an oil and gas company, from its initial incorporation in Adelaide on 18 March 1954 until he retired in 1978. The company acquired exploration leases to 125,000 square miles (320,000 km^{2}) in South Australia and Queensland.

From 1956 to 1964, Symes was private secretary to the governor of South Australia, first Sir Robert George until 1960, and then Sir Edric Bastyan, under whom he had served in South East Asia Command during the war. He was also president of the South Australian branch of the Royal Geographical Society of Australasia from 1956 to 1964. He wrote articles on the history of South Australia, including four for the Australian Dictionary of Biography. He commenced writing a biography of the astronomer Sir Charles Todd, but it was never finished. His first wife, Katherine, died in 1961. He married Kathleen Cavenagh Champion de Crespigny née Cudmore, the granddaughter of J. F. Cudmore at St Peter's Church of England in Box Hill, Victoria, on 30 March 1967. He had no children from either of his marriages.

Symes died in St Andrew's Presbyterian Hospital in Adelaide on 26 August 1980, and was buried in Centennial Park Cemetery. He was survived by his wife. A memorial to George and Katherine Symes was dedicated in the chapel of the York and Lancaster Regiment in Sheffield Cathedral in 1982. His papers are in the State Library of South Australia, except for his wartime diaries, which are in the Imperial War Museum.

== Bibliography ==
- Bidwell, Shelford (1980). The Chindit War: Stilwell, Wingate, and the Campaign in Burma, 1944. New York: Macmillan. ISBN 9780025106000.
- McLynn, Frank (2011). The Burma Campaign: Disaster into Triumph, 1942–45. New Haven: Yale University Press. ISBN 9780300171624.
- Playfair, Major-General I. S. O.; Flynn, Captain F. C.; Molony, Brigadier C. J. C.; Gleave, Group Captain T. P. (1960). Butler, J. R. M. (ed.). The Mediterranean and Middle East: British Fortunes reach their Lowest Ebb (September 1941 to September 1942). History of the Second World War United Kingdom Military Series. Vol. III. London: HMSO. ISBN 978-1-845-74067-2.
- Rooney, David. (2006). Mad Mike: a life of Brigadier Michael Calvert. Barnsley: Pen & Sword. ISBN 9781844155071.
- Smart, Nick (2005). Biographical Dictionary of British Generals of the Second World War. Barnsley: Pen And Sword Books. ISBN 1-84415-049-6.

Military offices
Preceded by Ronald Scobie	GOC 70th Infantry Division; 1942–1943	Post disbanded
Honorary titles
Preceded by Michael Barker	Colonel of the York and Lancaster Regiment; 1946–1948	Succeeded by C. G. Robins
Military offices
Preceded by John Churcher	GOC 43rd (Wessex) Infantry Division; 1947–1948	Succeeded by Charles Coleman
