= 32nd Army Tank Brigade =

Armored brigade of the British Army during World War II

- Formation sign of the 32nd Army Tank Brigade
- Active: 1941–1942
- Country: United Kingdom
- Branch: British Army
- Type: Armoured warfare
- Role: Infantry support
- Size: Brigade
- Engagements: Western Desert Campaign

The 32nd Army Tank Brigade was an armoured brigade of the British Army created during the Second World War. It was formed, under the command of Brigadier Arthur Cecil Willison, in Egypt on 15 September 1941. The brigade HQ was sent to Tobruk to take command of all Royal Armoured Corps units stationed there and was attached to the 70th Infantry Division for Operation Crusader, where Captain Philip Gardner of the 4th Royal Tank Regiment was awarded the Victoria Cross. In June 1942, during the Battle of Gazala, a composite brigade was formed in Tobruk with surviving elements of the 1st Army Tank Brigade, which surrendered on 22 June after the fall of Tobruk. The brigade was not reformed.

== Order of battle ==
The 32nd Army Tank Brigade was composed of

- 1st Royal Tank Regiment (from 18 September 1941, left 21 January 1942)
- 4th Royal Tank Regiment (from 19 September 1941)
- 7th Royal Tank Regiment (from 18 September 1941, left 22 January 1942, rejoined 10 April 1942)

== See also ==
- British Armoured formations of World War II
- List of British brigades of the Second World War
