= 70th Infantry Division (United Kingdom) =

WWII British Army division

- Historian Michael Chappell wrote that "The red four-pointed star chosen as a divisional sign for the 6th (and 70th) was painted on vehicles, etc., but was probably never worn" on the uniform of the soldiers.
- Active: 10 October 1941 – 24 November 1943
- Country: United Kingdom
- Branch: British Army
- Type: Infantry
- Size: War establishment strength 17,298 men (Note: This is the war establishment, the on-paper strength, of an infantry division formed during or after 1941, but before 1944; for information on how division sizes changed during the war, see British Army during the Second World War.); During the siege of Tobruk: ~28,000 men
- Engagements: Siege of Tobruk; Operation Crusader
- Battle honours: Defence of Tobruk; Tobruk, 1941

Commanders
- Notable commanders: Ronald Scobie; George Symes

The 70th Infantry Division was an infantry division of the British Army that fought during the Western Desert Campaign of the Second World War. What would become the 70th Division originated with the 7th Infantry Division, which was formed in 1938 to serve in the British Mandate of Palestine during the Arab Revolt. This division then transferred to Egypt on the outbreak of the Second World War and soon became the 6th Infantry Division, which went on to take part in the Battle of Crete and the Syria–Lebanon Campaign. On 10 October 1941, the 6th Division was re-created as the 70th Infantry Division, in an attempt to deceive Axis intelligence concerning the strength of British forces in the Middle East.

The Royal Navy transported the division to Tobruk from 19 September to 25 October, in a politically controversial move to relieve the mainly Australian garrison which had been defending the port for almost seven months, since the beginning of the siege of Tobruk. Under daily aerial and artillery attacks, the division defended the port and conducted nightly offensive patrols against German and Italian positions. On 18 November, the British Eighth Army launched Operation Crusader. The division was tasked with breaking out of Tobruk, following the destruction of the Axis armoured forces. Following unexpected early success, the division began its attacks on 21 November, before the armoured formations of Germans and Italians had been defeated. Heavy fighting soon followed as the division captured several well-defended and dug-in German and Italian strong points. The looming threat of the Axis tanks ended the break-out offensive the following day. Renewed fighting on 26 November saw the division link up with the approaching New Zealand Division, cutting the Axis lines of communication. In response, the Germans launched several counter-attacks to throw back the 70th Division from the territory they had gained. The failure of these attacks had a lasting strategic impact on Operation Crusader; the Axis forces began their retreat and lifted the siege of Tobruk. Two men—from units attached to the division—were awarded the Victoria Cross for their actions during Operation Crusader.

Following the fighting at Tobruk, the division was withdrawn from the front and placed in reserve. When Japan entered the war, the division was transferred to India. It was considered the most experienced and best trained British formation available in Asia. In India, the division formed a reserve to counter possible Japanese landings while it trained in jungle warfare. It also served as a police force, protecting railways and being used to suppress civil disobedience caused by the Quit India Movement. While it was requested that the division be sent to the front line in Burma, it was instead transferred to Special Force, commonly known as the Chindits. Such a move was opposed by the highest military commanders in India and Burma, and proved controversial with the troops themselves. Despite their pleas, the division was broken up and officially ceased to exist on 24 November 1943. Historian Woodburn Kirby and Lieutenant-General William Slim (who led the British troops in Burma) believed that the division could have had a greater impact against the Japanese had it been retained as a single formation.

== Background ==
=== Arab Revolt in Palestine ===
In 1936, the Arab Revolt broke out in the British Mandate of Palestine. British troops were dispatched, ending the first phase of the war by the close of the year. Fighting soon resumed and reached its zenith during the summer of 1938. With rising tensions in Europe, the British began to withdraw troops from Palestine for use elsewhere. The conclusion of the Munich Agreement—on 30 September 1938—calmed the rising tensions in Europe and averted war, allowing the British to resume their military build-up in Palestine.

The 7th Infantry Division was formed the following month and placed under the command of Major-General Richard O'Connor. The division was deployed to Palestine on internal security duties as part of a build-up of 18,500 men in the region. This force then began to suppress the revolt. Meanwhile, Palestinian guerrillas had overrun the Old City of Jerusalem. O'Connor's men proceeded to sweep the area, declaring the Old City free of militants on 19 October. The same day, the division seized Acre and by the end of the month were clearing Jaffa of rebels. Many Palestinians were detained and rebel activity significantly dropped off in the area. In the north, the 8th Infantry Division, under Major-General Bernard Montgomery, and Special Night Squads engaged in counter-terror operations, with O'Connor writing that one brigadier "always encouraged his men to be brutal". General Officer Commanding British Forces in Palestine and Trans-Jordan Robert Haining wrote in late 1938 that "unnecessary violence, vindictiveness ..., [and] killing in cold blood" had to be curbed. O'Connor was likewise opposed to the measures in the north, and wrote "harshness and unnecessary violence on the part of our soldiers" had to be curbed. During the operation in Jerusalem, only four to nineteen guerrillas were killed. In early 1939, the revolt finally came to an end. (Note: Bernard Montgomery's 8th Infantry Division launched a major operation that defeated the rebels on a military level. On a political level, the British Government drew up the White Paper of 1939 conceding to the demands of the Arab Higher Committee: "Self-government—an Arab-controlled Palestine—would be implemented within 10 years and in the meantime Jewish immigration would cease after five years.")

=== Second World War ===
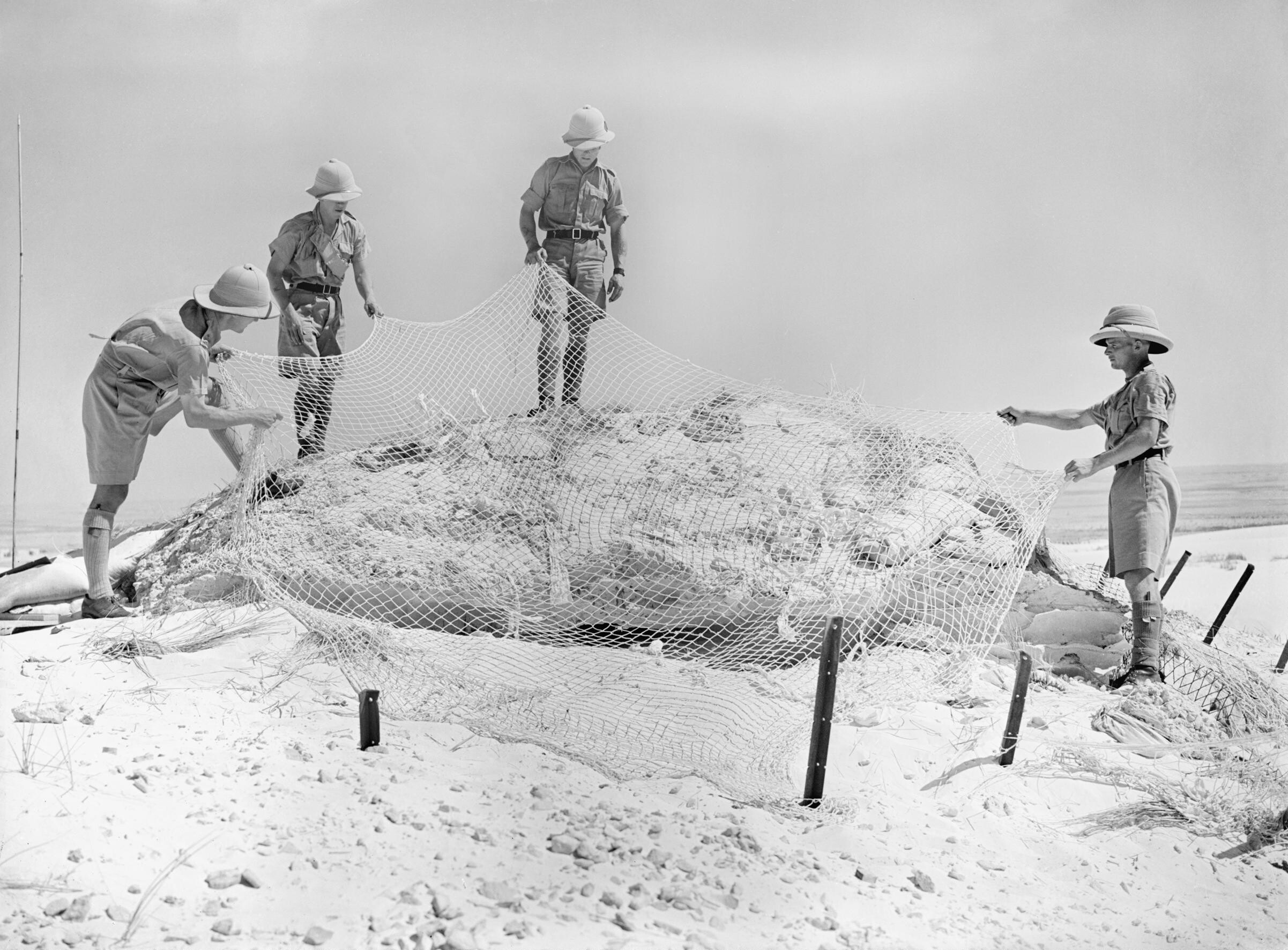
Infantry camouflage a gun position at Mersa Matruh.

On 1 September 1939, the Second World War began with the German Invasion of Poland, and two days later the United Kingdom declared war on Germany. On 31 August, the headquarters of the 7th Infantry Division gave up command of its troops. O'Connor and the divisional staff then left Jerusalem bound for Cairo, Egypt. From Cairo, the men moved forward to Mersa Matruh arriving on 7 September. The headquarters was then assigned all troops based there, with the exception of the 7th Armoured Division. The British Official Historian, I. S. O. Playfair, comments that this decision was undertaken to relieve the burden on Lieutenant-General Henry Maitland Wilson, GOC British Troops in Egypt, of "direct control of operations which had been his in addition to the command of all troops in Egypt". Due to the logistical problems in maintaining substantial forces across the Western Desert and on the Libya–Egypt border, Mersa Matruh was the forward British base of operations and supplied by rail. Positioned 200 miles (320 km) west of Alexandria and 120 miles (190 km) from the border, the location had been chosen to shield forward Royal Air Force (RAF) landing strips behind it and to defend the Nile Delta. Mersa Matruh also offered the British the strategy of drawing Italian or other forces forward to them, to allow a counter-attack after they ran into supply difficulties.

On 3 November, the division was renamed the 6th Infantry Division. The division initially commanded rear area personnel and the 22nd Infantry Brigade. Over the coming months, the 14th and 16th Infantry Brigades were assigned to the division as they arrived in Egypt from Palestine. On 10 June 1940, Italy declared war upon Britain and her allies. Seven days later, the 6th Infantry Division was dissolved and its headquarters transformed into the command staff of a corps known as the Western Desert Force (WDF). In early September 1940, Italian forces based in Libya invaded Egypt. Three months later, the WDF began a limited raid, Operation Compass. The raid succeeded and was expanded; in two months the WDF advanced 500 miles (800 km), occupied the Italian province of Cyrenaica and destroyed the Italian 10th Army. The operation was halted in February 1941 to give priority to the Battle of Greece.

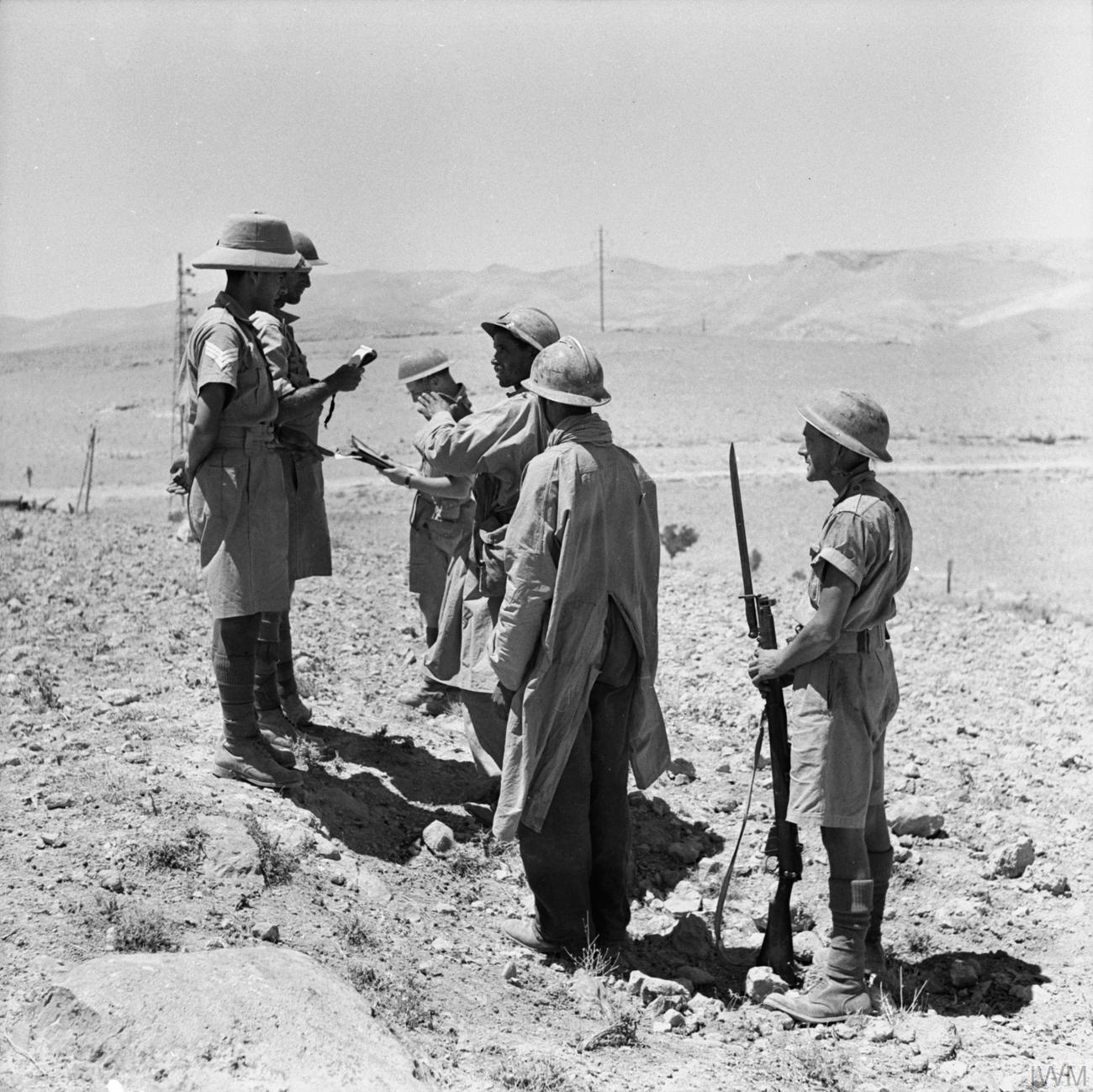
British infantry question captured Vichy French troops, near Damascus.

On 17 February 1941, the 6th Infantry Division was reformed in Egypt. It was initially made up of the 16th and the 22nd Guards Brigade, who were based in Egypt, but lacked artillery or other supporting arms. The 22nd Guards Brigade was soon withdrawn, and the division was assigned the 14th and 23rd Infantry Brigade. Here, the division trained for amphibious operations in the Dodecanese. The deteriorating situation in North Africa, which saw General Erwin Rommel's Afrika Korps retake the territory lost by the Italians during Operation Compass, resulted in the 6th Infantry Division being reassigned to defend Egypt. The division had been earmarked to deploy to Crete, where the 14th Brigade had been based since November, but instead took up defensive positions at Mersa Matruh. The 14th Brigade later defended the airfield at Heraklion during the Battle of Crete when 2,000 German paratroopers landed in the area on 20 May. The Germans were able to penetrate into Heraklion, before Anglo-Greek forces cleared the town following heavy fighting. Despite many losses, the paratroopers were able to dig-in on ridges around the brigade's positions. Due to the deteriorating situation on Crete, the 14th Brigade was evacuated by Royal Navy ships on 29 May. En route to Egypt, they were repeatedly bombed by the Luftwaffe, suffering 800 casualties.

By late April, British attention had shifted to the Middle East due to the Anglo-Iraqi War, although the situation was resolved by the end of May. A greater concern was that German and Italian forces had intervened in Iraq, using bases in Vichy Syria. With Germans and Italians threatening to gain full control of the French territory, thus jeopardising the British position in the Middle East, the Allies invaded Syria (Operation Exporter) on 8 June. In the face of stiff resistance from the Vichy French, the British realised that reinforcements were needed. On 13 June, the 6th Infantry Division (with two infantry brigades) was ordered to reinforce the effort. The leading elements of the 16th Infantry Brigade arrived on 17 June and captured Kuneitra. The 23rd Infantry Brigade arrived on 28 June. The division then took part in the Battle of Damascus. The campaign ended on 14 July and the division remained in Syria.

== Operational history ==
=== Tobruk ===
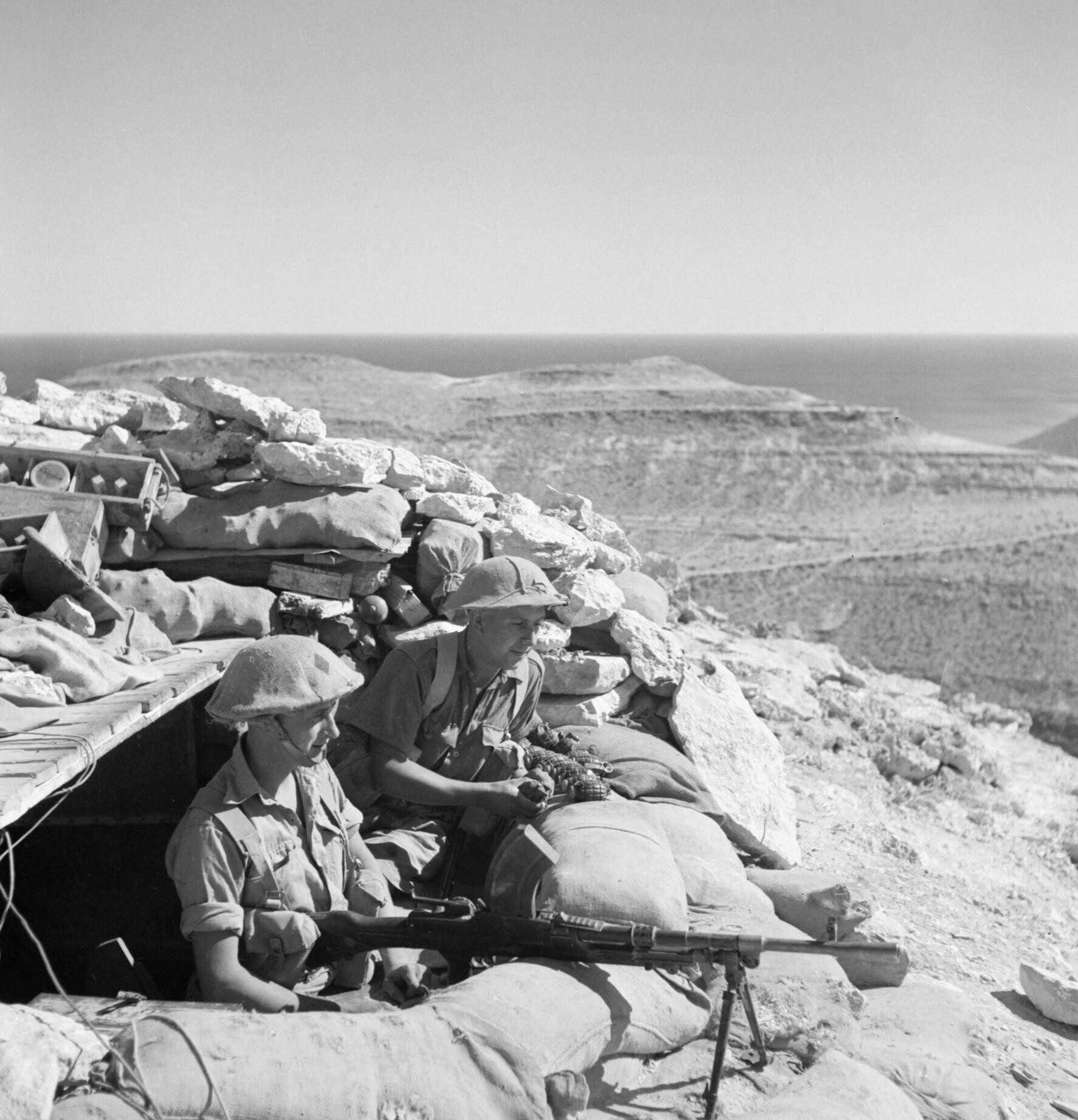
Men of the 2nd Battalion, Leicestershire Regiment, during the siege of Tobruk, 1941.

Operation Sonnenblume, the counter-attack launched by Italian troops and the Afrika Korps across Cyrenaica, had forced the British and Commonwealth forces into retreat during March and April. Richard O'Connor—now General Officer Commanding British Troops Egypt—had been captured. The Australian 9th Infantry Division fell back to the fortress port of Tobruk and the remaining British and Commonwealth forces withdrew a further 100 miles (160 km) east to Sollum on the Libyan–Egyptian border.

These moves initiated the siege of Tobruk. Although isolated by land, the garrison was supplied by the Royal Navy and the first Axis attacks failed to take the port. This failure was significant; Erwin Rommel's front line positions at Sollum were at the end of an extended supply chain that stretched back to Tripoli and was threatened by the Tobruk garrison. Besieging Tobruk also required a substantial commitment of troops and prevented Rommel from making further advances into Egypt. By maintaining possession of Tobruk, the Allies regained the initiative.

Australian policy for the use of the Second Australian Imperial Force (2AIF) was to have all forces concentrated in an Australian Corps, under Australian command. By June, Australian troops were dispersed throughout the Middle East, Cyprus and North Africa. The subject had been of concern to the Australian Government since 18 April. The issue came to a head on 18 July, when Lieutenant-General Thomas Blamey (commander of the 2AIF, and deputy commander Middle East Command) wrote a letter to General Claude Auchinleck, the new commander of all forces in North Africa and the Middle East, stating "the agreed policy for the employment of Australian troops between the British and Australian Governments is that the ... troops should operate as a single force." Blamey also highlighted that the troops in Tobruk were showing a decline in health due to the siege and that the attrition rate they were suffering would result in "considerable" casualties, if they were not replaced by fresh troops. This caused a diplomatic row between Winston Churchill and the Australian Government that continued after the war, and turned what Graham Freudenberg called a "reasonable request in July" into "a risky one in October".

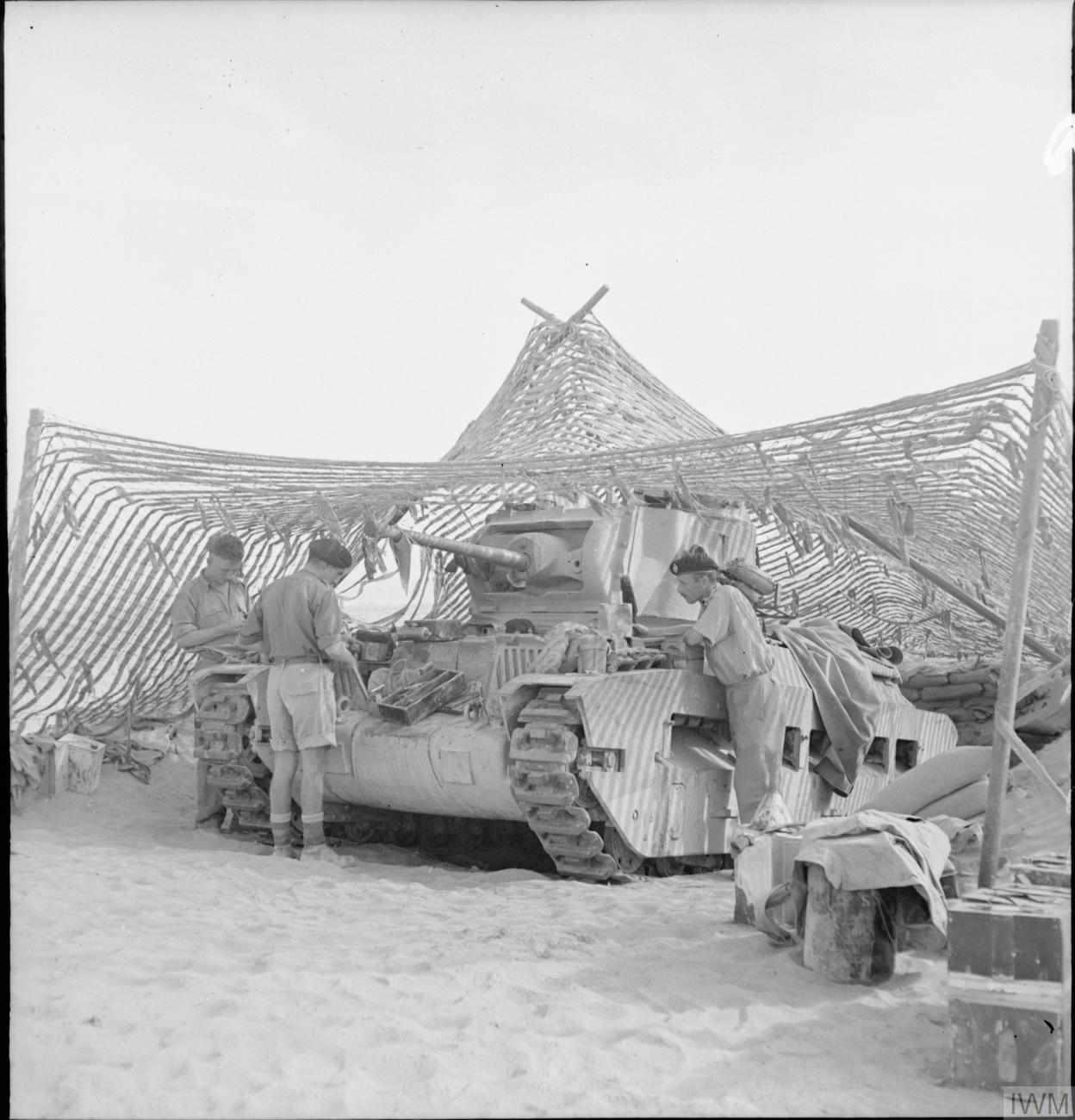
A Matilda and its crew at Tobruk

The relief of the garrison and replacement with fresh troops were finally agreed. The first stage saw the 1st Polish Carpathian Brigade replace the 18th Australian Infantry Brigade. Next came the 6th Infantry Division's 16th Infantry Brigade, during late September, with elements of the 32nd Army Tank Brigade, in lieu of the 24th Australian Infantry Brigade. On 10 October, for security reasons and in an attempt to confuse Axis intelligence as to when the division was fully redeployed, the 6th Infantry Division was renamed the 70th Infantry Division. Major-General Ronald Scobie was given command.

The final stage of the relief effort took place between 12 and 25 October. The remaining elements of the 70th Division were transported into Tobruk and the remaining Australian garrison (save the 2/13th Battalion and elements of the 2/15th Battalion) were shipped out. In total, the relief effort evacuated 47,280 men (including prisoners) and brought in 34,113 men; it also brought the garrison's armour strength to 126 tanks. On 22 October, the 32nd Army Tank Brigade was attached to the 70th Division. With the relief effort over, command of the garrison was given to Scobie. Investing Tobruk were some German infantry and the Italian 27th Infantry Division Brescia, 25th Infantry Division Bologna, 17th Infantry Division Pavia, and 102nd Motorised Division Trento.

Prior to their withdrawal, the Australians briefed the incoming British troops. The men of the division then took over from the Australians and settled into their task of defending Tobruk, with what the Black Watch Regiment described as a sense that it was "the main post of honour open to the British fighting man." The soldiers' lives were uncomfortable: fresh water was scarce, washing was a luxury and done in sea-water, razor blades were in short supply, meals were basic and sand storms were common. The troops were engaged in a dull routine: daily artillery bombardments by both sides, Axis air raids every night on Tobruk harbour, and for the infantry, nightly patrols. These patrols, described by the Black Watch as "pure 1914–18 warfare", varied from reconnaissance missions—to identify what was located at a certain position—to capturing enemy soldiers and large scale trench raids on enemy positions. Auchinleck and Rommel had planned offensive operations simultaneously. The latter sought to capture Tobruk, aiming to launch an assault during the period of 20 November – 4 December, whereas Auchinleck planned to relieve Tobruk with a slightly earlier start date.

=== Operation Crusader ===
Battle area of Operation Crusader

Auchinleck planned for XXX Corps (under Lieutenant-General Willoughby Norrie), containing the British armour, to advance around the undefended southern Axis flank, south of Sidi Omar, before moving towards Tobruk and engaging the German and Italian armoured units in battle. Once the Axis armour was defeated, the British force would attack towards Tobruk aiming to capture Sidi Rezegh, while the garrison broke out aiming to capture Ed Duda, cutting the enemy lines of communication. (Note: Once the break-out had occurred, the garrison would come under the command of XXX Corps.) On 18 November, the Eighth Army began the offensive. Rommel, believing the attack was an attempt to hinder his own plans to assault Tobruk, did little to counter the British offensive. This led to the capture of Sidi Rezegh and the suggestion that the 70th Division should begin its attack on 21 November, before the Axis armour had been defeated. The plan to break out of Tobruk had been well rehearsed; the 2nd Battalion, York and Lancaster Regiment, 2nd Black Watch, 2nd King's Own Royal Regiment (Lancaster) and 2nd Queen's Royal Regiment (West Surrey) would lead the attack with tanks of the 32nd Army Tank Brigade in close support.

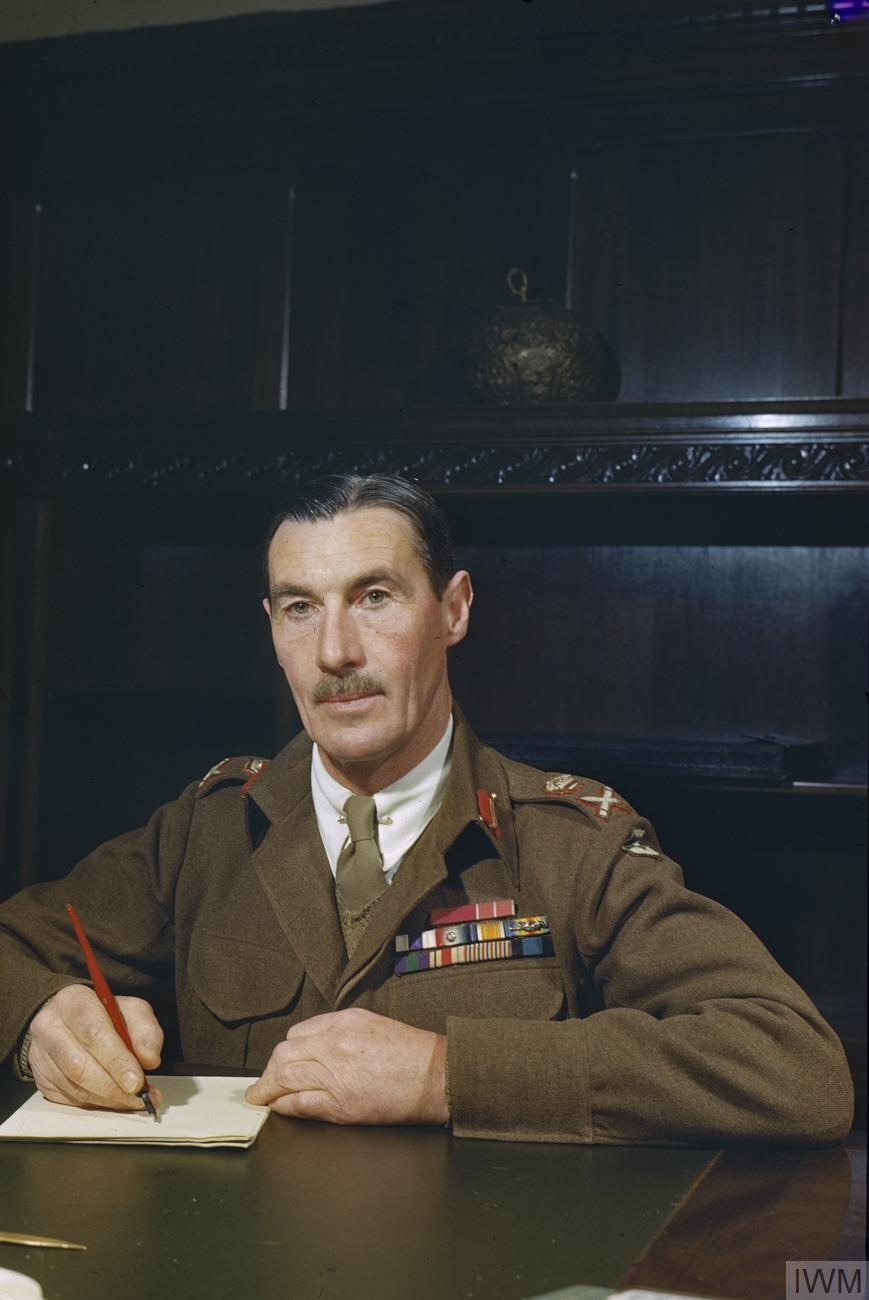
Ronald Scobie, General Officer commanding the 70th Infantry Division and the Tobruk garrison.

Under cover of dark the men moved forward, creating gaps in the barbed wire and minefields in front of their positions and bridging Tobruk's anti-tank ditch. At 06:30, on 21 November, the division began its attack on the positions of the Bologna Division and the German 90th Light Division (although the latter had not been expected). The Axis positions were well dug-in, behind mines and barbed wire, supported by machine guns and artillery. The first position, codenamed "Butch", was captured by 09:00, shortly followed by "Jill", but two attempts to capture "Tugun" were repulsed by the Italian defenders. The mix of Italian and German troops holding "Tiger" offered up the most resistance of the day. The supporting Matilda tanks ran into undetected minefields and were engaged periodically by Axis anti-tank guns. The Black Watch, under flanking fire from other Axis strong points and being fired upon directly by the defenders of "Tiger", led a bayonet charge to the sound of bagpipes and captured the position, in conjunction with elements of the 1st Royal Tank Regiment (1 RTR) and the 4th Royal Tank Regiment (4 RTR). The Black Watch suffered 75 per cent casualties, being reduced to 165 men.

Despite the losses, the Black Watch launched another attack to capture "Jack". Major Meythaler, the commanding officer of the German sector under attack, was positioned there and reported nine more British tanks lost to mines. Minutes after his report, at 10:30, the Black Watch overran the strong point. 1 RTR proceeded to overwhelm "Wolf", but were repulsed by anti-tank fire when they attempted to attack "Freddie". During the afternoon, a further attack was launched that captured half of "Tugun", but further progress was impeded by Italian artillery fire. The planned final thrust, to seize Ed Duda, was called off, due to the changing situation to the south. By the end of the day, a salient 4,000 yards (3,700 m) deep and wide had been created, 550 German and 527 Italian soldiers had been captured, and 59 tanks of the 32nd Army Tank Brigade had been lost, of which half were repaired. The war diary of the German 90th Light Division described the day's actions as "very serious" concluding "that the next day 'would probably bring a crisis'".

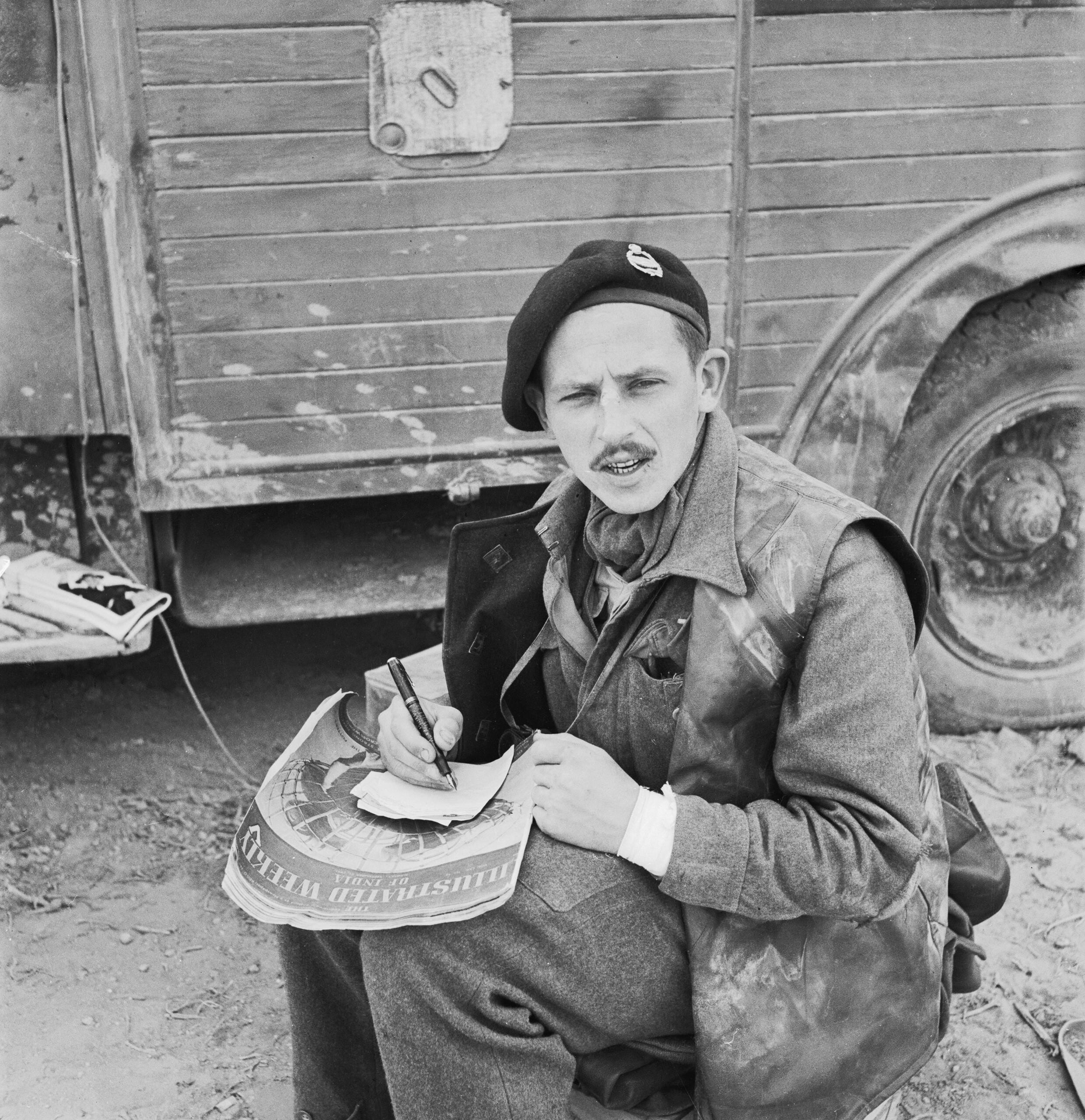
Captain Philip John Gardner was awarded the Victoria Cross for his actions during the fighting.

The following day the division improved its position. Strong point "Lion", to the south west of "Tiger", was captured, but an attempt to capture the remaining sections of "Tugun" was repelled. As a result of the fighting, the division began to face a shortage of ammunition for its artillery. (Note: Artillery support was provided by units already based in Tobruk: 1st Regiment Royal Horse Artillery, 104th Regiment Royal Horse Artillery, 107th Regiment Royal Horse Artillery and the 51st Field Regiment, Royal Artillery.) Due to the tank battle raging to the south, Scobie was ordered not to make a further advance. The author of the Official History of New Zealand in the Second World War 1939–45, W. E. Murphy, said the fighting by the British armour and 70th Division created much "confusion in the enemy camp" and that, had the 32nd Army Tank Brigade attempted, it "could certainly have got to Ed Duda" and in doing so would have thwarted the German plans, greatly aiding the beleaguered 7th Armoured Division. (Note: The following day, while under intense fire and suffering several wounds, Philip John Gardner (4 RTR) earned the Victoria Cross for attempting to save the life of a wounded soldier.)

To the south, having temporarily defeated the British armour, Rommel launched the Afrika Korps and the Italian mobile divisions towards Egypt in the "Dash to the Wire". He sought to relieve the besieged Italian garrisons along the border, cut the British supply lines and inflict an overwhelming defeat upon the Eighth Army. Despite causing panic amongst rear echelon troops, the attack was weak and ran into difficulties against prepared positions. The 2nd New Zealand Division had advanced around the Italian border defences and on 24 November began an advance towards Tobruk. By the next day, the division had reached Zaafran and retaken the much-contested Sidi Rezegh airfield.

From these positions, the New Zealanders were ordered to capture Belhamed, Sidi Rezegh proper and Ed Duda. This was to precede a renewed break-out offensive by the 70th Division. Scobie had informed Lieutenant-General Alfred Godwin-Austen, the XIII Corps commander, responsible for all operations near Tobruk, that the positions between him and Ed Duda were strongly defended. Godwin-Austen assured Scobie that he was under no obligation to attack until the New Zealand Division had taken Ed Duda. Undertaking a night assault, the New Zealand infantry captured Belhamed despite strong resistance, but their attacks to take their other objectives were repulsed.

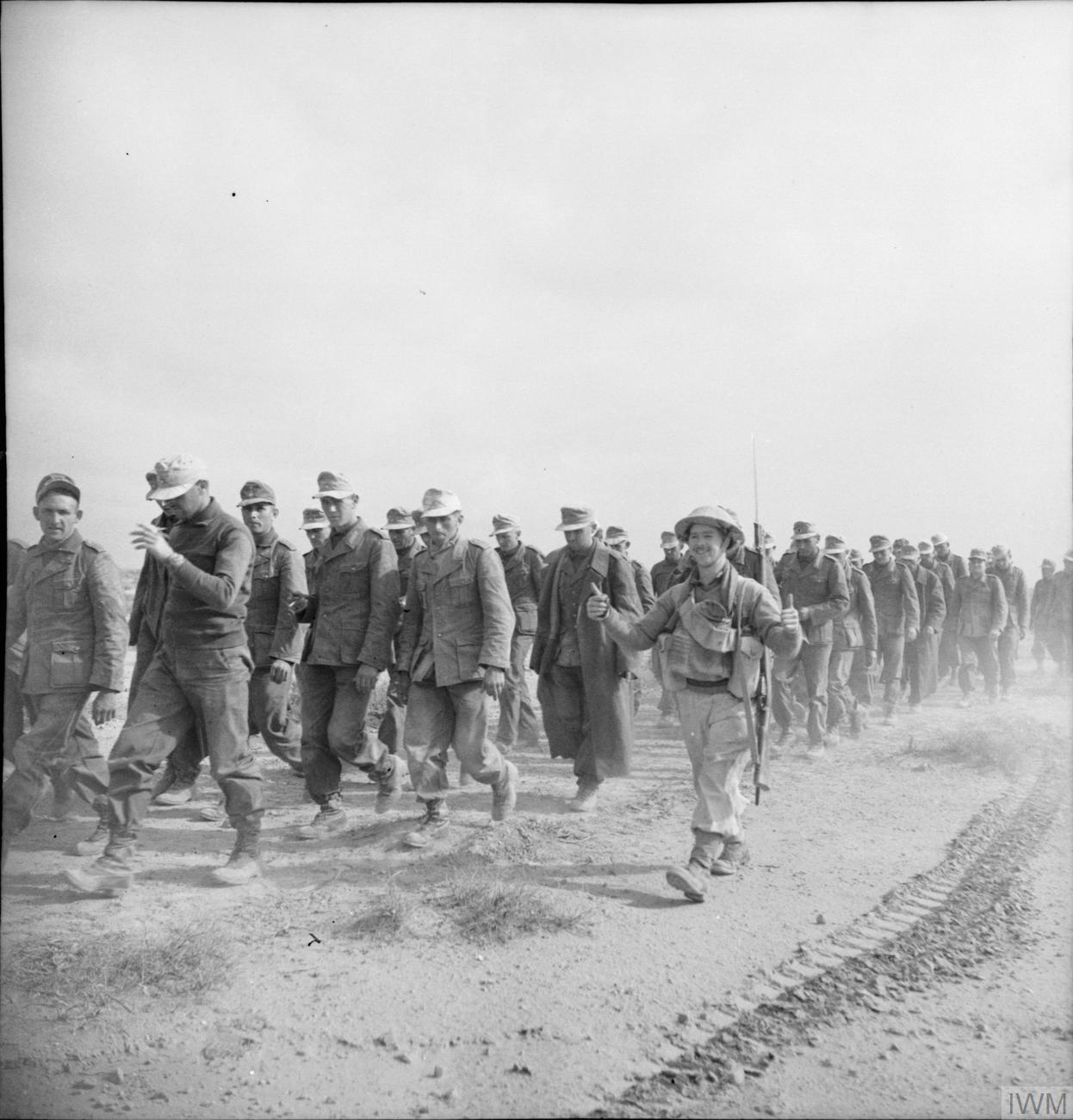
A member of the 70th Division escorting German prisoners.

Aware that Ed Duda was still in Axis hands and that the New Zealand Division had bogged down attempting to advance upon the feature and was caught up in heavy fighting, Scobie ordered his men to capture Ed Duda. The 1st Essex Regiment, with machine gun support from the Royal Northumberland Fusiliers and the 32nd Army Tank Brigade, began their attack just after midday on 26 November. Axis artillery fire damaged two tanks before they crossed the start line but the remaining 4.5 miles (7.2 km) was covered without incident. The 4 RTR were able to silence several Axis gun positions, and were joined by Z Company of the Royal Northumberland Fusiliers, who helped eliminate a further position. (Note: During the action, Captain James Jackman, Royal Northumberland Fusiliers, was killed and posthumously awarded the Victoria Cross for efforts that "did so much to end resistance" in front of the 4 RTR.) Following the fighting, the Essex were ordered to join the tanks.

The 1st Essex now advanced on Ed Duda, which was not a fortified position as previously faced by the division. An artillery bombardment and the approaching British troops persuaded the defending Italian platoon to surrender. By 15:00, Ed Duda was in British hands and the Essex began digging in to consolidate their position. Following the capture of the position, several Axis counterattacks were launched. Three German tanks inflicted heavy casualties upon a British detachment in front of the main Essex position, before being driven off. Two infantry companies advanced towards the Essex and "were badly shot up in their lorries at a range of some 200 yards." In following engagements, the Essex took upwards of 110 prisoners. By the end of the day, the position was secure for the loss of only 65 casualties. That evening, the New Zealanders renewed their attacks and succeeded in linking with the 70th Division and cutting the Axis lines of communication.

On 27 November, Rommel abandoned his attack and ordered the Afrika Korps and accompanying Italians to return to the Tobruk area. It was not until 29 November that the Axis armour launched its attack upon the 70th and New Zealand divisions. Around 50 tanks of the 15th Panzer Division advanced on the 1st Essex and were engaged by anti-tank guns and a handful of British infantry tanks. Several British tanks were hit and the rest retired. The anti-tank guns of the Essex were silenced, and 300 German soldiers from II Battalion, Infantry Regiment 115 advanced. Two companies of the Essex were overrun, with 150 men captured. As darkness fell, British and German tanks again clashed before the former withdrew. Under the cover of night, the Australian 2/13th Battalion was ordered to counter-attack along with the remnants of 4 RTR (eleven tanks in total). Elements of the Essex battalion spontaneously joined the assault, retaking the lost ground and capturing 167 prisoners for the loss of around 25 men. Less than 60 German troops were able to retreat to friendly units.

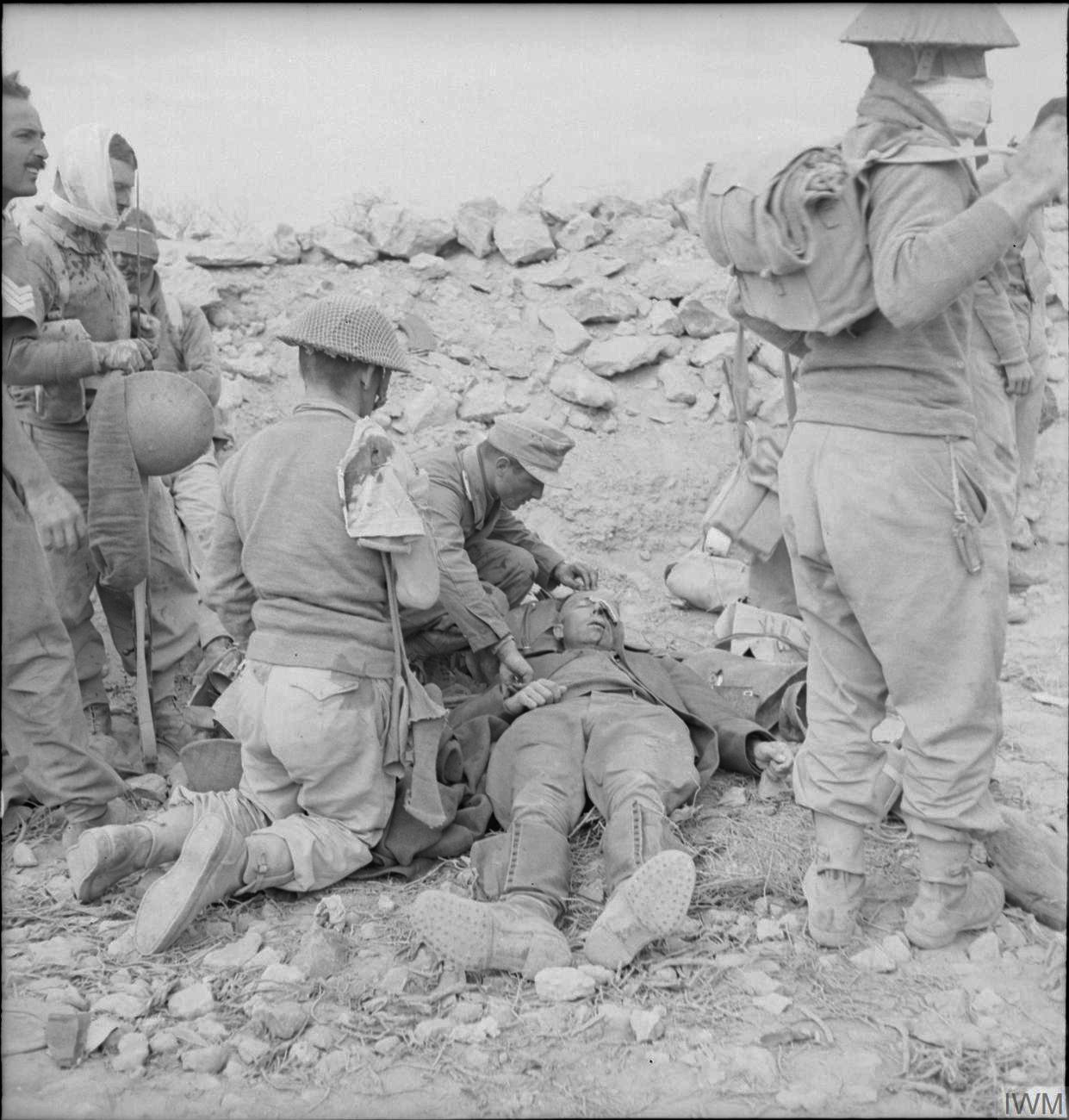
A German doctor assists British troops attending a wounded German prisoner near Tobruk, 28 November 1941.

Axis attention now concentrated upon the New Zealand Division; after the recent fighting, the division, less 4,500 men who joined the 70th Division, withdrew towards the frontier in need of rest, refitting and re-organization; the 70th Division was again cut off. On 1 December, Godwin-Austen was concerned about the exposed British position at Ed Duda, as were the staff of 70th Division, who believed the area had become untenable. Infantry had reinforced the captured ground, the 14th Infantry Brigade holding a line from Ed Duda to roughly 3 miles (4.8 km) to the north-east. The Essex were still dug in at Ed Duda, with the 19th New Zealand Battalion to their north-east, then the 4th Border Regiment, the 18th New Zealand Battalion to their east and the 1st Bedfordshire and Hertfordshire Regiment to their north at Bir (Magen) Belhamed and the captured Axis strong point known as "Leopard". The commanding officer of the 1st Essex reported that the position was well prepared and he was confident of repelling any assault. Scobie sent word stating "Well done, I admire your spirit".

For several days, the 70th Division was bombarded, and on 1 December an uncoordinated attack by the German 90th Division was repulsed by the 18th New Zealand Battalion. The following day, a larger attack was launched upon the 1st Bedfordshire and Hertfordshire Regiment. This attack was also repulsed inflicting heavy losses on one of the German battalions. On 4 December, elements of the 21st Panzer Division, supported by an ad hoc formation of 500 German infantry and Italian engineers and artillery support from the 90th Light Division, launched an assault on Ed Duda. This attack was met by the Essex, 4th Borders, 18th New Zealanders and elements of the 32nd Army Tank Brigade. The German attack was defeated and the 4th Borders, supported by tanks, counter-attacked taking 1,000 yards (910 m) of ground, for the loss of fifteen tanks.

The 70th Division had been planning another attack to capture El Adem but the battle made these plans redundant. The inability of the Germans and Italians to defeat the 70th Division and push the unit back inside Tobruk had strategic consequences. Rommel had come to the conclusion that his troops could not maintain the siege due to being overstretched, and decided to withdraw all of the troops he could to the east of Tobruk. The 70th Division initially joined other Eighth Army formations in advancing west in pursuit, but by 12 December it had returned to Tobruk. Over the course of December, Operation Crusader continued and the Axis forces retreated to El Agheila before fighting ceased. The 70th Division was withdrawn to Egypt for rest and refitting. Due to a lack of transport, the move took until mid-January. By the end of the month, the division had returned to Syria to camp near Damascus.

=== India and disbandment ===
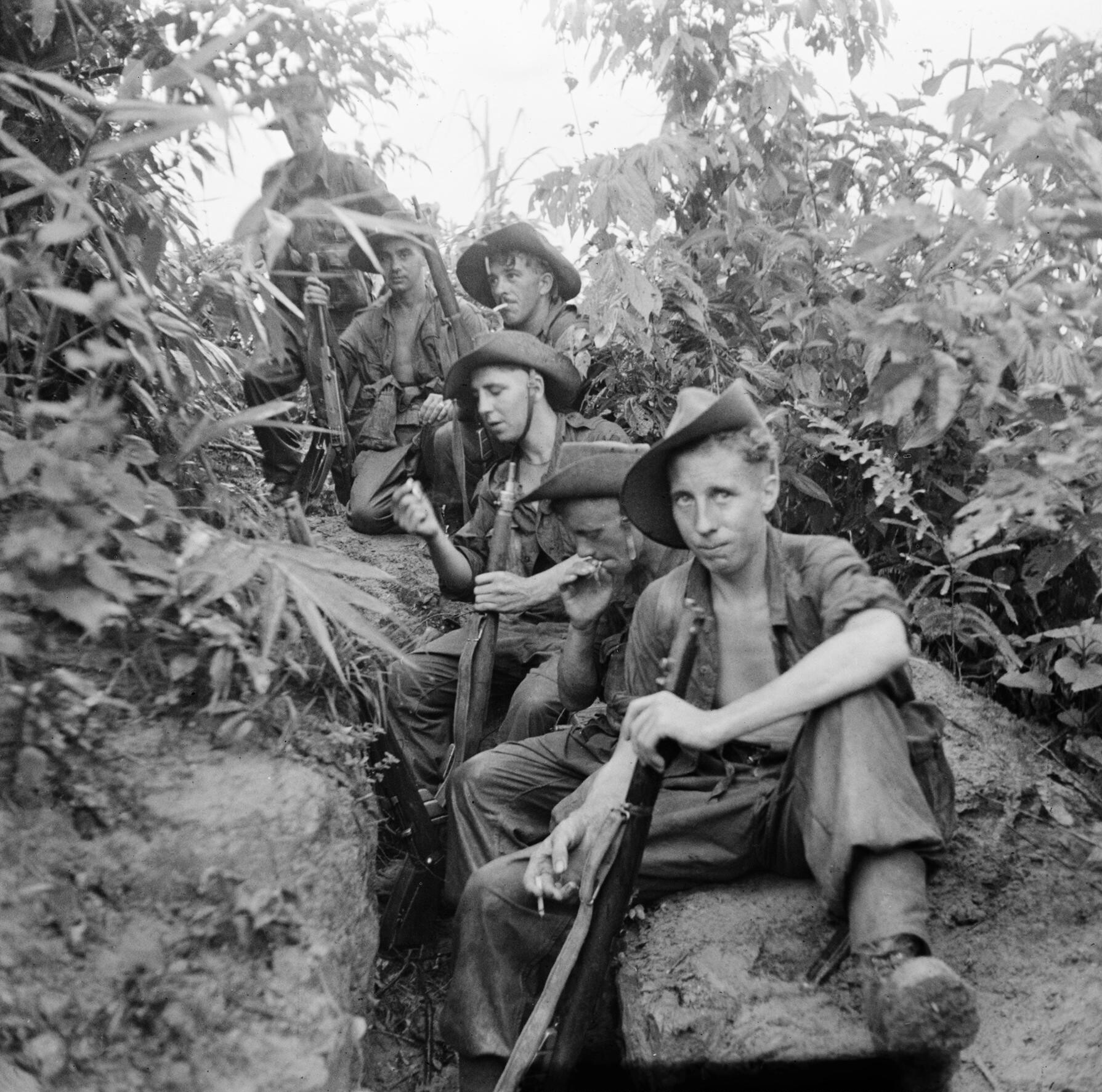
Men of the 2nd Battalion, York and Lancaster Regiment, previously part of the 70th Infantry Division, rest while on a patrol in Burma.

During the night of 7/8 December 1941, one hour prior to the Attack on Pearl Harbor, the Empire of Japan entered the war with the Japanese invasion of Malaya. Four hours following the strike on Pearl Harbor, the Battle of Hong Kong was launched; the city surrendered on Christmas Day. On 15 January 1942, the Japanese attack was expanded as their troops invaded Burma. Then, on 15 February, Singapore fell. During February, the 70th Division began moving back to Egypt. On 17 February the order was given for the division to be transferred to India. The next day, Major-General George Symes was given command of the division. They boarded ships at Suez, and had completely departed Egypt by 28 February. The division, without the 16th Brigade, reached Bombay on 10 March. With a Japanese invasion of British Ceylon expected, the 16th Brigade was sent in as reinforcements, arriving on 15 March. It remained until 1943, when it rejoined the division. In June 1942, the 70th Division was located near Ranchi; along with the 50th Indian Armoured Brigade, it formed part of the Eastern Army reserve. The division was seen as a well-trained formation and along with the 23rd Indian Infantry Division formed a mobile reserve against a Japanese landing or advance through Arakan in Burma. At Ranchi, the division also engaged in jungle warfare training.

In August 1942, Mahatma Gandhi's Quit India Movement resulted in civil disobedience spreading across Bihar, Orissa and Bengal. The division was deployed throughout these areas, suppressing the disturbances and protecting the railways of Bihar. After civil power was restored in the affected areas, the 70th Division was concentrated again at Ranchi and resumed training as part of XV Indian Corps. The corps commander, Lieutenant-General William Slim, wrote in his memoirs that the 70th Division "was one of the best British formations I have met, with a magnificent battle hardened spirit gained in the Middle East".

A member of the division, writing in May 1943, commented that it would not be

... enough for us to rest on our Middle East laurels [despite them being] "well deserved"... those days should only be regarded as a starting point in efficiency for only 100% trained tps ... will defeat the Japanese in Arakan or in any other theatre of operations.

— 70th Division soldier

In April 1943, Slim requested that the 70th Division be released from Eastern Army reserve to relieve other units on the Arakan front, but elements of the division were only slowly redeployed. The 23rd Infantry Brigade arrived in the Arakan area in May. As of June, the remainder of the division was still part of the army reserve.

On 14 February 1943, Brigadier Orde Wingate launched Operation Longcloth. This operation saw the 77th Indian Infantry Brigade operate behind the Japanese lines, supplied via air drops, ambushing Japanese troops and destroying rail lines. The force returned to Allied lines during April, having lost nearly a third of its troops; most of the remainder, as described by historian Christopher Chant, were "crippled by exhaustion, malnutrition, dysentery, and malaria." Despite this, the operation was deemed a success. In August 1943, Wingate (now a major-general) was sent to attend the Quebec Conference. Churchill and the Americans were so impressed by Wingate that Special Force, commonly known as the Chindits, were ordered to be expanded. Under this expansion, the 70th Division would be broken up and its units transferred to Special Force.

Auchinleck, now Commander-in-Chief, India, strongly opposed such a move preferring to retain the division as an entity. Instead, he proposed that the newly arrived 81st (West Africa) Division could be used in its place. Despite his arguments and the end of the division's availability for operations against the Japanese-occupied Ramree Island, he was over-ruled by Churchill's backing of Wingate. On 6 September, the division began reorganising for long-range penetration. It had been estimated that 10 percent of the men would be unsuitable but this had been based on an erroneous report given in London (believed to be from Wingate) that the division was not first class, even though the standard of its infantry was high.

On 25 October, the division was broken up and all troops were transferred to Special Force. Symes, despite his seniority, became Wingate's second-in-command and tried to prevent the further break-up of the divisional units to retain the traditions, histories and esprit de corps of the British Army's regimental structure, which reconciled his men and helped to ensure a smooth transition to Special Force. Having ceased to exist, the 70th Division was officially disbanded on 24 November.

The British Official Historian, Stanley Kirby, wrote that the best-trained and most-experienced British division had been broken up to reinforce Special Force, which eventually absorbed one-sixth of the infantry in South East Asia Command. He judged that had the division been retained, it could have reinforced the Fourteenth Army, making the defence of Imphal and Kohima in 1944 easier. Historian F. W. Perry wrote, "it is difficult to avoid the conclusion that the results achieved by the force did not represent an adequate return for the resources invested". He further argued that the force was too lightly armed to capture strongly held positions or to hold one if captured, and concluded that Special Force "inflicted more damage and disruption on the British Army than it ever did on the Japanese." Similarly, Slim argued in his memoirs that it had been a mistake to break up the 70th Division as it was the only British division which had been trained in jungle warfare, and that it would have been twice as effective as an experienced conventional formation than it proved to be as part of Special Force.

== General officers commanding ==
Appointed	General officer commanding
10 October 1941	Major-General Ronald Scobie
10 February 1942	Brigadier Cyril Lomax (acting)
18 February 1942	Major-General George Symes

== Order of battle ==
70th Infantry Division (1941–43)

14th Infantry Brigade

Main article: 14th Infantry Brigade
- 1st Battalion, Bedfordshire and Hertfordshire Regiment
- 2nd Battalion, Black Watch (Royal Highland Regiment)
- 2nd Battalion, York and Lancaster Regiment

16th Infantry Brigade

Main article: 16th Infantry Brigade
- 2nd Battalion, King's Own Royal Regiment (Lancaster)
- 2nd Battalion, Queen's Royal Regiment (West Surrey)
- 2nd Battalion, Leicestershire Regiment

23rd Infantry Brigade

Main article: 23rd Infantry Brigade
- 4th Battalion, Border Regiment
- 1st Battalion, Essex Regiment
- 1st Battalion, Durham Light Infantry (until 22 January 1942)
- 1st Battalion, Sherwood Foresters (February 1942)
- 1st Battalion, South Staffordshire Regiment (from 4 February 1942)

32nd Army Tank Brigade (attached during the Siege of Tobruk)

Main article: 32nd Army Tank Brigade
- 1st Battalion, Royal Tank Regiment
- 4th Battalion, Royal Tank Regiment
- 7th Battalion, Royal Tank Regiment

Divisional Troops

- 8th Field Regiment, Royal Artillery (from 28 February 1942)
- 51st (Westmorland and Cumberland) Field Regiment, Royal Artillery (March 1942, then from February 1943 until the division was disbanded)
- 60th (North Midland) Field Regiment, Royal Artillery (from 31 December 1941 until the division was disbanded)
- 56th Anti-Tank Regiment, Royal Artillery (1 April 1942 – 14 July 1943)
- 69th Light Anti-Aircraft/Anti-Tank Regiment, Royal Artillery (6 August 1942 – 30 September 1943)
- 70th Divisional Engineers, Royal Engineers
  - 2nd Field Company(until 21 February 1942, then from 27 June 1942 until the division disbanded)
  - 12th Field Company
  - 54th Field Company
  - 219th Field Park Company
- 70th Divisional Signals, Royal Corps of Signals
- 45th Battalion, Reconnaissance Corps (21 October 1942 – 16 September 1943)
- 1st Battalion, Royal Northumberland Fusiliers (Machine-gun battalion, attached during the Siege of Tobruk)

== Notes ==
Footnotes

Citations
