= Ronald Scobie =

British Army Lt-General and Scotland international rugby union player

Lieutenant-General Sir Ronald Scobie KBE CB MC
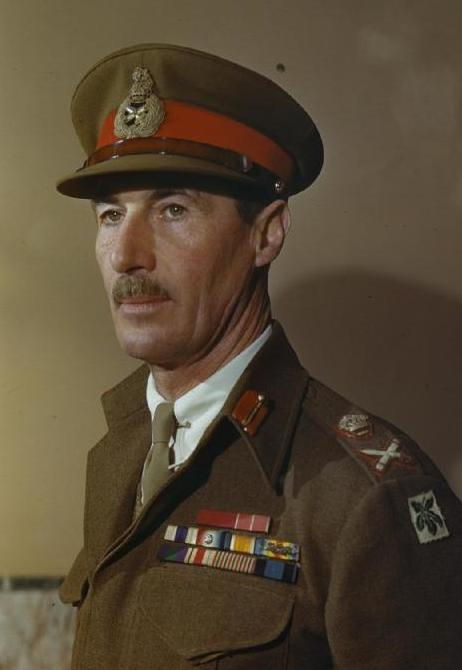
- Born: 8 June 1893; Mandalay, British Burma
- Died: 23 February 1969 (aged 75); Aldershot, Hampshire, England
- Military career
- Allegiance: United Kingdom
- Branch: British Army
- Service years: 1914–1947
- Rank: Lieutenant-General
- Unit: Royal Engineers
- Commands: III Corps; 70th Infantry Division
- Conflicts: First World War; Second World War; Greek Civil War
- Awards: Knight Commander of the Order of the British Empire; Companion of the Order of the Bath; Military Cross; Mentioned in Despatches (4); War Cross (Czechoslovakia); Silver Cross of the Virtuti Militari (Poland)

Rugby union career
- Position: Centre
Amateur team(s)
Years	Team	Apps	(Points)
- Royal Military College
–	Army Rugby Union		
Provincial / State sides
Years	Team	Apps	(Points)
1914	Blues Trial		
International career
Years	Team	Apps	(Points)
1914	Scotland	3	(0)

Lieutenant-General Sir Ronald MacKenzie Scobie, KBE, CB, MC (8 June 1893 – 23 February 1969) was a senior British Army officer who fought in both the First and Second World Wars, where he commanded the 70th Infantry Division and later III Corps. He was also a Scotland international rugby union player.

== Military career ==
Scobie was educated at Cheltenham College and the Royal Military Academy, Woolwich.

=== First World War ===
He was commissioned into the Royal Engineers in 1914 and served during the First World War on the Western Front in France and Belgium, joining 1st Field Squadron RE in November. He was a general staff officer Grade 3 in France in 1918, and a brigade major in France from 1918 to 1920.

=== Between the wars ===
After the war, Scobie became Officer, Company of Gentlemen Cadets, Royal Military Academy, Woolwich 1920–1924; Staff Captain, Aldershot Command 1927–1929; Brigade Major, Aldershot Command 1929–1931 After attending the Staff College, Camberley from 1925 to 1926, he became Director of Military Artillery at the Royal Military College, Duntroon in 1932 and, after attending the Imperial Defence College, was Assistant Adjutant General at the War Office in 1938.

=== Second World War ===
In 1939, at the outbreak of the Second World War Scobie, a brigadier, was deputy director of Mobilisation at the War Office. After this he held the position deputy adjutant general at General Headquarters, Middle East Land Forces in 1940 before being given command of the 70th Infantry Division, which was sent in to relieve the Australian 9th Division in Tobruk. Scobie was in command of the Tobruk fortress from 22 October 1941 to 13 December 1941, when, as part of Operation Crusader, the 70th Infantry Division led the break-out from Tobruk. In 1942 he became general officer commanding the Troops in Malta and on 22 March 1943 Scobie was promoted to lieutenant general and made chief of the general staff at General Headquarters Middle East.

From 11 December 1943, Scobie was given command of III Corps, which was sent to Greece to expel the Germans but ended up becoming involved in the Greek Civil War. On 1 December 1944, Scobie unilaterally issued an order for ELAS, the armed wing of the EAM, to disarm. EAM, resisting the "Scobie Order", staged a demonstration in Athens two days later which involved 200,000 people. During the demonstration, Greek police and gendarmerie opened fire on demonstrators, killing at least 28. This marked the beginning of the Dekemvriana (Greek: Δεκεμβριανά, "December events"), a 37-day period of fighting in Greece between ELAS and British and Greek government forces. He remained in command of British forces in Greece until 1946, retiring from the army in 1947.

== Rugby Union career ==
=== Amateur career ===
He played rugby union for the Royal Military College.

He played for the Army Rugby Union against the Royal Navy Rugby Union in the 1914 Inter-Services match.

=== Provincial career ===
He played for the Blues Trial side against the Whites Trial side on 10 January 1914.

=== International career ===
He was capped three times by Scotland, all in 1914.

== Other sports ==
He played cricket for Cheltenham College and for the Royal Engineers.

== Bibliography ==
- Maule, Henry (1975). Scobie, Hero of Greece: The British Campaign, 1944-5. Barker, 1975. ISBN 9780213165543.
- Mead, Richard (2007). Churchill's Lions: a biographical guide to the key British generals of World War II. Stroud (UK): Spellmount. ISBN 978-1-86227-431-0.
- Smart, Nick (2005). Biographical Dictionary of British Generals of the Second World War. Barnsley: Pen & Sword. ISBN 1844150496.

Military offices
Preceded by John Fullerton Evetts	GOC 70th Infantry Division; 1941–1942	Succeeded by George Symes
Preceded by Daniel Beak	GOC Malta Command; 1942–1943	Succeeded by Walter Oxley
Preceded by Desmond Anderson	GOC III Corps; 1943–1944	Post disbanded
