= Andrew Maitland-Makgill-Crichton =

British shipping industrialist

Sir Andrew Crichton FRSA, FCIT
- Born: Andrew Maitland-Makgill-Crichton; 28 December 1910; United Kingdom
- Died: 29 October 1995 (aged 84)
- Occupation: Industrialist
- Known for: Chairman of Overseas Containers Limited and former Vice-chairman of the Port of London Authority

Sir Andrew James Maitland-Makgill-Crichton FRSA, FCIT (28 December 1910 – 29 October 1995), known professionally as Andrew Crichton, was a British shipping industrialist. He was Chairman of Overseas Containers Limited, Vice-chairman of the Port of London Authority between 1967 and 1976, and a director of P&O for nearly a quarter of a century.

== Early life and family ==
Andrew Maitland-Makgill-Crichton was born on 28 December 1910, the eldest son of Lieutenant Colonel David Edward Maitland-Makgill-Crichton (1879–1952) and his wife, Phyllis (died 1982), daughter of Claude Arthur Cuthbert, of Bryn Garth in Herefordshire.

His brother David drowned in 1941, while serving in World War II; another brother, Edward, was an army officer and rose to the rank of major-general; of his two sisters, Katherine Grizel married a doctor and moved to the United States, and Jean Beatrice married the second Baron Morris. A paternal uncle, Henry, was a brigadier in the army. In 1948, Andrew Crichton married Isabel (died 1997), a daughter of Andrew Joseph McGill and a widow of John Eric Bain; the marriage produced no children.

Crichton's father had spent much of his career with the Queen's Own Cameron Highlanders in India. He sent Andrew to Wellington College with a view to him entering the military.

== Career ==
However, after Crichton left school, he entered the world of business, joining Gray, Dawes and Co. in 1929. He moved over to Mackinnon Mackenzie in 1931 and worked for them in India, where they were agents for P&O.

In the years before World War II, he worked at their offices in Colombo, Ceylon, and latterly in Bombay. During the war, he was seconded to the Government Headquarters in Delhi as the deputy director of Movements with responsibility for shipping with the rank of lieutenant colonel.

When the war ended, he returned to Mackinnon Mackenzie, but after three years moved over to P&O; in 1951, he became general manager at the company. While he remained there till 1965, he took up extra posts in the meantime, becoming chairman of the National Association of Port Employers (NAPE; 1958–65) and vice-chairman of the British Transport Docks Board (1963–68). In the former role, he backed dockers' calls for pay rises which frustrated Conservative ministers who were pressing for public sector pay cuts.

His work as chairman of Overseas Containers Limited from 1965 has been described as the "pinnacle" of his career; OCL was a consortium set up by P&O, the British and Commonwealth Shipping Co., the Ocean Steam Ship Co. (Blue Funnel), and Furness, Withy & Co. It was there that he was tasked with overseeing large savings in cost and time before he retired in 1973.

Crichton held a number of other directorships and corporate posts at various points in his career: at Standard Chartered Group, Inchcape Insurance Holdings, the London Tin Corporation and Butler's Warehousing and Distribution. He was also vice-chairman of the Port of London Authority between 1967 and 1976, a member of the Baltic Exchange and an arbitrator for the Police Council of Great Britain. He died on 29 October 1995.

== Recognition ==
He was knighted in the 1963 Birthday Honours for his work with the NAPE and the National Joint Council for the Port Transport Industry, where he was chairman of the employers' side of the organisation.

== Personal life ==
A likeness was created of Sir Andrew Maitland-Makgill-Crichton by Godfrey Argent, bromide print, 19 February 1970 (10 7/8 inch x 8 inch/275 mm x 202 mm). Held in the National Portrait Gallery.
