= James Jackman =

James Joseph Bernard Jackman
- Born: 19 March 1916; Glenageary, Ireland
- Died: 26 November 1941 (aged 25); El Duda, Tobruk, Libya
- Burial place: Tobruk War Cemetery
- Military career
- Allegiance: United Kingdom
- Branch: British Army
- Rank: Captain
- Service number: 69102
- Units: Royal Northumberland Fusiliers
- Conflicts: Second World War: North African campaign; Western Desert campaign; Operation Crusader †
- Awards: Victoria Cross

Captain James Joseph Bernard Jackman VC (19 March 1916 – 26 November 1941) was an Irish posthumous recipient of the Victoria Cross, the highest and most prestigious award for gallantry in the face of an enemy that can be awarded to British and Commonwealth forces.

== Details ==
Jackman was 25 years old, and a captain commanding Z Company of the 1st Battalion, Royal Northumberland Fusiliers, part of the 70th Division, during the Second World War when the following deed took place during Operation Crusader for which he was awarded the VC. His citation in the London Gazette reads:

On 25th November, 1941, at Ed Duda, South East of Tobruk, Captain Jackman showed outstanding gallantry and devotion to duty above all praise when he was in command of a Machine Gun Company of The Royal Northumberland Fusiliers in the Tank attack on the Ed Duda ridge. His magnificent bearing was contributory in a large measure to the success of a most difficult and hard fought action. As the tanks reached the crest of the rise they were met by extremely intense fire from a large number of guns of all descriptions: the fire was so heavy that it was doubtful for a moment whether the Brigade could maintain its hold on the position.

The tanks having slowed to "hull-down" positions, settled to beat down the enemy fire, during which time Captain Jackman rapidly pushed up the ridge leading his Machine Gun trucks and saw at once that Anti-Tank Guns were firing at the flank of the tanks, as well as the rows of batteries which the tanks were engaging on their front.

He immediately started to get his guns into action as calmly as though he were on manoeuvres and so secured the right flank. Then, standing up in the front of his truck, with calm determination he led his trucks across the front between the tanks and the uns—there was no other road to get them into action on the left flank.

Most of the tank commanders saw him, and his exemplary devotion to duty regardless of danger not only inspired his own men but clinched the determination of the tank crews never to relinquish the position which they had gained.

Throughout he coolly directed the guns to their positions and indicated targets to them and at that time seemed to bear a charmed life but later he was killed while still inspiring everyone with the greatest confidence by his bearing.

== The medal ==
Jackman's Cross found its final home at his alma mater, Stonyhurst College, on permanent loan from his late sister's family.
