= 14th Infantry Brigade (United Kingdom) =

- Active: December 1899–1900; 1902–October 1919 ? –26 July 1940; 30 October 1940–1 November 1944
- Country: United Kingdom
- Branch: British Army
- Role: Infantry
- Engagements: Second Boer War; World War I World War II

The 14th Infantry Brigade was a British Army formation during the Second Boer War, World War I, when it served on the Western Front, and World War II, when it fought in Crete and Tobruk, and then as Chindits in Burma.

== Second Boer War ==
British Army brigades had traditionally been ad hoc formations known by the name of their commander or numbered as part of a division. However, Regular Army units involved in the Second Boer War in 1899 were organised into sequentially numbered brigades that were frequently reassigned between divisions. After the disastrous Battle of Magersfontein in December 1899, a 7th Division was assembled and sent out from the UK under Lieutenant-General Charles Tucker with 14th and 15th Brigades under command.

=== Order of Battle 1900 ===
14th Brigade was constituted as follows:

- General Officer Commanding:
  - Major-General Sir Herbert Chermside – promoted to command 3rd Division March 1900
  - Brigadier-General John Maxwell
- 2nd Battalion, Norfolk Regiment – from Fermoy, Ireland
- 2nd Battalion, Lincolnshire Regiment – from Aldershot
- 1st Battalion, King's Own Scottish Borderers – from Dublin, Ireland
- 2nd Battalion, Hampshire Regiment – from Cork, Ireland
- Bearer Company and Field Hospital, Royal Army Medical Corps

The battalions embarked on about 4 January 1900, the Norfolks and Hampshires aboard the SS Assaye, the Lincolns on the SS Goorkha, and the KOSBs on the Goorkha and the Braemar Castle. They arrived at Cape Town about 23–26 January and began to move up-country. By 10 February 1900 14th Bde was at Enslin, while the rest of 7th Division was at Graspan

=== Modder River to Bloemfontein ===
7th Division then took part in Lord Roberts' advance from. the Modder River towards the Orange Free State (OFS) capital at Bloemfontein, reaching Jacobsdal on 15 February. When the OFS army under General Piet Cronjé was cornered at the Battle of Paardeberg on 18 January, Chermside was ordered to march there from Jacobsdal. 14th Brigade arrived on the evening of 19 January to join the siege of Cronjé's force, doing good work in repelling the Boer reinforcements trying to cut their way through to relieve him. The 1st KOSB had several sharp engagements against them, particularly on 23 February, when the Boer relieving force failed to recapture 'Kitchener's Kopje'.

After Cronjé's surrender at Paardeberg the remaining Boer forces in the region dug in on both sides of the Poplar Grove drift across the Modder, blocking the way to the OFS capital of Bloemfontein. Roberts planned to surround the Boers south of the river with a wide outflanking manoeuvre on 7 March, and sent Chermside's 14th Brigade to harass and pin them in position. It was accompanied by 7th Division's artillery (3rd Brigade-Division, Royal Field Artillery – 18th, 62nd and 75th Batteries) and the divisional mounted troops (Nesbitt's Horse, reinforced by the New South Wales and Queensland Mounted Infantry), with orders to start when 6th Division had cleared the Kopjes to the front. However, the Boers started to withdraw as soon as 6th Division began its advance and the Battle of Poplar Grove was inconclusive. On 9 March Roberts issued his orders for the advance from Poplar Grove to Bloemfontein. This was in three parallel columns, with Tucker commanding the right (southern) column consisting of 7th Division and mounted troops. It was not engaged in the Battle of Driefontein, and reached Bloemfontein on 14 March, the day after Roberts' entry. The division was then posted north of the city while Roberts built up his forces for the next phase of the campaign into Transvaal.

=== Bloemfontein to Pretoria ===
Roberts sent a force up the railway to establish an advanced base at Karee Siding before advancing on Johannesburg and Pretoria. It included 7th Division (6000 strong – 3000 short of establishment) and three mounted brigade, which gathered at Glen Siding, where the railway crossed the Modder (the Boers had destroyed the bridge). 14th Brigade crossed the Modder on 28 March and next day the force marched towards Karee Siding, where the Boers were strongly positioned in the hills. 7th Division followed the railway with 14th Bde echeloned ahead of 15th Bde, while the mounted troops made wide turning movements on the flanks. The Boers abandoned the first line of hills, which Chermside occupied. He then moved on to the second line, where a few shots were fired at the Lincolns in the lead but which were occupied by 13.30. However, the Boers' main position was well-concealed on the third and final range of hills. Two companies of the KOSB advancing over open ground came under fire and were forced to take shelter in a spruit (watercourse) . Two Boer guns caused some casualties until they were silenced by two British guns brought over rough ground to Chermside's right. A gap having opened between 14th and 15th Bdes, two battalions of the 15th moved over to extend Chermside's left, giving him six battalions in the firing line. Ineffectual fire was then exchanged for about an hour while the mounted troops attempted to turn the Boer position. However, about 16.00 15th Bde was able to force the position in its front, and the Boers began to give way. 14th Brigade then attacked, with the Norfolks in the lead, and cleared the hills. The mounted troops and artillery were still too far away to do much damage to the Boers fleeing towards Brandfort, but 7th Division now held the hills, opening the way for Roberts' later advance. 14th Brigade's casualties in the action were about 100.

Roberts was unable to advance from Bloemfontein until early May when he had built up his forces and supply lines. During April Chermside was transferred to the command of 3rd Division and Colonel John Maxwell was promoted to take over 14th Bde. Before the army could move, 7th Division carried out some preliminary movements on 30 April to clear the hills north of Krantzkraal. The operation was confused by unclear orders, but Maxwell's 14th Bde was able to occupy its objective without trouble. The main advance began on 3 May, with 7th Division part of the central column. 14th Brigade was delayed by the Ermelo Commando until nearly sunset, but Roberts' wide advance forced the Boers to retreat and Brandfort was occupied that day. Roberts' infantry halted on 4 May to allow supplies to come up, but renewed their advance next day, passing through Smalldeel on 6 May. The Boers attempted to make a stand at the Zand River to defend Kroonstad, but Roberts forced a crossing on 10 May, the cavalry turning the flank and 7th Division going over at Junction Drift. 15th Brigade led the way, supported by 14th Bde, which worked to make the drifts easier for the transport column. Kroonstad was occupied on 12 May, where there was another 10-day halt to bring up supplies. Roberts then advanced rapidly with his central column, crossing the Vaal River and entering Johannesburg on 31 May.

Roberts stationed 15th Bde to garrison Johannesburg, leaving 14th Bde as 7th Division's only infantry. The advance towards Pretoria began on 3 June, and the undefended city was occupied two days later. The Central Column, including 14th Bde, had marched 299 miles from Bloemfontein since 3 May. Between 16 May and 16 June, 14th Bde had only lost 150 (5 per cent) out of its 2657 men, mostly to sickness and exhaustion. Once Pretoria was occupied 14th Bde was assigned as its garrison, with Maxwell appointed as governor. 14th Brigade remained in existence at Pretoria for some months, but after the Battle of Diamond Hill (11–12 June 1900) 'divisions and even brigades were broken up haphazardly to form columns', and permanent numbered formations disappeared.

=== Postwar ===
During 1902, 7th Division and 14th Bde began to reform at the Curragh outside Dublin, but it was not until 1 November 1905 that Colonel Alexander Thorneycroft was appointed as brigadier-general commanding 14th Bde, which then comprised:

- 4th Bn, Royal Warwickshire Regiment at the Curragh
- 4th Bn, Royal Fusiliers at Dublin
- 1st Bn, East Lancashire Regiment at Dublin
- 1st Bn, South Staffordshire Regiment at the Curragh

Under the Haldane Reforms, a British Expeditionary Force (BEF) was planned, with Regular Army units assigned in peacetime to the permanent brigades and divisions with which they would go overseas in the event of war. Divisions were now to comprise three rather than two brigades, so the division at the Curragh was renumbered 5th Division. Colonel William Douglas succeeded Thorneycroft in command of 14th Bde on 1 November 1909, by which time the composition of the brigade was:

- 1st Bn, Royal Fusiliers at Dublin
- 2nd Bn, Essex Regiment at Dublin
- 2nd Bn, Royal Sussex Regiment at the Curragh
- 1st Bn, Royal Berkshire Regiment at the Curragh

Units were regularly rotated thereafter.

=== Curragh incident ===
The Curragh incident occurred in March 1914, when officers serving in Ireland were asked whether they were prepared to march to Ulster, potentially to act against the Ulster Volunteers who were threatening to rebel against Irish Home Rule. Although most attention was paid to 3rd Cavalry Brigade at the Curragh, 14th Brigade was also involved. On 20 March the officers of the 2nd Bn, Suffolk Regiment, among others, unanimously resolved to resign their commissions rather than take action against Loyalists in Northern Ireland. Next day the commanders of 5th Division and 14th Bde addressed the officers of the Suffolks, who agreed to march north if ordered for protective duty, reserving the question of resignation if they were subsequently ordered to take action they considered unacceptable. The Government shelved the question in the face of widespread protests, and it was overtaken by the outbreak of World War I later in the year.

== World War I ==
In August 1914 14th Bde mobilised as part of 5th Division and served with it on the Western Front. On 30 December 1915 the brigade was transferred to the 32nd Division, with which it served for the rest of the war.

=== Order of battle ===
Subordinate units during the war included:

- 1st Battalion, Devonshire Regiment - (left January 1916 transferred to 95th Brigade)
- 2nd Battalion, Suffolk Regiment - (left September 1914)
- 1st Battalion, East Surrey Regiment - (left January 1916 transferred to 95th Brigade)
- 1st Battalion, Duke of Cornwall's Light Infantry - (left January 1916 transferred to 95th Brigade)
- 2nd Battalion, Manchester Regiment - (joined December 1915, left February 1918 transferred to 96th Brigade)
- 1st Battalion, Dorset Regiment (joined 7 January 1916)
- 1/5th (Earl of Chester's) Battalion, Cheshire Regiment - (joined February 1915, left November 1915)
- 1/9th (Highlanders) Battalion, Royal Scots - (joined November 1915)
- 2nd Battalion, Royal Inniskilling Fusiliers - (joined November 1915)
- 5th/6th Battalion, Royal Scots – (joined July 1916)
- 15th (Service) Battalion, Royal Warwickshire Regiment (2nd Birmingham) - (joined December 1915 transferred from 95th Brigade, left January 1916 transferred to 13th Brigade)
- 19th (Service) Battalion, Lancashire Fusiliers (3rd Salford) – (joined January 1916 transferred from 96th Brigade, left July 1916)
- 15th (Service) Battalion, Highland Light Infantry (1st Glasgow) – (joined January 1916 transferred from 97th Brigade)
- 14th Brigade Machine Gun Company – (joined February 1916, moved to 32nd Battalion Machine Gun Corps (MGC) 21 February 1918)
- 14th Trench Mortar Battery – (formed March 1916)

== World War II ==
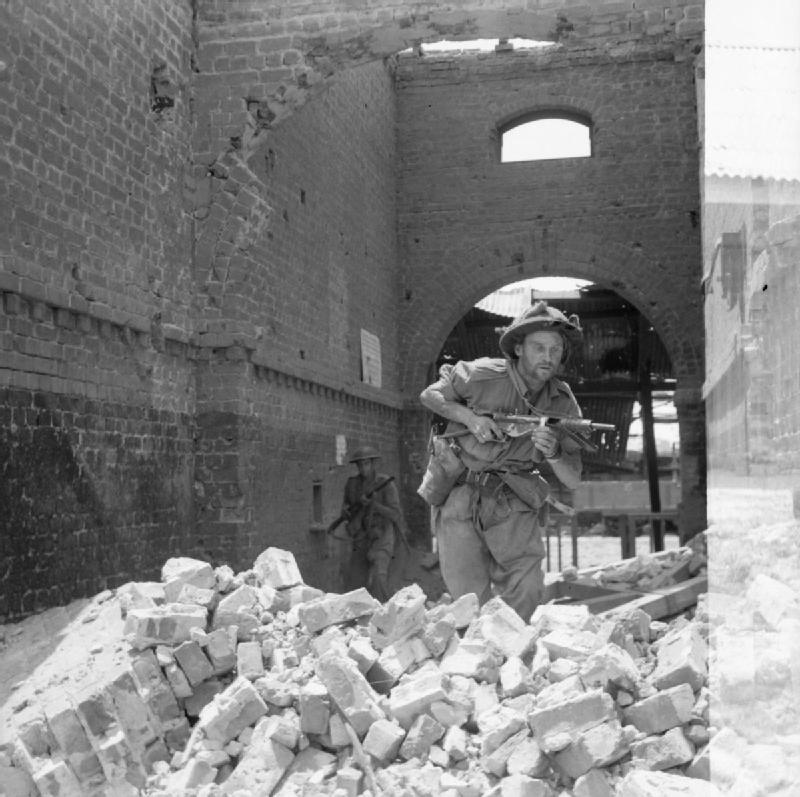
Men of the 2nd Battalion, York and Lancaster Regiment searching the ruins of a railway station for Japanese snipers, during the advance of the Fourteenth Army to Rangoon along the railway corridor, 13 April 1945.

At the start of the war this formation was made up of regular army battalions based in the Middle East garrisons, nominally part of the 8th Infantry Division. It was present at the Battle of Crete, holding Heraklion airfield and causing many casualties among the German Parachute troops. Evacuated to North Africa where it became part of the 70th Infantry Division in the break out from Tobruk. The 70th Infantry Division was transferred to India and then Burma. Here the division, including the 14th Infantry Brigade, was split up and reformed as Chindits, fighting in the Second Chindit Expedition of 1944 (codenamed Operation Thursday). The brigade suffered 489 casualties during the Chindit operation. On 1 November 1944 the brigade was redesignated as the 14th British Airlanding Brigade.

=== Order of battle ===
The following infantry battalions were assigned to the 14th Infantry Brigade for various periods during the war.

- 2nd Battalion, Queen's Royal Regiment (West Surrey)
- 1st Battalion, Argyll and Sutherland Highlanders
- 2nd Battalion, Rifle Brigade (Prince Consort's Own)
- 1st Battalion, Welch Regiment
- 1st Battalion, Bedfordshire and Hertfordshire Regiment
- 2nd Battalion, York and Lancaster Regiment
- 2nd Battalion, King's Own Royal Regiment (Lancaster)
- 1st Battalion, South Staffordshire Regiment
- 2nd Battalion, Black Watch (Royal Highland Regiment)
- 2/4th Australian Infantry Battalion
- 2nd Battalion, Leicestershire Regiment
- 7th Battalion, Leicestershire Regiment

== Commanders ==
Commanders of 14th Brigade included the following:

- Maj-Gen Sir Herbert Chermside (December 1899–March 1900)
- Brig-Gen John Maxwell (March 1900)
- Temporary Brig Gen Alexander Thorneycroft (1 November 1905)
- Maj-Gen William Douglas (1 November 1909)
- Brig-Gen Stuart Peter Rolt (30 November 1912; sick 20 October 1914)
- Lt-Col J.R. Longley (acting 20 October 1914)
- Brig-Gen Stanley Maude (23 October 1914, wounded 12 April 1915; returned 4 May 1915)
- Lt-Col E.G. Williams (acting 12 April 1915)
- Brig-Gen George Thesiger (temporary 17 April 1915)
- Brig-Gen C.W. Crompton (10 September 1915)
- Brig-Gen W.W. Seymour (24 November 1916; sick 12 April 1917)
- Brig-Gen Frederick Lumsden, VC, DSO*** (12 April 1917; killed 4 June 1918)
- Lt-Col V.B. Ramsden (acting 4 June 1918)
- Brig-Gen Lewis Pugh Evans VC, DSO* (10 June 1918)
- Maj.-Gen. J. F. C. Fuller (? – 14 December 1930)
- Maj.-Gen. H. J. Huddleston (14 December 1930 – 1 July 1933)
- Brig. H. C. Maitland-Makgill-Crichton (11 July 1933 – 29 June 1937)
- Brig. H. C. Harrison (29 June 1937 – 27 January 1939)
- Brig. A. R. Godwin-Austen (31 December 1938 – 23 August 1939)
- Brig. G. Dawes (3 September 1939 – 26 July 1940)
- Brig. O. H. Tidbury (30 October 1940 – 27 April 1941)
- Brig. B. H. Chappel (27 April 1941 – 2 May 1942)
- Brig. A. Gilroy (2 May 1942 – 6 November 1943)
- Brig. Thomas Brodie (6 November 1943 – 31 October 1944)

== See also ==
- British Divisions in World War II
- British Army Order of Battle - September 1939
- 6th Infantry Division
- Siege of Tobruk
- Chindits
