= Henry Maitland-Makgill-Crichton =

British Army officer (1880–1953)

Brigadier Henry Maitland-Makgill-Crichton CB CMG DSO
- Born: 29 June 1880; London, England
- Died: 29 September 1953 (aged 73); Alton, Hampshire, England
- Military career
- Allegiance: United Kingdom
- Branch: British Army
- Service years: 1899–1937; 1939–1941
- Rank: Brigadier
- Unit: Royal Scots Fusiliers
- Commands: 14th Infantry Brigade (1933–1937); 1st Battalion Royal Scots Fusiliers (1928–1931)
- Conflicts: Second Boer War; First World War; Second World War
- Awards: Companion of the Order of the Bath; Companion of the Order of St Michael and St George; Distinguished Service Order; Mentioned in Despatches (8)

Brigadier Henry Coventry Maitland-Makgill-Crichton, CB, CMG, DSO (29 June 1880 – 29 September 1953) was a Scottish senior officer in the British Army. A graduate of the Royal Military College, Sandhurst, Maitland served as an officer in the Royal Scots Fusiliers during the Second Boer War and the First World War. He was severely wounded in both conflicts and received multiple mentions in despatches.

In 1915, Maitland was promoted to the rank of brevet major; subsequent promotions followed and he was gazetted as a colonel in 1931. This coincided with the start of a two-year appointment as Quartermaster-General in Gibraltar. On his return, he was granted the temporary rank of brigadier, commanded an infantry regiment and became an Aide-de-Camp to the King before his retirement in 1937. Despite returning as an area commander for the first two years of the Second World War, Maitland left active service in 1941 and died at the age of 73 in 1953.

== Early life and family ==
Henry Coventry Maitland-Makgill-Crichton was born on 29 June 1880, the second son of Andrew Coventry Maitland-Makgill-Crichton (1845–1925), a director of the Standard and Chartered banking group, and his wife Katherine Charlotte (died 1941), eldest daughter of Sir Edward Hulse, 5th Baronet. The Maitland-Makgill-Crichton family descends from Charles Maitland, 6th Earl of Lauderdale.

He married in 1911 Dorothy Margaret (died 1979), daughter of Sir Walter Thorburn, a member of parliament. They had a daughter, Diana Elizabeth Katherine (1916–1999), who earned the Territorial Decoration, and a son, Hamilton Ian (born 1918), who was killed in action in June 1940 while commissioned as a lieutenant in the Royal Scots Fusiliers. His nephew was the industrialist Andrew Maitland-Makgill-Crichton.

== Military career ==
Following his Charterhouse education, Maitland attended the Royal Military College Sandhurst before he was commissioned into the Royal Scots Fusiliers as a second lieutenant on 6 December 1899. He served with the regiment in South Africa during the Second Boer War, where he was wounded. While there, he was promoted to lieutenant on 12 November 1900, and for his service he received the Queen's South Africa Medal with four clasps. Having returned to the United Kingdom before the end of war in June 1902, he was again sent to South Africa to serve there with the 2nd battalion in November 1902, but returned with most of the battalion after only a couple of months, leaving Cape Town for Southampton on the SS Staffordshire in January 1903. He then served in the United Kingdom until 1906, when he was transferred to the first battalion in India. After leaving there in 1910, he trained at the Staff College, graduated three years later and then served in the First World War.

He succeeded Major George Norton Cory as a GSO3 at the War Office in August 1914. He suffered severe injuries at the Second Battle of Ypres. He was appointed a brigade major in April 1915, and received brevet promotion to major that June and was promoted to substantive major in September. He was mentioned in despatches eight times, received the Distinguished Service Order in 1916, and was appointed a Companion of the Order of St Michael and St George in 1919.

Maitland was promoted to the rank of lieutenant colonel in 1928, and placed in command of the 1st Battalion of the Royal Scots Fusiliers. He was promoted to colonel in 1931, with seniority from 3 June 1922. Between 1931 and 1933, he was assistant adjutant and quartermaster-general in charge of administration in Gibraltar. On 11 July 1933, he was transferred to the command of the 14th Infantry Brigade and granted the temporary rank of brigadier. After four years in that post and three as an aide-de-camp to the king, he was appointed a Companion of the Order of the Bath and retired on 29 June 1937, when he was granted the honorary rank of brigadier. Maitland returned to the army during the Second World War, when he served as an area commander between 1939 and 1941. He died on 29 September 1953 at the age of 73.

Military offices
Preceded by C. H. I. Jackson^{1}	Commanding Officer 1st Battalion Royal Scots Fusiliers; 16 February 1928 – 18 April 1931	Succeeded by Arthur Stanley-Clarke^{2}
Preceded by John Buxton^{3}	Assistant Adjutant and Quartermaster General in Charge of Administration, Gibraltar; 25 April 1931 – 24 June 1933	Succeeded by Dennis King^{4}
Preceded by Hubert Huddleston^{5}	Commander, 14th Infantry Brigade; 1 July 1933 – 29 June 1937	Succeeded by Harold Harrison^{6}
Notes and references
1. London Gazette, 17 February 1928 (issue 33357), p. 1137; 2. London Gazette, 24 April 1931 (issue 33710), p. 2647; 3. London Gazette, 19 May 1931 (issue 33717), p. 3226; 4. London Gazette, 30 June 1933 (issue 33955), p. 3226; 5. London Gazette, 6 July 1937 (issue 34415), p. 4344; 6. London Gazette, 30 June 1933 (issue 33955), p. 4382
