= Harold Harrison (British Army officer) =

England international rugby union player

Brigadier Harold Harrison CB DSO
- Born: Harold Cecil Harrison; 26 February 1889; Solihull, England
- Died: 26 March 1940 (aged 51); Marylebone, London, England
- School: King Edward's School, Birmingham
- Occupation(s): Royal Marines and British Army officer

Rugby union career
- Position: Forward
Senior career
Years	Team	Apps	(Points)
- Royal Marine Artillery
–	Army		
–	Navy		
–	United Services		
–	Barbarian F.C.		
–	Kent		
International career
Years	Team	Apps	(Points)
1909–1914	England	4	(4)

Brigadier Harold Cecil Harrison, CB, DSO (26 February 1889 – 26 March 1940) was a senior British Army officer and an English rugby union player, who at club level represented several rugby teams in the British Armed Forces, most notably United Services, and was capped four times for the England national rugby union team. Harrison was part of the England team that won the Grand Slam during the 1914 Five Nations Championship.

== Personal history ==
Harrison was born in Solihull, England in 1889 to Edward James and Laura Harrison and was educated at King Edward's School, Birmingham. He was married to Katie Deeley of Box, Wiltshire. He died at home at Ivor Court in Marylebone in London in 1940 at the age of 51. He was cremated at East Finchley Cemetery.

== Rugby career ==
Harrison came to note as a rugby player when he represented the Royal Marine Artillery team based in Woolwich. An imposing forward player, he was selected for both the Army and Royal Navy teams before representing the United Services. The United Services was made up of servicemen from the Royal Navy and played against the biggest clubs from all over Great Britain. It was while Harrison was playing for United Services that he was selected to play at international level, gaining his first cap for England in the 1909 Home Nations Championship. Harrison was the only new cap brought into the England squad, to face Scotland at Richmond. England lost 8–18, and Harrison was dropped for the rest of the campaign.

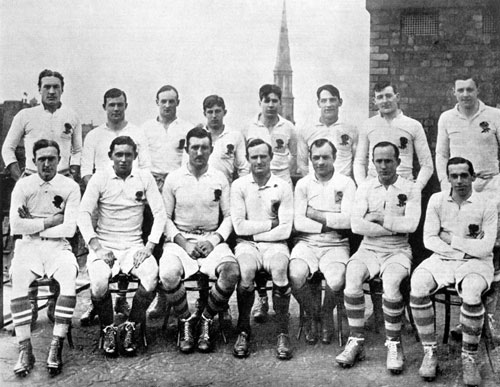
The 1914 England team vs Scotland. Harrison is sat third from left

Although out of favour at international level, Harrison was still in demand. In 1911 he was selected to play for invitational touring team the Barbarians, joining the side on their Easter tour of Wales. He was re-invited to join the Barbarians in 1914, to play a forces team from Shoreham Camp. Harrison was given the honour of captaining the Barbarians to 16–13 victory, his opposing captain being Edgar Mobbs.

1914 also saw Harrison back in favour with the England selectors, and in February he was back in the national team to face Ireland as part of the 1914 Five Nations Championship. England had won the opening game of the tournament against Wales, and Harrison retained his place when they narrowly beat Ireland at Twickenham. He then faced Scotland for the second time, this time away from home at Inverleith. Harrison was given conversion duties during the match, an unusual tactic for a forward, and successfully kicked two goals which prove decisive in a narrow 16–15 win for his England team. With three victories over the other Home Nations, England had won the Triple Crown, leaving recent inductees France as the only obstacle to stop England taking the Championship and the Grand Slam. Harrison was again selected, but kicking duties were now given to John Greenwood. England won convincingly, making Harrison a Grand Slam winning champion. He may have been selected for further England games, but the outbreak of the First World War ended all international competitions.

Harrison continued to play rugby during the war, and again captained the Barbarians in a 1915 encounter with a South African Services XI. In 1922, he took part as a referee in the international encounter between France and Scotland in the 1922 Five Nations Championship. Whilst playing in the Navy, Harrison was known by the nickname, "Dreadnought".

== Military service ==
Harrison was a career soldier and joined the British armed forces after leaving school. He served in the Royal Marines Artillery and by 1908 he had reached the rank of lieutenant. During the First World War he was initially stationed in German South-West Africa, where he served as a commander of a South African siege battery. He was first Mentioned in Despatches during the African campaign and by 1915 he had been promoted to temporary major. In 1916 he and his battery were stationed in France, and during action in Pozières he was awarded the Distinguished Service Order. His DSO citation reads:

Lt. and temp. Capt. Harold Cecil Harrison, R.M. Art. For conspicuous gallantry during operations. He carried out two dangerous reconnaissances far in front of our foremost line, and brought back valuable reports. On both occasions he was under heavy shell and rifle fire. He had previously been observing from a tree when it was struck by a direct hit from an enemy gun.

On 29 July 1916 he was caught in a gas attack and declared unfit to return to the Front. He returned to Britain, where he served as a gunnery instructor at Lydd from 1917 to 1918. He returned to active duty in October 1918, and served in the Heavy Artillery division of the XI Corps at the Western Front.

After the First World War, Harrison remained with the British military, becoming adjutant of the Royal Military Academy, Woolwich from 1919 until 1921. He transferred from the Royal Marines to the British Army's East Yorkshire Regiment in 1924 and was brevetted lieutenant colonel in 1927. He then spent some years serving in different posts in Asia. He served in Singapore from March 1923 until April 1924, where he was General Staff Officer Grade 3 (GSO3) before being posted to British Malaya until 1925 as GSO 2. Between 1925 and 1928 he served as a GSO2 in the War Office. He was posted to India in 1930, becoming an instructor at the Staff College, Quetta, achieving the full rank of lieutenant colonel in 1932. That same year he was given a role in the Imperial Defence College and from 1932 until 1935 he commanded the 1st Battalion of the Green Howards. From 1935 to 1937 he was a GSO1 of British Troops in China. From 1937 to 1939 he was posted to Palestine, then the scene of an Arab revolt, and, promoted to temporary brigadier on 29 June 1937, he commanded the 14th Infantry Brigade in succession to Brigadier Henry Maitland-Makgill-Crichton. For his services in Palestine Harrison was twice mentioned in despatches, in December 1938, and again in April 1939. For his services whilst in the military Harrison was awarded the Order of the Sacred Treasure of Japan in 1926 and the Companionship of the Bath in 1939. He was still serving, during the Second World War, at the time of his death.
