= 4th Royal Tank Regiment =

Armoured regiment of the British Army

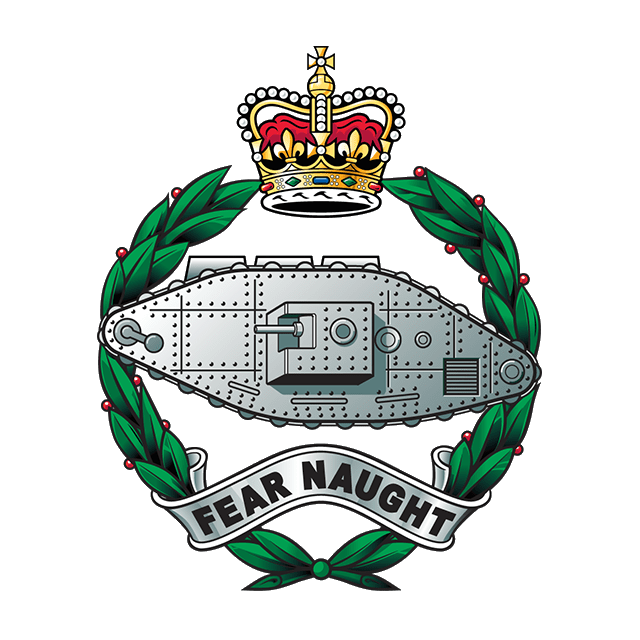
- Cap badge of the Royal Tank Regiment
- Active: 28 July 1917- 1993
- Country: United Kingdom
- Branch: British Army
- Type: Armoured
- Size: Battalion
- Part of: Royal Armoured Corps; Royal Tank Regiment
- Garrison/HQ: Tidworth
- Motto: Fear Naught
- March: Quick: My Boy Willie; Slow: The Royal Tank Regiment Slow March
- Anniversaries: Cambrai, 20 November
- Battle honours: see Battle Honours

Commanders
- Colonel-in-Chief: HM The Queen
- Colonel-Commandant: Lt-General Andrew Peter Ridgway, CB, CBE
- Notable commanders: Hugh Elles

Insignia
- Tartan: Hunting Rose (pipes and drums)

The 4th Royal Tank Regiment (4 RTR) was an armoured regiment of the British Army from its creation in 1917, during World War I, until 1993. It was part of the Royal Tank Regiment, itself part of the Royal Armoured Corps.

== History ==
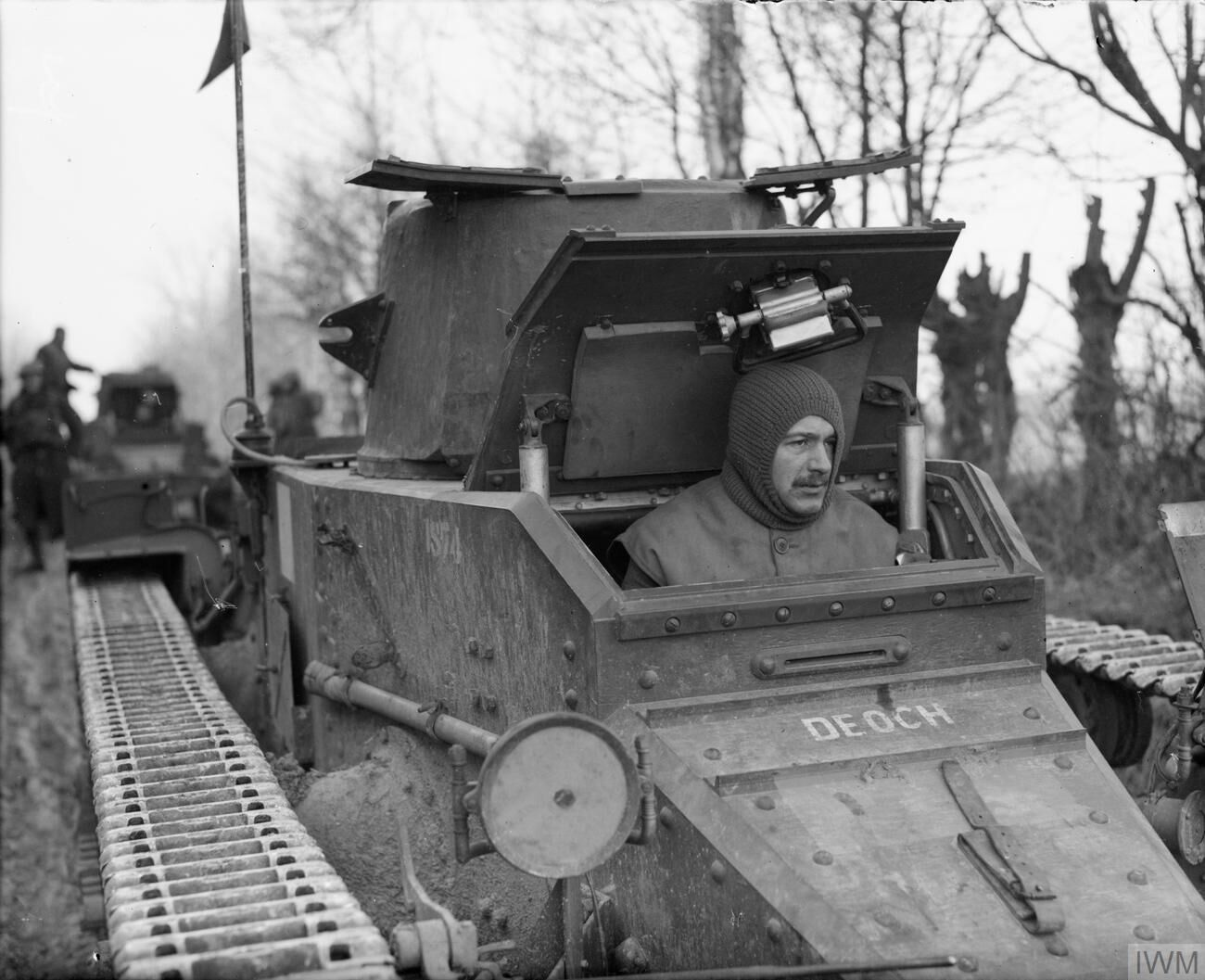
Matilda I tank in France, January 1940

The regiment originally saw action as D Battalion, Tank Corps in 1917. In 1940, it was briefly amalgamated with the 7th Royal Tank Regiment, as the 4th/7th Royal Tank Regiment, returning to its previous title four months later.

4 RTR was in France in 1940 and took part in the counter-attack at Arras. It lost its tanks in the retreat to Dunkirk but was reconstituted in England as a Matilda II regiment. In October, B Squadron was shipped to Port Sudan, with 16 Matilda II tanks, where it served with distinction in the campaign against the Italians in Eritrea.

The rest of the regiment arrived in Egypt and first saw action in May 1941. It took part in Operation Battleaxe, suffering heavy losses.

4 RTR, as part of 32nd Army Tank Brigade, landed in the besieged port of Tobruk on 4 October 1941. From 21 November it took part in the breakout from the Tobruk enclave, linking up with the advancing 2nd New Zealand Division on the night of 26/27 November.

4 RTR was captured at Tobruk on 21 June 1942. On 1 March 1945, 144th Regiment Royal Armoured Corps was re-designated 4th Royal Tank Regiment to replace the original. The newly retitled regiment equipped with Buffalo LVTs took part in Operation Plunder, ferrying troops of 51st Highland Division across the Rhine on the night of 23/24 March 1945. The Commanding Officer (Lt-Col Alan Jolly) carried the same standard that was originally carried across by 17th Armoured Car Battalion of the Royal Tank Corps in the First World War. Once again the RTR was first across the Rhine.

In 1948 it assisted in the ending of the British Mandate over Palestine. In 1959, it was again amalgamated with 7th Royal Tank Regiment, this time without a change of title, and in 1993 due to Options for Change, amalgamated with the 1st Royal Tank Regiment. The traditions of 4 RTR, including their "Chinese Eye" emblem painted on vehicles, is now maintained by Dreadnought Squadron, the fourth squadron of the regiment.

== Commanding officers ==
The Commanding Officers have been:

- 1941: Lt.-Col. W.C.L. O’Carroll
- 1960–1962: Lt.-Col. Thomas S. Craig
- 1962–1964: Lt.-Col. H. Brian C. Watkins
- 1964–1967: Lt.-Col. John A. Cowgill
- 1967–1969: Lt.-Col. Roger B.C. Plowden
- 1969–1971: Lt.-Col. Martin H. Sinnatt
- 1971–1973: Lt.-Col. Laurence A.W. New
- 1973–1976: Lt.-Col. David Sands
- 1976–1978: Lt.-Col. Nicholas H. Cocking
- 1978–1981: Lt.-Col. Michael J. Rose
- 1981–1983: Lt.-Col. Philip J. Sanders
- 1983–1985: Lt.-Col. Hedley D.C. Duncan
- 1985–1988: Lt.-Col. W. Douglas Cantley
- 1988–1990: Lt.-Col. Charles J. McBean
- 1990–1993: Lt.-Col. Martin N.E. Speller

== Awards ==
- Philip John Gardner – Victoria Cross Tobruk 1941
