= Pip Gardner =

Pip Gardner VC MC
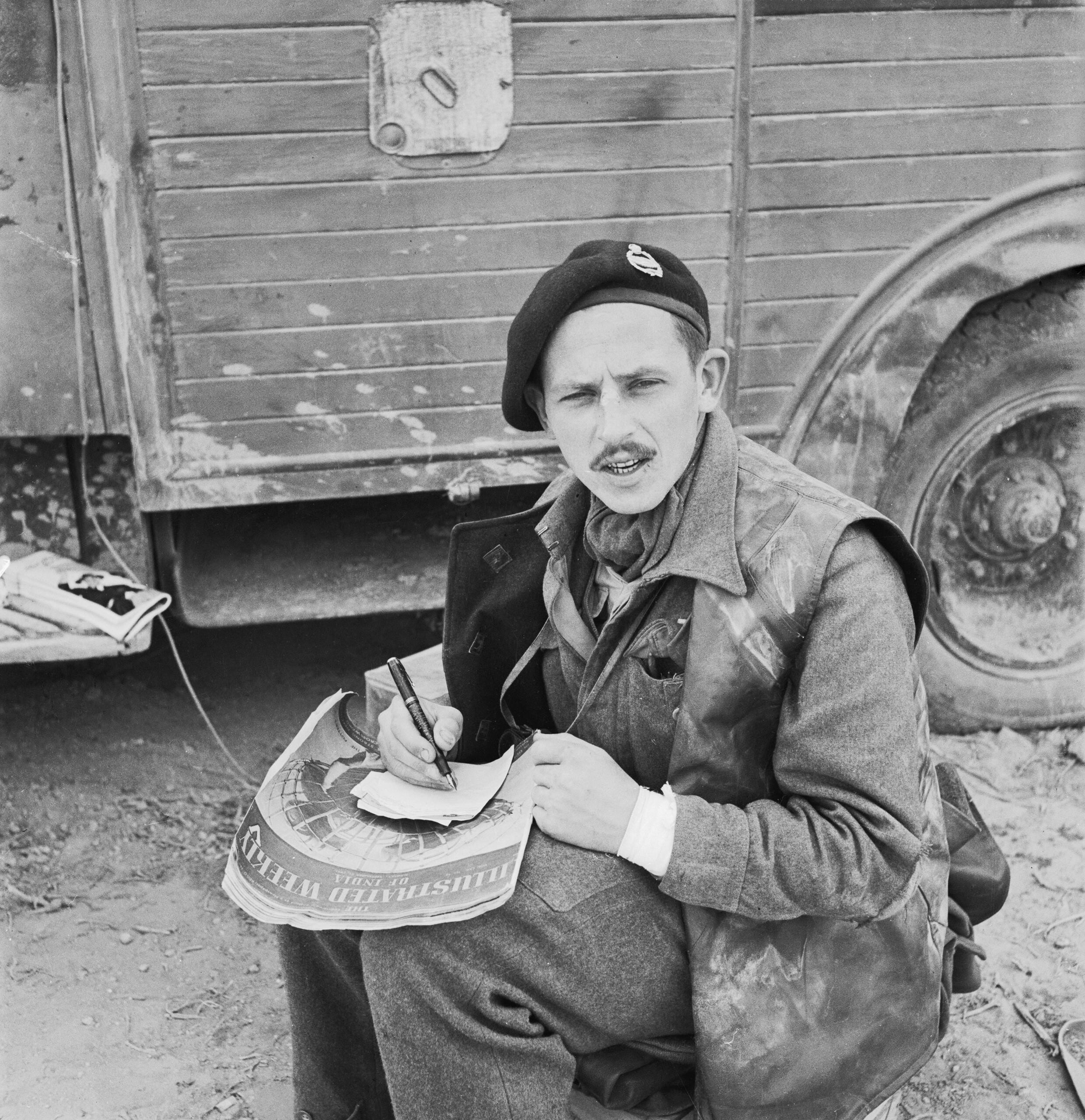
- Philip Gardner in January 1942.
- Born: 18 November 1914; Sydenham, London, England
- Died: 16 February 2003 (aged 88); Hove, East Sussex, England
- Military career
- Allegiance: United Kingdom
- Branch: British Army
- Service years: 1938–1945
- Rank: Captain
- Nickname: "Pip"
- Service number: 132595
- Units: Westminster Dragoons; Royal Tank Regiment
- Conflicts: Second World War
- Awards: Victoria Cross; Military Cross

Captain Philip John Gardner VC MC (25 December 1914 − 16 February 2003) was a British Army officer and an English recipient of the Victoria Cross (VC), the highest and most prestigious award for gallantry in the face of the enemy that can be awarded to British and Commonwealth forces. He was educated at Dulwich College between 1928 and 1932.

Gardner was 26 years old, and an acting captain in the 4th Royal Tank Regiment, attached to the 70th Infantry Division during the Second World War's Siege of Tobruk. During Operation Crusader, an attempt by the Eighth Army to lift the siege, the following deed took place for which Gardner was awarded the Victoria Cross.

On 23 November 1941 at Tobruk, Libya, Captain Gardner was ordered to take two tanks to the rescue of two armoured cars of the King's Dragoon Guards, which were out of action and under heavy attack. While one of his tanks gave covering fire the captain dismounted from the other in the face of heavy fire, hitched a tow rope to one of the cars, then lifted into it an officer, both of whose legs had been blown off. The tow rope broke, so Captain Gardner returned to the armoured car, but was immediately wounded in the neck, arm and leg. Despite this he managed to transfer the wounded man to the second tank and returned to British lines through intense shell-fire.

He was captured after the Battle of Gazala and became a prisoner of war (POW) for the rest of the war. This, unfortunately, resulted in an injury that left him with a deformed toe.

His VC is on display at the Imperial War Museum in London.
