= Hubert Huddleston =

British Army general

Major-General Sir Hubert Huddleston GCMG GBE CB DSO* MC
- Born: 20 January 1880; Norfolk, England
- Died: 2 October 1950 (aged 70)
- Military career
- Allegiance: United Kingdom
- Branch: British Army
- Service years: 1898–1947
- Rank: Major-General
- Service number: 22783
- Units: Coldstream Guards; Dorset Regiment
- Commands: Governor General of Anglo-Egyptian Sudan (1940–1947); Northern Ireland District (1940); Baluchistan District (1935–38); Assam District (1934–1935); 14th Infantry Brigade (1930–1933); Sudan (1924–1930)
- Conflicts: Second Boer War; First World War; Second World War
- Awards: Knight Grand Cross of the Order of St Michael and St George; Knight Grand Cross of the Order of the British Empire; Companion of the Order of the Bath; Distinguished Service Order & Bar; Military Cross; Mentioned in Despatches

Major-General Sir Hubert Jervoise Huddleston, GCMG, GBE, CB, DSO & Bar, MC (20 January 1880 – 2 October 1950) was a senior British Army officer who served as General Officer Commanding (GOC) Northern Ireland District in 1940.

== Military career ==
Educated at Felsted School and Bedford School, Huddleston joined the British Army and was commissioned as a second lieutenant into the Coldstream Guards in 1898.

He then served in the Second Boer War, which began in October 1899. He took part in operations in the Orange Free State from April to May 1900, and the Transvaal in May and June, including actions near Johannesburg and at the Battle of Diamond Hill. During the war he transferred to the Dorsetshire Regiment as a second lieutenant on 26 May 1900, and was promoted to lieutenant on 19 November 1901. He was mentioned in despatches for actions in December 1901 ("for dash and leading ... which lead to captures", dated 25 April 1902). He stayed in South Africa throughout the war, which ended in May 1902 with the Treaty of Vereeniging. Four months later, he left Cape Town with other officers and men of the 2nd Battalion, Dorsetshire Regiment, on the SS German and arrived at Southampton in late October, when they were posted to Portland.

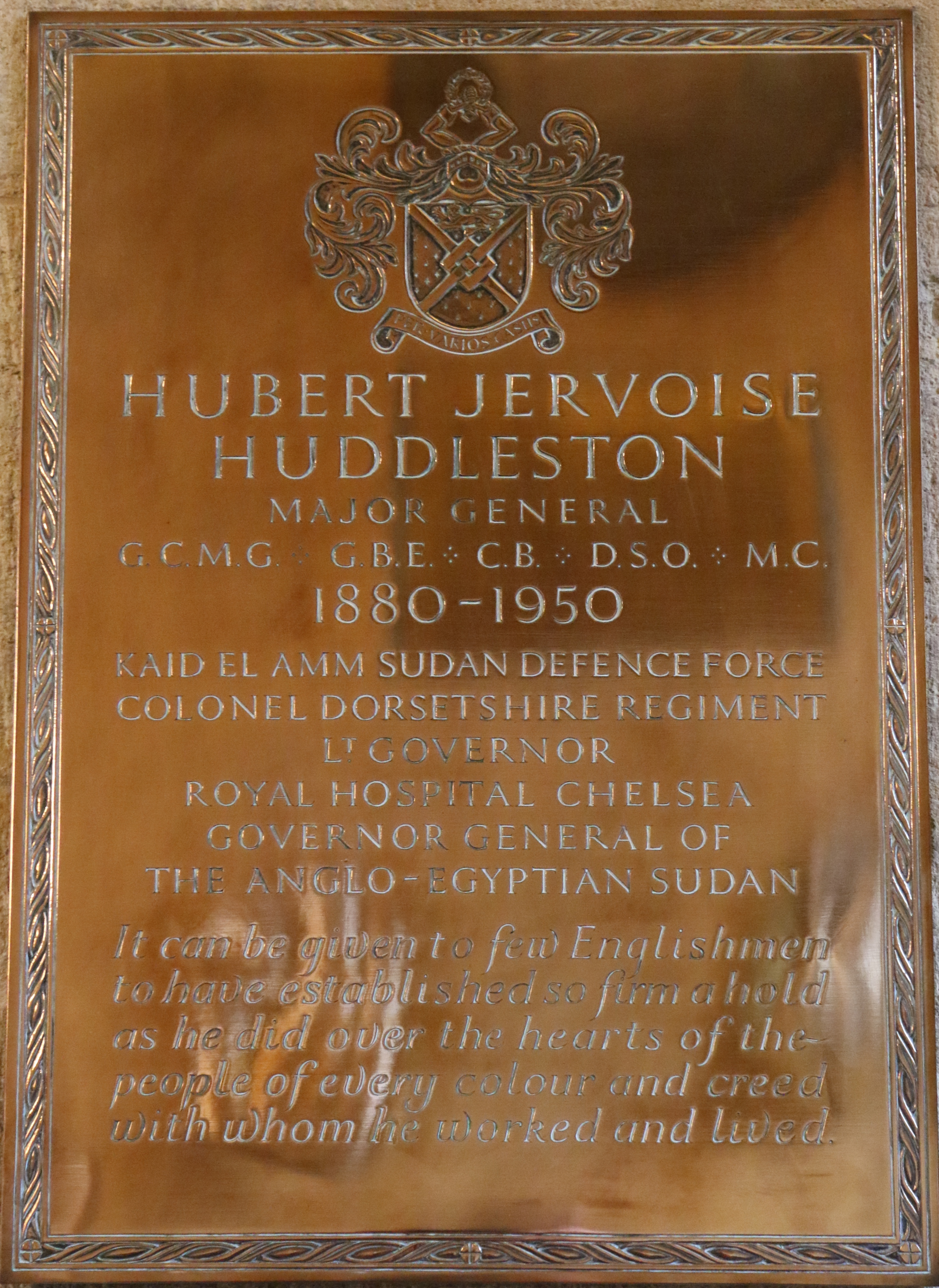
Memorial to Huddleston in Sherborne Abbey.

Huddleston, promoted on 7 March 1908 from supernumerary lieutenant to lieutenant, also served in the First World War, including in the operation in 1916 against Sultan Ali Dinar of Darfur, which resulted in the province being formally incorporated into the Anglo-Egyptian Condominium and end of its monarchy. He was promoted on 1 September 1915 to major.

He became general officer commanding (GOC) Sudan in 1924. He was then appointed commandant of the Sudan Defence Force, the local troops, when they were established a year later. He was appointed a Companion of the Order of the Bath (CB) in the 1925 Birthday Honours.

Having previously been on half-pay, on 14 December 1930 he was appointed commander of the 14th Infantry Brigade and was granted the temporary rank of brigadier whilst employed in this role. After becoming a major general in April 1933, and colonel of the Dorsetshire Regiment in July 1933, he then joined Eastern Command in India in 1934. He became commander of the Baluchistan District in Western Command, India, in 1935. He was appointed lieutenant governor and secretary of the Royal Hospital Chelsea and was then briefly GOC Northern Ireland District from April to July 1940 before being appointed Governor General of Anglo-Egyptian Sudan later that year. He retired from that post in 1947, under pressure from the Foreign Office, after insisting on Sudan's rights to independence from Egypt during disturbances over the future of the Condominium in 1946.

== Bibliography ==
- Smart, Nick (2005). Biographical Dictionary of British Generals of the Second World War. Barnsley, South Yorkshire: Pen and Sword Books. ISBN 1844150496.

Military offices
New command	Commandant of the Sudan Defence Force; 1925–1930	Succeeded by Stephen Butler
Honorary titles
Preceded by Augustus Chichester	Colonel of the Dorsetshire Regiment; 1933–1946	Succeeded by Charles Woodhouse
Military offices
Preceded by Robert Pollok	GOC British Army in Northern Ireland; 1940	Succeeded by Ridley Pakenham-Walsh
