= Operation Crusader orders of battle =

This is the order of battle for the ground forces involved in Operation Crusader, a World War II battle between the British Commonwealth and the European Axis powers of Germany and Italy in North Africa between 18 November – 30 December 1941.

== British and Commonwealth Forces ==
Commander-in-Chief Middle East Command: General Claude Auchinleck

Senior British commanders during Operation Crusader

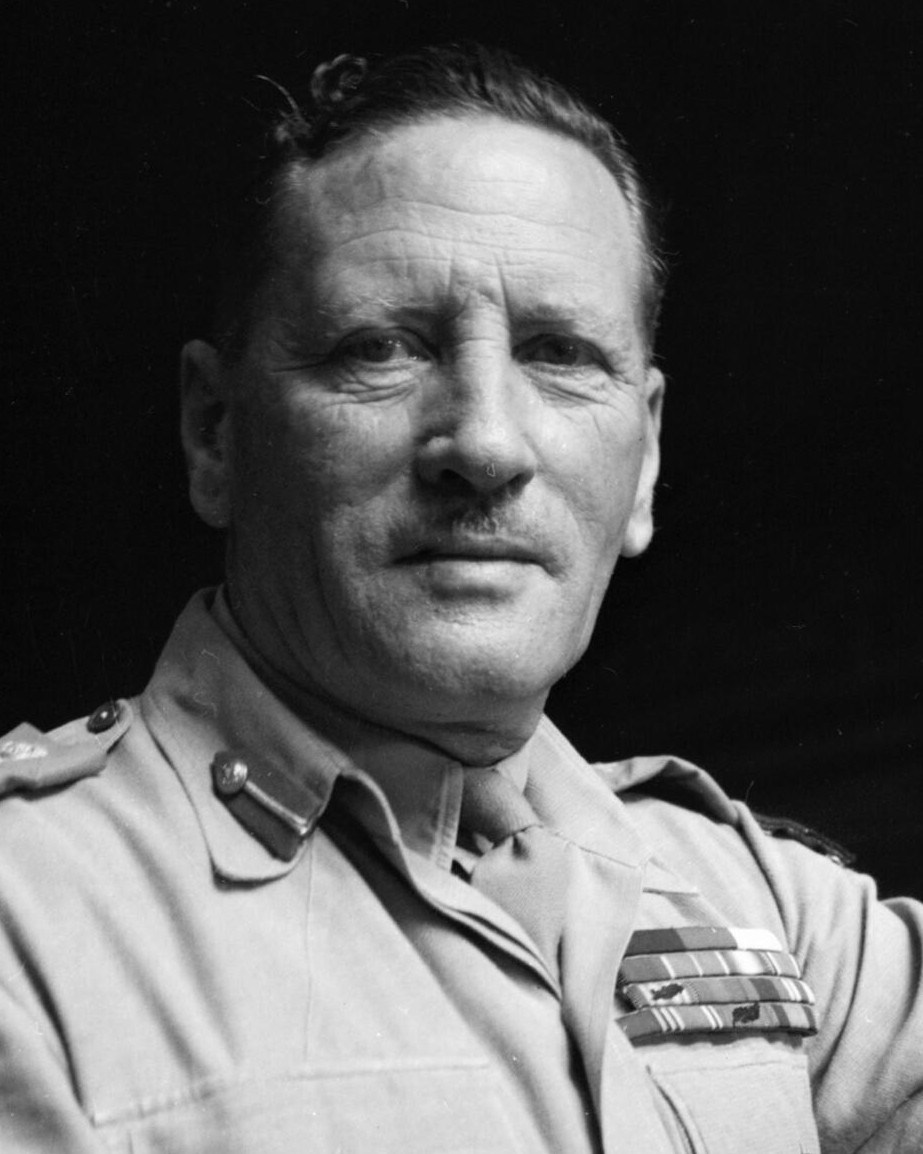
General Claude Auchinleck, theatre commander

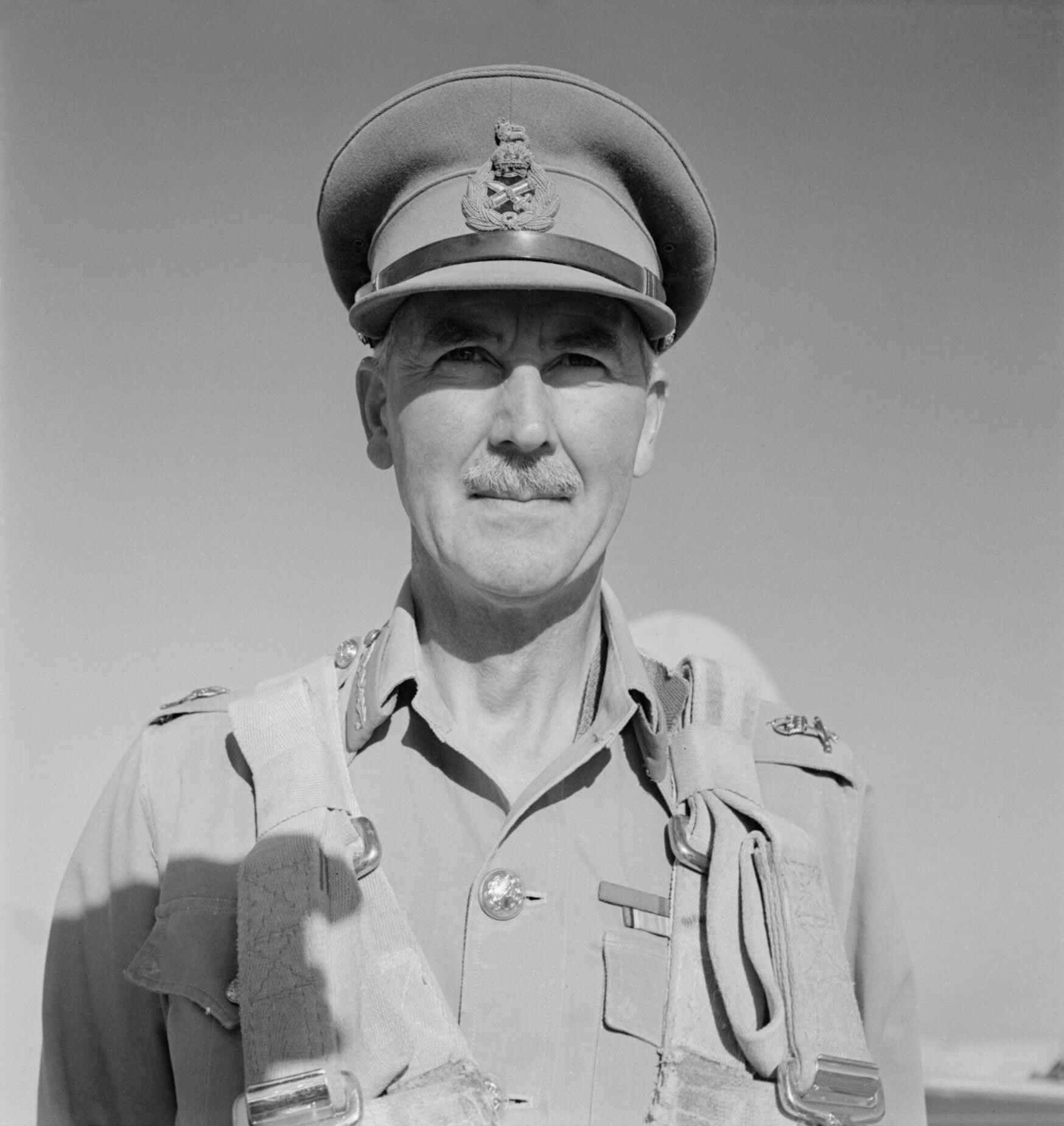
Lt-General Alan Cunningham, commander Eight Army

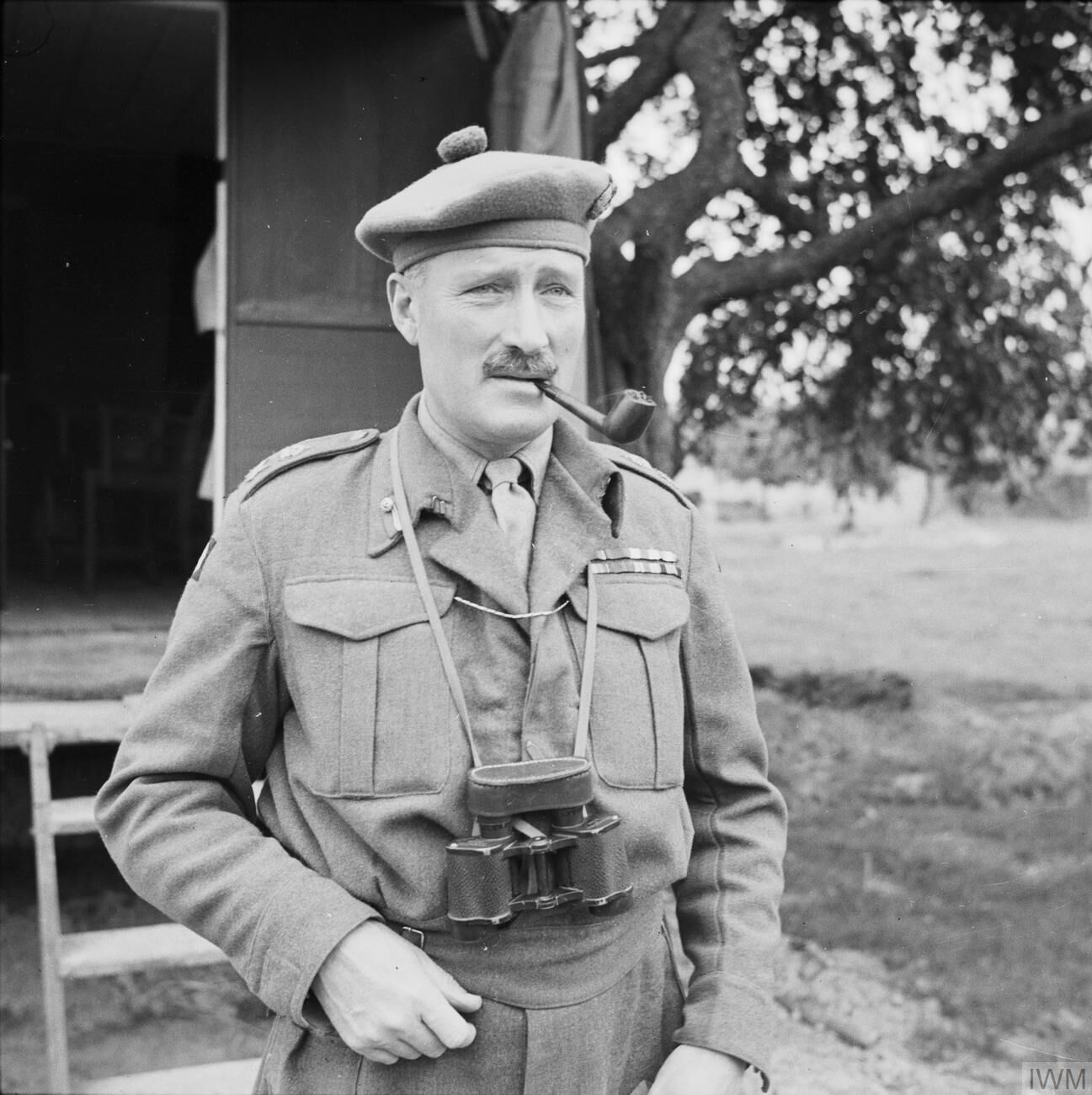
Acting Lt-General Neil Ritchie, commander Eighth Army (seen in Europe in 1944)

=== British Eighth Army ===
Lieutenant-General Alan Cunningham, succeeded on 26 November by Lieutenant-General Neil Ritchie when Auchinleck removed Cunningham from command of Eighth Army

==== XXX Corps ====
Lieutenant-General Willoughby Norrie

- 7th Armoured Division (Major-General William Gott)
  - 4th Armoured Brigade
    - 8th Hussars
    - 3rd Royal Tank Regiment
    - 5th Royal Tank Regiment
    - 2nd Battalion, Scots Guards
    - 2nd Regiment, Royal Horse Artillery
  - 7th Armoured Brigade
    - 7th Hussars
    - 2nd Royal Tank Regiment
    - 6th Royal Tank Regiment
  - 22nd Armoured Brigade
    - 2nd Royal Gloucestershire Hussars
    - 3rd County of London Yeomanry (Sharpshooters)
    - 4th County of London Yeomanry (Sharpshooters)
  - 7th Support Group
    - 3rd Regiment, Royal Horse Artillery
    - 4th Regiment, Royal Horse Artillery
    - 1st Battalion, Kings Royal Rifle Corps
    - 2nd Battalion, Rifle Brigade
    - 60th (North Midland) Field Regiment, Royal Artillery
    - One Battery, 51st (Westmorland and Cumberland) Field Regiment, Royal Artillery
  - Divisional troops
    - 4th South African Armoured Car Regiment
    - King's Dragoon Guards
    - 11th Hussars
    - 1st Light Anti-Aircraft Regiment, Royal Artillery
- 1st South African Division (Major-General George Brink)
  - 1st South African Infantry Brigade
    - 1st Battalion, Duke of Edinburgh's Own Rifles, South African Infantry Corps
    - 1st Battalion, Royal Natal Carabineers, South African Infantry Corps
    - 1st Battalion, Transvaal Scottish Regiment, South African Infantry Corps
    - 3rd Field Artillery Regiment, South African Artillery Corps
  - 5th South African Infantry Brigade
    - Regiment Botha, South African Infantry Corps
    - South African Irish Regiment, South African Infantry Corps
    - 3rd Battalion, Transvaal Scottish Regiment, South African Infantry Corps
    - 4th Field Artillery Regiment, South African Artillery Corps
- 22nd Guards Brigade
  - 9th Battalion, Rifle Brigade (Tower Hamlets Rifles)
  - 3rd Battalion, Coldstream Guards

==== XIII Corps ====
Lieutenant-General Reade Godwin-Austen

- 2nd New Zealand Division (Major-General Bernard Freyberg VC)
  - 4th New Zealand Infantry Brigade
    - 18th Infantry Battalion
    - 19th Infantry Battalion
    - 20th Infantry Battalion
  - 5th New Zealand Infantry Brigade
    - 21st Infantry Battalion
    - 22nd Infantry Battalion
    - 23rd Infantry Battalion
  - 6th New Zealand Infantry Brigade
    - 24th Infantry Battalion
    - 25th Infantry Battalion
    - 26th Infantry Battalion
  - Divisional troops
    - 27th (Machine Gun) Infantry Battalion
    - 28th (Maori) Infantry Battalion
    - 4th Field Regiment
    - 5th Field Regiment
    - 6th Field Regiment
    - 7th Anti-Tank Regiment
    - 14th Light Anti-Aircraft Regiment
    - Divisional Cavalry Regiment

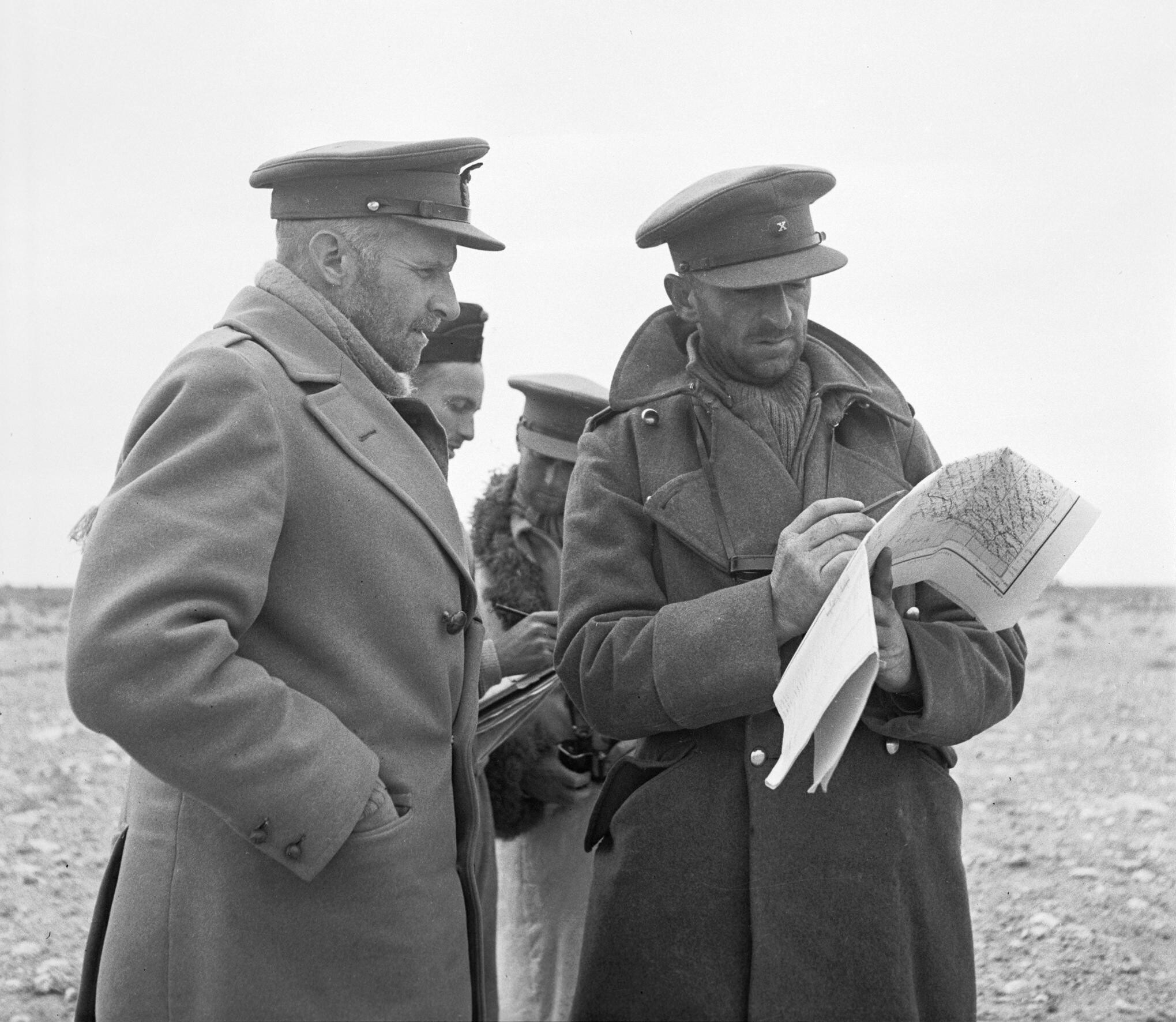
Messervy giving orders, December 1941

- 4th Indian Infantry Division (Major-General Frank Messervy)
  - 5th Indian Infantry Brigade
    - 1st Battalion, The Buffs
    - 3rd Battalion, 1st Punjab Regiment
    - 4th Battalion (Outram's), 6th Rajputana Rifles
  - 7th Indian Infantry Brigade
    - 1st Battalion, Royal Sussex Regiment
    - 4th Battalion, 11th Sikh Regiment
    - 4th Battalion, 16th Punjab Regiment
  - 11th Indian Infantry Brigade
    - 2nd Battalion, Queen's Own Cameron Highlanders
    - 2nd Battalion, 5th Mahratta Light Infantry
    - 1st Battalion (Wellesley's), 6th Rajputana Rifles
  - Divisional troops
    - The Central India Horse (21st King George V's Own Horse) (Reconnaissance)
    - 1st Field Regiment, Royal Artillery
    - 25th Field Regiment, Royal Artillery
    - 31st Field Regiment, Royal Artillery
- 1st Army Tank Brigade
  - 8th Royal Tank Regiment - equipped with Valentine infantry tanks (Lt Col Brooke)
  - 42nd Royal Tank Regiment( Lt Col Willison later Lt Col Martin)
  - 44th Royal Tank Regiment - Matilda II infantry tanks (Lt Col Yeo)

==== Tobruk Fortress ====
Major-General Ronald Scobie

- 70th Infantry Division
  - 14th Infantry Brigade
    - 1st Battalion, Bedfordshire and Hertfordshire Regiment
    - 2nd Battalion, Black Watch
    - 2nd Battalion, York and Lancaster Regiment
  - 16th Infantry Brigade
    - 2nd Battalion, King's Own Royal Regiment
    - 2nd Battalion, Leicestershire Regiment
    - 2nd Battalion, Queen's Royal Regiment
  - 23rd Infantry Brigade
    - 1st Battalion, Durham Light Infantry
    - 1st Battalion, Essex Regiment
    - 4th Battalion, Border Regiment
- Polish Independent Carpathian Rifle Brigade
  - I Carpathian Rifle Battalion
  - II Carpathian Rifle Battalion
  - III Carpathian Rifle Battalion
  - 11 Czechoslovak Infantry Battalion
  - 2/13th Australian Infantry Battalion (Note: the "2" prefix indicated the unit was part of Second Australian Imperial Force and separate from similar named militia unit in Australia)
  - Carpathian Machine Gun Battalion
  - Carpathian Field Regiment
- 32nd Army Tank Brigade (Brigadier A.C. Willison)
  - 1st Royal Tank Regiment
  - 4th Royal Tank Regiment
  - 'D' Squadron 7th Royal Tank Regiment
- 4th Anti-Aircraft Brigade (Brigadier John Muirhead)
  - 69th (Royal Warwickshire Regiment) Heavy Anti-Aircraft Regiment, Royal Artillery
  - 13th Light Anti-Aircraft Regiment, Royal Artillery
  - 14th Light Anti-Aircraft Regiment, Royal Artillery
  - 1 and 5 Independent Light Anti-Aircraft Batteries, Royal Artillery
  - 306 Battery, 27th (London Electrical Engineers) Searchlight Regiment, Royal Artillery

==== Oasis Force ====
Brigadier Denys Reid

- 29th Indian Infantry Brigade
  - 1st Battalion, Worcestershire Regiment
  - 3rd Battalion, 2nd Punjab Regiment
  - 1st Battalion, 5th Mahratta Light Infantry
- 6th South African Armoured Car Regiment

==== Army Reserve ====
- 2nd South African Division (Major-General Isaac de Villiers)
  - 3rd South African Infantry Brigade
    - Imperial Light Horse, South African Infantry Corps
    - Rand Light Infantry, South African Infantry Corps
    - 1st Battalion, Royal Durban Light Infantry, South African Infantry Corps
    - 1st Field Artillery Regiment, South African Artillery Corps
  - 4th South African Infantry Brigade
    - Kaffrarian Rifles, South African Infantry Corps
    - Umvoti Mounted Rifles, South African Infantry Corps
    - 2nd Battalion, Royal Durban Light Infantry, South African Infantry Corps
    - 2nd Field Artillery Regiment, South African Artillery Corps
  - 6th South African Infantry Brigade
    - 1st South African Police Battalion
    - 2nd South African Police Battalion
    - 2nd Battalion, Transvaal Scottish Regiment, South African Infantry Corps
    - 5th Field Artillery Regiment, South African Artillery Corps

== German and Italian forces ==
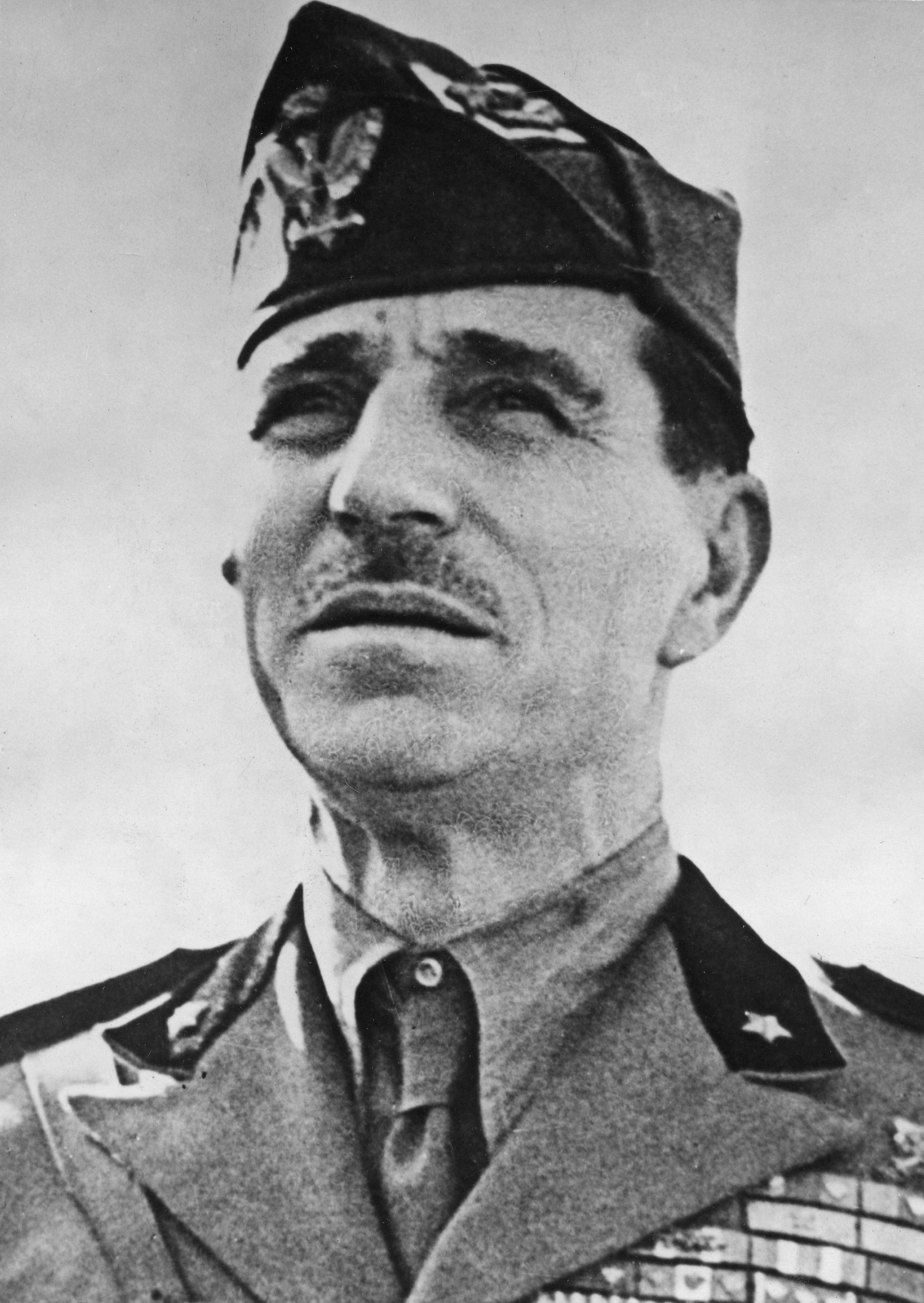
Ettore Bastico, Governor-General of Italian Libya and commander-in-chief of all Axis forces in North Africa. (seen in August 1942)

Supreme Commander North Africa: General Ettore Bastico

=== Italian XX Army Corps ===
Italian XX Army Corps also known as Maneuver Army Corps (Corpo d'Armata di Manovra) commanded by Lieutenant-General Gastone Gambara

- Corps assets:
  - Three batteries of truck-mounted 102 mm AA/AT guns (Note: Naval Blackshirts crews)
- 132nd Armoured Division "Ariete" (General Mario Balotta)
  - 8th Bersaglieri Regiment
    - III Support Weapons Battalion
    - V Auto-transported Battalion
    - XII Auto-transported Battalion
  - 32nd Tank Infantry Regiment
    - I Tank Battalion L with L3/35 tankettes
    - II Tank Battalion L with L3/35 tankettes
    - (III Tank Battalion L with L3/35 tankettes — detached to the Maneuver Army Corps Reconnaissance Grouping)
  - 132nd Tank Infantry Regiment
    - VII Tank Battalion M13/40 with M13/40 tanks
    - VIII Tank Battalion M13/40 with M13/40 tanks
    - IX Tank Battalion M13/40 with M13/40 tanks
  - 132nd Artillery Regiment
    - I Group with 75/27 mod. 11 field guns
    - II Group with 75/27 mod. 11 field guns
    - III Group with 105/28 cannons
  - II Anti-tank Battalion with 47/32 anti-tank guns (formed in September 1941 and disbanded in February 1942)
  - III Tank Group "Nizza Cavalleria" with L6/40 tanks light tanks (Armoured reconnaissance, arrived in September 1941)
  - CXXXII Mixed Engineer Battalion
  - attached: 1× group from the 26th Artillery Regiment "Pavia", 17th Infantry Division "Pavia" with 75/27 mod. 11 field guns
  - attached: 1× group from the 24th Corps Artillery Grouping, with 105/28 cannons
- 101st Motorised Division "Trieste"
  - 9th Bersaglieri Regiment
    - XXVIII Auto-transported Battalion
    - XXX Auto-transported Battalion
    - XXXII Support Weapons Battalion
  - 65th Infantry Regiment "Trieste"
    - 3× fusilier battalions
  - 66th Infantry Regiment "Trieste"
    - 3× fusilier battalions
  - 21st Artillery Regiment "Trieste"
    - I Group with 100/17 mod. 16 howitzers
    - II Group with 75/27 mod. 06 field guns
    - III Group with 75/27 mod. 06 field guns
    - IX Group with 105/28 cannons (joined the regiment in June 1941)
    - XXI Mixed Anti-aircraft Group (joined the regiment in June 1941)
  - DVIII Support Weapons Battalion
  - LII Mixed Engineer Battalion
- RECAM (Raggruppamento Esplorante del Corpo d'Armata di Manovra — Maneuver Army Corps Reconnaissance Grouping)
  - III Tank Battalion L with L3/35 tankettes (from the 32nd Tank Infantry Regiment, 132nd Armoured Division "Ariete")
  - LII Tank Battalion M13/40 with M13/40 tanks
  - Battalion "Romolo Gessi" (Italian African Police) (Note: Two motorcycle and one armoured car companies)
  - Battalion Group "Giovani Fascisti" (2× battalions)
  - Raggruppamento Batterie Volanti ("Portees" - truck mounted - Artillery Group) (Note: Two battalions with Cannone da 65/17 modello 13, one battery with Obice da 100/17 and one battery with 20 mm Breda 35 light AA/AT)

=== Panzer Group Africa ===
Panzer Group Africa commanded by General der Panzertruppe Erwin Rommel

German Afrika Korps (commanded by Generalleutnant Ludwig Crüwell)

- 15th Panzer Division (Generalmajor Walter Neumann-Silkow until 6 December (killed in action), then Generalmajor Gustav von Vaerst)
  - 8th Panzer Regiment (2× battalions)
  - 1st Battalion, 115th Infantry Regiment
  - 2nd Machine Gun Battalion
  - 3rd Engineers Battalion
  - 33rd Recon Battalion
  - 33rd Anti-tank Battalion
  - 33rd Artillery Regiment
- 21st Panzer Division (Generalmajor Johann von Ravenstein until 29 November (prisoner of war), then Generalmajor Karl Böttcher)
  - 5th Panzer Regiment (2× battalions)
  - 104th Infantry Regiment (2× battalions)
  - 15th Motorcycle Battalion
  - 3rd Reconnaissance Battalion
  - 200th Engineers Battalion
  - 39th Anti-Tank Battalion
  - 605th Anti-Tank Battalion
  - 155th Artillery Regiment
- Special Purpose Division Afrika (Renamed 90th Light Africa Division from 28 November 1941) (Generalmajor Max Sümmermann until 10 December (killed in action), then Generalmajor Richard Veith)
  - 155th Infantry Regiment (3 bns)
  - 3rd Battalion, 255th Infantry Regiment
  - 3rd Battalion, 347th Infantry Regiment
  - 361st Infantry Regiment (2× battalions)
  - 900th Engineers Battalion
  - 580th Recon Battalion
  - Elements from the 300th "Oasis" Battalion
  - 2nd Battalion, 115th Motor Artillery Regiment
  - 2nd Fast Artillery Regiment "Emanuele Filiberto Testa di Ferro" (Italian)
    - I Group with 100/17 mod. 14 howitzers
    - II Group with 100/17 mod. 14 howitzers
    - III Group with 75/27 mod. 06 field guns
    - IV Group with 75/27 mod. 06 field guns
- 55th Infantry Division "Savona" (General Fedele de Giorgis)
  - 15th Infantry Regiment "Savona"
    - 3× fusilier battalions
  - 16th Infantry Regiment "Savona"
    - 3× fusilier battalions
  - 12th Artillery Regiment "Savona", in Capua
    - I Group with 100/17 mod. 14 howitzers
    - II Group with 105/28 cannons
  - IV Machine Gun Squadrons Group "Genova Cavalleria" (attached to the division)
  - CLV Machine Gun Battalion
  - LV Mixed Engineer Battalion
  - Elements, from the 300th "Oasis" Battalion (German)

==== Italian XXI Army Corps ====
Italian XXI Army Corps commanded by Lieutenant-General Enea Navarini

- Corps assets:
  - 3rd Fast Artillery Regiment "Principe Amedeo Duca d'Aosta"
    - I Group with 100/17 mod. 14 howitzers
    - II Group with 100/17 mod. 14 howitzers
    - III Group with 75/27 mod. 06 field guns
    - IV Group with 75/27 mod. 06 field guns
  - 8th Army Artillery Grouping (Note: One Cannone da 149/28, one 149L40 and one 152L37 groups)
  - 16th Army Corps Artillery Grouping (Note: Three Cannone da 105/28 groups)
  - 24th Army Corps Artillery Grouping (Note: Four Cannone da 149/35 A groups)
  - 340th Guardia alla Frontiera Artillery Grouping
    - 4× groups with 75/27 mod. 06 field guns
  - CCCXL Guardia alla Frontiera Engineer Battalion
- 17th Infantry Division "Pavia"
  - 27th Infantry Regiment "Pavia"
    - 3× fusilier battalions
  - 28th Infantry Regiment "Pavia"
    - 3× fusilier battalions
  - 26th Artillery Regiment "Pavia" (reformed on 18 April 1941 in Ferrara, after the original regiment was destroyed in February 1941 during Operation Compass)
    - III Group with 75/27 mod. 06 field guns
    - CCLXXXIII Group with 2x batteries of 75/27 mod. 06 field guns and 1x battery of 77/28 field guns (transferred from the Guardia alla Frontiera)
    - CCLXXXIV Group with 75/27 mod. 06 field guns (transferred from the Guardia alla Frontiera)
  - V Tank Battalion L with L3/35 tankettes (attached to the division)
  - LXIX Machine Gun Battalion
  - II Group/ 24th Artillery Regiment "Piemonte" with 75/27 mod. 11 field guns (attached to the division)
  - XLII Artillery Group with 105/28 cannons (group formed by the 6th Army Corps Artillery Regiment and attached to the division)
  - XVII Mixed Engineer Battalion
- 25th Infantry Division "Bologna"
  - 39th Infantry Regiment "Bologna"
    - 3× fusilier battalions
  - 40th Infantry Regiment "Bologna"
    - 3× fusilier battalions
  - 205th Artillery Regiment "Bologna"
    - I Group with 100/17 mod. 14 howitzers
    - II Group with 100/17 mod. 14 howitzers (disbanded and personnel distributed among other artillery regiments in October 1941; reformed in May 1942)
    - III Group with 75/27 mod. 06 field guns
    - IV Group with 75/27 mod. 06 field guns
  - IV Tank Battalion L with L3/33 and L3/35 tankettes (attached to the division)
  - X Machine Gun Battalion
  - XXV Mixed Engineer Battalion
- CCCLVII Group with 75/27 mod. 06 field guns (Guardia alla Frontiera artillery unit)
- 27th Infantry Division "Brescia"
  - 19th Infantry Regiment "Brescia"
    - 3× fusilier battalions
  - 20th Infantry Regiment "Brescia"
    - 3× fusilier battalions
  - 1st Fast Artillery Regiment "Eugenio di Savoia" (replaced the division's 55th Artillery Regiment "Brescia", which was destroyed in February 1941 during Operation Compass)
    - I Group with 100/17 mod. 14 howitzers
    - II Group with 100/17 mod. 14 howitzers
    - III Group with 75/27 mod. 06 field guns
    - IV Group with 75/27 mod. 06 field guns
  - XXVII Machine Gun Battalion
  - XXVII Mixed Engineer Battalion
- 102nd Motorised Division "Trento"
  - 7th Bersaglieri Regiment
    - VIII Support Weapons Battalion
    - X Auto-transported Battalion
    - XI Auto-transported Battalion
  - 61st Infantry Regiment "Trento"
    - 3× fusilier battalions
  - 62nd Infantry Regiment "Trento"
    - 3× fusilier battalions
  - 46th Artillery Regiment "Trento"
    - I Group with 100/17 mod. 14 howitzers
    - II Group with 100/17 mod. 14 howitzers; joined the regiment in spring 1941
    - III Group with 75/27 mod. 06 field guns
    - IV Group with 75/27 mod. 06 field guns
  - XLIII Anti-aircraft/Anti-tank Group with 75/50 (attached to the division from March 1941)
  - LXI Machine Gun Battalion
  - DLI Support Weapons Battalion
  - LI Mixed Engineer Battalion

== Bibliography ==
- Gen Sir Martin Farndale, History of the Royal Regiment of Artillery: The Years of Defeat: Europe and North Africa, 1939–1941, Woolwich: Royal Artillery Institution, 1988/London: Brasseys, 1996, ISBN 1-85753-080-2.
- Heddlesten, James (17 February 2010). "Libya September 1941 OoB". Comando Supremo: Italy at War website.
- Moreman, Tim (2007). Desert Rats: British 8th Army in North Africa 1941-43. Battle Orders No. 28. Consultant editor Dr Duncan Anderson. Osprey. p. 61. ISBN 978-1-84603-144-1.
- Paterson, Ian A. "History of the British 7th Armoured Division: Divisional Organisation". Archived from the original on 21 June 2007.
- Maj-Gen I.S.O. Playfair (1956), The Mediterranean and Middle East Vol II: The Germans come to the aid of their Ally (1941), History of the Second World War, United Kingdom Military Series, London: HMSO – via Hyperwar Foundation
- Brig N.W. Routledge, History of the Royal Regiment of Artillery: Anti-Aircraft Artillery 1914–55, London: Royal Artillery Institution/Brassey's, 1994, ISBN 1-85753-099-3
- "Eighth Army OOB. 18th November 1941". Orders of Battle.com.
- Liddell Hart, B H. The North African Campaign 1940–43.
