= 2nd South African Infantry Division =

Infantry division of the Union of South Africa during World War II

- Active: 23 October 1940 – 21 June 1942
- Disbanded: 21 Jun 1942
- Country: South Africa
- Allegiance: Allied forces of World War II
- Branch: South African Army
- Type: Infantry
- Size: Division
- Battle honours: Clayden's Trench (Sollum): Jan 1942, Gazala: Jun 1942, Tobruk: Jun 1942

Commanders
- First: From 23 Oct 1940: Major General IP de Villiers
- Second: From 26 Jul 1941: Brigadier FH Theron (acting)
- Final: From 5 Sep 1941: Major General IP de Villiers and from 14 May 1942: Major General HB Klopper

Insignia
- Identification symbol

The South African 2nd Infantry Division was an infantry division of the army of the Union of South Africa during World War II. The division was formed on 23 October 1940 and served in the Western Desert Campaign and was captured (save for one brigade) by German and Italian forces at Tobruk on 21 June 1942. The remaining brigade was re-allocated to the South African 1st Infantry Division.

== History ==
The division was formed on 23 October 1940 with its divisional HQ at Voortrekkerhoogte, South Africa. On 21 June 1942 two complete infantry brigades of the division as well as most of the supporting units were captured at the fall of Tobruk.

=== Bardia and the Western Desert ===
The division capture of Bardia was part of the Libyan campaign against Rommel's Afrika Korps from November 1941 to January 1942. They defeated a numerically superior Axis force in a strongly fortified position with a combined infantry and tank force.

==== Order of battle ====
21 September 1941

- 3rd South African Infantry Brigade
  - Comd. Brig. C. E. Borain DSO MC VD ED
  - Troops
    - 1st Imperial Light Horse
    - 1st Rand Light Infantry
    - 1st Kaffrarian Rifles (under command from 1000 hrs 25 Dec. 41)
    - B and C Companies, Durban Mounted Rifles (D.M.R.)
    - 2nd South African Field Company, less one section
    - One section, 10th South African Field Company
    - One platoon, 4th Brigade Signal Company (under command from 1000 hrs 26 Dec.)
    - 5th Brigade Signal Company, less one platoon
    - 3rd South African Brigade 'Q' Services Company
    - Three detachments, 14th South African Field Ambulance (under command from D.-1)
  - With in support:
    - One regiment, 1st Army Tank Brigade
    - Artillery as arranged by C.R.A.
  - Task:
    - To attack Bardia through the perimeter defences as described in Para 6(a) and in Operation Instruction No. 21 (Appx 'A'). (Note: "2 S.A. Div. Operation Instruction No. 21," issued 24 December 1941 in conjunction with 2 S.A. Div Operation Order No. 2, addressed to Brig. C. E. Borain, MC, VD, 3rd South African Infantry Brigade. Borain was to command the force detailed in para 7(a) of Operation Order No. 2, with one regiment of the 1st Army Tank Brigade in support. On the night of D-1/D1, two infantry battalions with engineer detachments were to cut gaps in the wire, fill the tank ditch and clear minefields to establish a bridgehead between 51973860 and 51573903, completed at least 30 minutes before first light on D1. At zero hour on D1, "I" tanks were to move through the gaps on a one-squadron front: the right-flank squadron (51973860–51843878) followed by the infantry battalion holding that flank, mopping up as they went; the left-flank squadron (51803887–51573903) was to advance without infantry support directly toward the objective, then work round to meet the right-flank force. Once the left-flank tanks had passed through, the battalion holding that bridgehead was to advance behind a further tank detachment. The Kaffrarian Rifles, supported by three troops of the 2nd Anti-Tank Regiment and two platoons of the Durban Mounted Rifles, were to move into position before zero hour and, once the left-flank battalion had advanced from its bridgehead, establish a flank facing west to link up with that advance; by the end of Phase 1 the Kaffrarian Rifles were to be positioned so as to join the tanks' advance in Phase 2. On completion of the mopping-up, the infantry was to establish a line from 52263920 along the high ground to 51673947, thence to 51573903, with tanks rallying at a point chosen by the tank commander as counter-attack reserve. Artillery support was arranged separately in consultation with Brig. Watkins and the C.R.A.; if the objective was not reached by the end of the day, the brigade was to consolidate on the line held. (Sgd) I. P. de Villiers, Major-General, G.O.C. 2 S.A. Div. (U.D.F.). Time of signature 2305 hrs.)
- NORTHFORCE
  - Comd. Lt. Col. J. Butler-Porter VD, 1st Royal Durban Light Infantry
  - Troops
    - 1st Royal Durban Light Infantry
    - Section, 2nd South African Field Company
    - Platoon, 5th Brigade Signal Company
    - Detachment, 16th Field Ambulance (under command from 1000 hrs 26 Dec.)
  - With in support:
    - New Zealand Divisional Cavalry Regiment, less one squadron
  - Task:
    - To contain and demonstrate against enemy forces within the perimeter along the general line of enemy defences from incl 51143960 – incl 51554030, in accordance with Operation Instruction No. 22 (Appx 'C'). (Note: The full text of this operation instruction was not reproduced in the published intelligence bulletin.)
- KINGFORCE
  - Comd. Lt. Col. W. Kingwell MC, Durban Mounted Rifles (D.M.R.)
  - Troops
    - Durban Mounted Rifles (D.M.R.), less B, C and D Companies and one platoon of A Company
    - Two platoons, 7th South African Armoured Reconnaissance Battalion
    - Detachment, 4th South African Field Company (under command from 1000 hrs 26 Dec.)
  - With in support:
    - One squadron, New Zealand Divisional Cavalry Regiment
  - Task:
    - To contain and demonstrate against enemy forces along the general line of the perimeter defences from incl 51973860 – excl 51143960, in accordance with Operation Instruction No. 23 (Appx 'D').
- SOUTHFORCE
  - Comd. Maj. P. J. Jacobs, 7th South African Armoured Reconnaissance Battalion
  - Troops
    - 7th South African Armoured Reconnaissance Battalion, less one company and two platoons
    - Detachment, 4th South African Field Company
    - Detachment, 14th South African Field Ambulance (under command from 1000 hrs 26 Dec.)
  - Task:
    - To contain and demonstrate against enemy forces along the general line of perimeter defences from incl Marsa er Ramla 52423868 – excl 51973860, in accordance with Operation Instruction No. 24 (Appx 'E').
- RESERVES
  - Comd. Lt. Col. R. J. Palmer, 1st South African Police
  - Troops
    - One regiment, 1st Army Tank Brigade
    - 1st South African Police
    - Section, 4th South African Field Company
    - Detachment, 14th South African Field Ambulance
  - Task:
    - To rendezvous by Zero and remain in an area selected by the force commander, not more than 5,000 yards from the perimeter defences, ready to carry out Phase 2 in accordance with Operation Instruction No. 25 (Appx 'D') on receipt of orders from the Division Commander. (Note: "2 S.A. Div. Operation Instruction No. 25" (Appx 'D' of this bulletin), issued 24 December 1941 in conjunction with 2 S.A. Div Operation Order No. 2, addressed to Lt. Col. R. J. Palmer, 1st South African Police. Palmer's force was to remain in general reserve until Phase 2, then advance on the enemy positions on a two squadron/battalion front, with the 1st South African Police and the Kaffrarian Rifles each following a squadron of "I" tanks; to establish a line on the high ground 51673947–51303970–51133973 and make contact with the Imperial Light Horse on the right flank. (Sgd) I. P. de Villiers, Major-General, G.O.C. 2 S.A. Div. (U.D.F.). Time of signature 0730 hrs, 25 Dec.)

(Note: (Sgd) H.B. Klopper, Colonel, General Staff. Issued through Sigs and L. Os. Time of signature 2300 hrs.)

=== Surrender ===
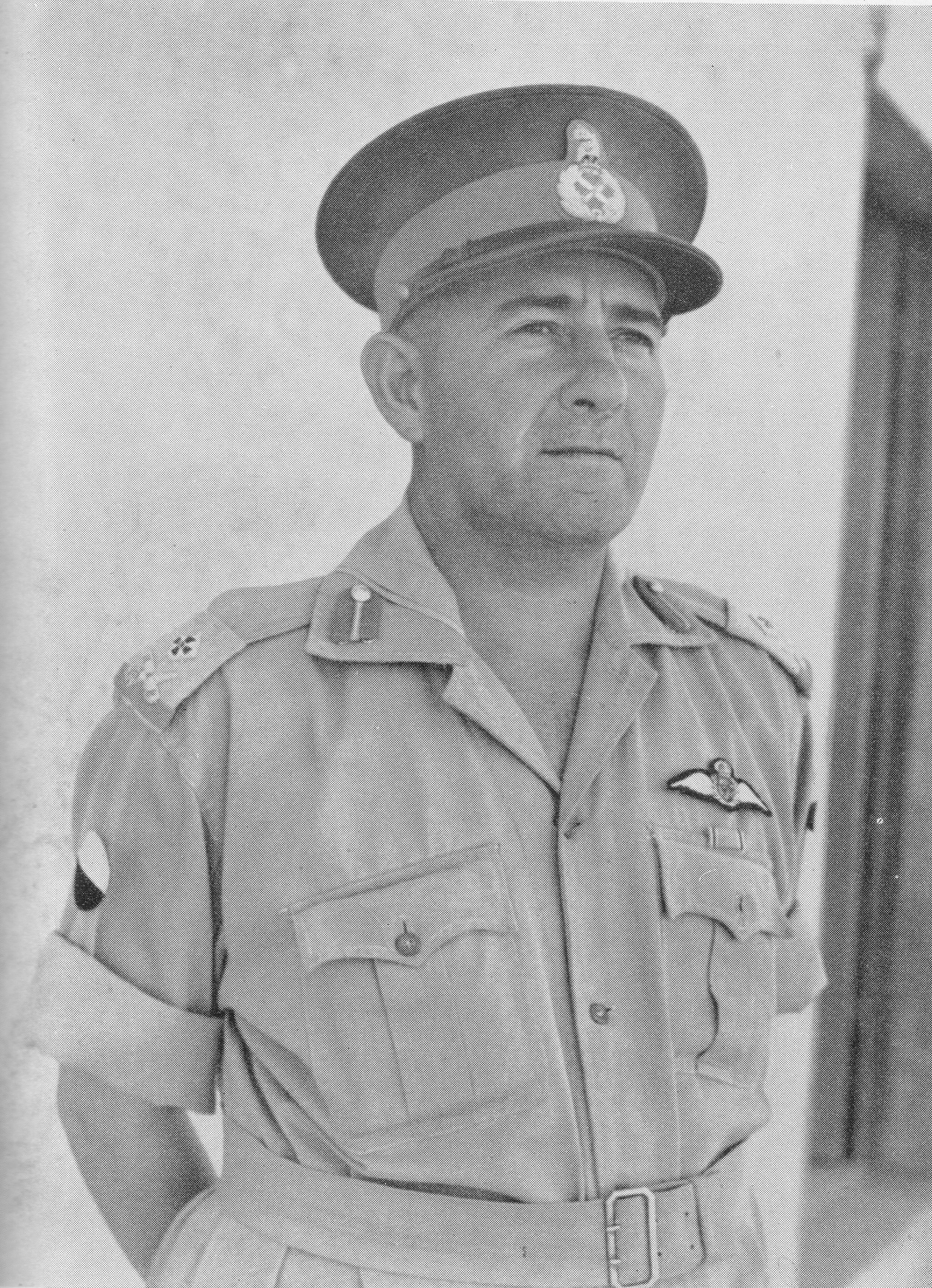
Maj.Gen. H. B. Klopper, Commander 2nd SA Inf Div at the surrender of Tobruk. (South African National War Museum)

After the capture of the rest of the division, 3rd South African Infantry Brigade and the 1st Field Regiment of the Cape Field Artillery became part of the South African 1st Infantry Division.

== Order of battle ==
=== Initial operational deployment: 2 December 1941 ===
On 18 September 1941 the division was re-allocated from X Corps command to falling under General HQ command and were responsible for protecting the railway and water supply lines between Alexandria and Mersa Matruh. On 11 October, the Kaffrarian Rifles were detached from the division and deployed to protect the landing fields in the Daba-Fuka-Bagush area. On taking over responsibility for the Frontier area on 2 December 1941 the divisional order of battle, as part of the 8th Army was:

- HQ 2nd Infantry Division (Maj-Gen I. P. de Villiers CB MC KStJ)
  - One Squadron, 6th South African Armoured Car Regiment
- Braforce (Brig. Medley)
  - 2nd South African Infantry Brigade (Note: This brigade was attached to the 1st South African Division after the loss of the 5th Infantry Brigade at Sidi-Rezegh.) (Brig. W. H. E. Poole CB CBE DSO KStJ LOM (USA))
  - 4th South African Infantry Brigade (less one battalion) (Brig. A.A. Hayton VD DSO)
  - 4th Field Regiment, S A Artillery
  - One Battery, 5th Field Regiment, S A Artillery
  - One Troop, 67th Medium Regiment, Royal Artillery
  - One Troop, 68th Medium Regiment, Royal Artillery
  - C and D Companies, Die Middellandse Regiment
- 3rd South African Infantry Brigade (Brig. C. E. Borain DSO MC VD ED):
  - Imperial Light Horse
  - 1st Royal Durban Light Infantry
  - Rand Light Infantry
  - 5th Field Regiment, S A Artillery (less one battery)
- 6th South African Infantry Brigade (Brig. F. W. Cooper DSO):
  - 2nd Transvaal Scottish
  - 1st South African Police Battalion
  - 2nd South African Police Battalion
  - 1st Field Regiment, Cape Field Artillery
- Railhead Force (Lt. Col. G. E. L. L'Estrange DSO VD):
  - Umvoti Mounted Rifles
  - Die Middellandse Regiment
  - Detachment TDS (approx 30 "I" Tanks (Note: Infantry support tanks))
  - 10th Field Company, South African Engineering Corps
- 5th New Zealand Infantry Brigade Group

=== Order of battle: The Fall of Tobruk ===
Order of Battle as at 20 June 1942

- Division troops
  - Die Middellandse Regiment (Machine-gun battalion)
  - 7th South African Reconnaissance Battalion
  - 2nd Field Regiment, Natal Field Artillery, South African Artillery
  - 3rd Field Regiment, Transvaal Horse Artillery, South African Artillery
  - 6th Anti-Tank Battery, South African Artillery
  - 2nd Light Anti-aircraft Regiment, South African Artillery
  - 2nd Battery, Cape Field Artillery (composed of men from Umtata, Transkei)
  - 4th and 10th South African Field Companies, S A Engineers
- 4th South African Infantry Brigade
  - 2nd Royal Durban Light Infantry
  - Umvoti Mounted Rifles
  - Kaffrarian Rifles
  - Blake Group (a composite battalion ex 1 SA Div)
- 6th South African Infantry Brigade
  - 1st South African Police Battalion
  - 2nd South African Police Battalion
  - 2nd Transvaal Scottish Regiment

== Theatres of operation ==
The theatres that the division served in were as follows:

- South Africa: 23 October 1940 to 20 April 1941
- At Sea: 20 April 1941 to 6 June 1941
- Egypt: 6 June 1941 to 22 March 1942
- Libya: 22 March 1942 to 21 June 1942

== Battles, actions and engagements ==
The division took part in the following battles, actions and engagements:

- Bardia: 31 December 1941 to 2 January 1942. Some 8,000 Allied prisoners of war were freed and some 6,000 Axis prisoners were taken.
- Clayden's Trench (Sollum): 11 January 1942 to 12 January 1942
- Gazala: 26 May 1942 to 21 June 1942
- Tobruk: 20 June 1942 to 21 June 1942. The number of South African prisoners taken at Tobruk has been recorded as 10,772

== Bibliography ==
- Liddell Hart, B.H., ed. (1982). The Rommel Papers (Reprint ed.). Hachette Books. ISBN 978-0-306-80157-0.
