= 4th Infantry Brigade (South Africa) =

- Active: 1940–1942
- Country: South Africa
- Allegiance: South Africa
- Part of: Brigade
- Garrison/HQ: Bloemfontein

The 4th South African Infantry Brigade was an infantry brigade of the army of the Union of South Africa during World War II. The Brigade formed part of the South African 2nd Infantry Division. The brigade served in the Western Desert Campaign until it was captured by German and Italian forces at Tobruk on 21 June 1942.

It appears to have been formed within the Orange Free State Command, as it was within the command boundaries on 3 September 1939. On that day it comprised Regiment President Steyn, Regiment Louw Wepener, Regiment De Wet, and 4 Field Company SAEC).

== Order of battle ==
Order of Battle as at 20 June 1942

- 2nd Royal Durban Light Infantry
- Umvoti Mounted Rifles
- The Kaffrarian Rifles

== Bibliography ==
- Agar-Hamilton, J.A.I. & Turner, L.F.C. Crisis in the Desert: May - July 1942. 1952, Oxford University Press, Cape Town.
