= Alexander Alfred Hayton =

Brigadier Alexander Alfred Hayton VD DSO
- Born: 1894; Chorlton, Lancashire, England
- Died: 1977 (aged 82–83); Johannesburg, Transvaal, South Africa
- Military career
- Allegiance: Republic of South Africa
- Branch: South African Army
- Rank: Brigadier
- Commands: 4th South African Brigade
- Conflicts: Western Desert Campaign
- Awards: Colonial Auxiliary Forces Officers' Decoration VD Distinguished Service Order DSO
- Other work: Chief Traffic Officer

Brigadier Alexander Alfred Hayton VD DSO (1894 – 1977 (aged 82–83) ) was a South African officer. During World War I he served as a lieutenant in the East African Campaign and in Egypt. He was the commanding officer of the 4th South African Brigade in the Western Desert Campaign in North Africa during World War II. In civilian life he worked as Chief Traffic Officer in Johannesburg.

== Awards and decorations ==
- Colonial Auxiliary Forces Officers' Decoration (VD)
- Distinguished Service Order (DSO)
