= 7 Medium Artillery Regiment =

7 Medium Regiment
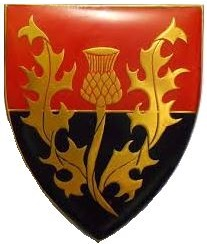
- 7 Medium Regiment emblem
- Active: 1939 to 1991
- Country: South Africa
- Allegiance: Republic of South Africa
- Branch: South African Army
- Type: Regular artillery
- Role: Medium Artillery
- Size: Regiment
- Part of: South African Army Artillery Corps; Army Conventional
- Garrison/HQ: Pretoria, Benoni
- Patron: St Barbara
- Motto: "Vox pulveris maxima est" (The voice of the greatest power)
- Engagements: World War II; South African Border War
- Battle honours: South-West Africa

Commanders
- OC 1946: Commandant A.H. Guy
- OC 1974: Commandant J.E. Coetzee
- OC 1979: Commandant K.W.J. Ward
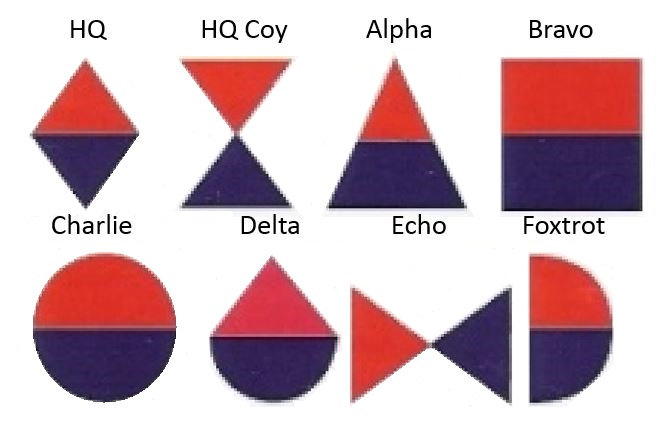
- Artillery Battery Emblems

- Artillery Beret Bar circa 1992

7 Medium Regiment was based in Benoni, South Africa, and was responsible for the training of soldiers allotted to Field and Medium Artillery.

== History ==
=== The original 7 Medium Regiment ===
Formed on 16 September 1939, this regiment served in East and North Africa, but later merged with the 23rd medium regiment and was then referred as the 7/23rd Medium Regiment and served with the 6th Armoured Division (South Africa) in Italy.

=== Transvaal Scottish influence ===
In July 1946, the first intake of post war recruits into the 3rd Battalion Transvaal Scottish Regiment were reformed as the 7th Medium Regiment SAA (3 t.s.) with its headquarters in Benoni. The first officer commanding was Commandant A.H. Guy. The members continued to wear Transvaal Scottish buttons and shoulder titles but now wore artillery cap badges and collar badges. The regiment was equipped with two eight-gun batteries of 5.5 inch guns. This 7 Medium Regiment was disbanded on 28 February 1960.

=== Rebirth of 7 Medium Regiment ===
With the reorganization of the Artillery Corps in 1974, it was decided to once again establish a medium regiment and this became the 7 Medium Regiment SAA (fd), a Citizen Force unit with its headquarters once again in Benoni. Amongst others this new unit comprised members from Regiment Laeveld (previously known as 2nd Medium Regiment) from Nelspruit, which formed the nucleus of the ranks when it was the 7th Field Regiment based in Pretoria under command of Commandant J.E. Coetzee.

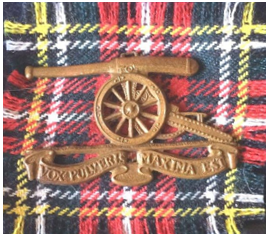
SADF 7 Medium Artillery Regiment SAA beret badge and backing

=== Operations ===
The regiment saw action during several operational tours of the Border War. It also had the unique distinction of being the first artillery unit to fire live rounds at the new Army Battle School range at Lohatla during September 1978. During 1979 it fell under the command of Commandant K.W.J. Ward and had an effective officer's strength of 37 with a complement of warrant officers and 650 other ranks. The regiment's three batteries were referred to as 71, 72 and 73 in line with the modern practice of naming batteries after the unit's number. At this stage the regiment fell under the command of 7 South African Infantry Division.

=== Freedom of the City ===
7 Medium Regiment received the Freedom of Benoni in August 1981. An artillery flag was draped over the breech of each gun. This then became standard practice when their guns were on ceremonial parade.

=== Dress Insignia ===
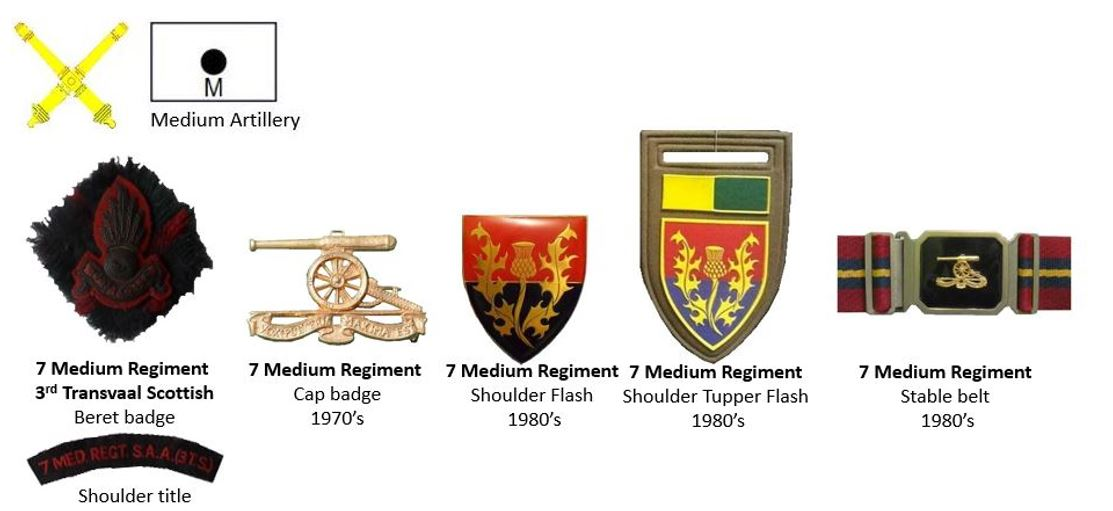
SADF era 7 Medium Regiment insignia

=== Amalgamation ===
During the reorganization of the army in 1991, the Transvaal Horse Artillery absorbed 7 Medium Regiment and 2 Locating Regiment.
