= 6th Infantry Brigade (South Africa) =

- Active: 1940–1942
- Country: South Africa
- Allegiance: South Africa
- Type: Brigade
- Nickname: The Police Brigade

Commanders
- Notable commanders: Brigadier Frederick William Cooper

The 6th South African Infantry Brigade was an infantry brigade of the army of the Union of South Africa during World War II.
The Brigade formed part of the South African 2nd Infantry Division. The brigade served in the Western Desert Campaign until it was captured by German and Italian forces at Tobruk on 21 June 1942.

== History ==
The Brigade was formed on 17 June 1940 at Pietermaritzburg. It comprised two infantry battalions formed in early 1940 from the South African Police : the 1st and 2nd South African Police battalions, and also the 2nd Transvaal Scottish battalion based at Johannesburg. It was commanded throughout its existence by Brigadier Frederick William Cooper.

It became part of the South African 2nd Infantry Division on 5 November 1940, and arrived in Egypt on 6 June 1941. It participated in the successful Operation Crusader and recaptured Bardia, Sallum and the Halfaya Pass in January 1942.

In June 1942, the Brigade was part of the garrison of Tobruk, and went into captivity after the Axis capture of Tobruk on 21 June 1942. It wasn't reformed after this.

== Order of battle ==
Order of Battle as at 21 June 1942 (surrender at Tobruk)

- 2nd Transvaal Scottish
- 1st South African Police
- 2nd South African Police

== Bibliography ==
- Cooper, Brigadier Frederick William. The Police Brigade: 6th S.A. Infantry Brigade 1939 - 1945. 1972, Constantia Publishers.
- Agar-Hamilton, J.A.I. & Turner, L.F.C. Crisis in the Desert: May - July 1942. 1952, Oxford University Press, Cape Town.
