= 3rd Infantry Brigade (South Africa) =

3rd South African Infantry Brigade
- Active: 13 Aug 1940 – 1 Jan 1943
- Disbanded: 1 January 1943
- Country: South Africa
- Allegiance: Union of South Africa
- Branch: South African Army
- Type: Infantry
- Size: Brigade

Commanders
- Commander October 1942: Brig. R.J. Palmer

The 3rd South African Infantry Brigade was an infantry brigade of the army of the Union of South Africa during World War II. The Brigade formed part of the South African 1st Infantry Division and was formed on 13 August 1940. It served in the Western Desert and was disbanded on 1 January 1943.

During the Western Desert Campaign (at the time of the Second Battle of El Alamein), the Officer Commanding was Brig. R.J. Palmer and the brigade comprised the following units:

- 3rd South African Infantry Brigade
  - 1st Imperial Light Horse SA Infantry Corps
  - 1st Rand Light Infantry SA Infantry Corps
  - 1st Royal Durban Light Infantry SA Infantry Corps
  - One Troop 3rd Light Anti-Aircraft Battery SA Artillery Corps
  - 2nd Field Company SA Engineering Corps

== Bibliography ==
- Orpen, N. War in the Desert: South African Forces World War II: Volume III. 1971, Purnell, Cape Town.
