= Solomon Mahlangu Regiment =

Transvaal Scottish Volunteers Transvaal Scottish Transvaal Scottish Regiment
- SANDF Transvaal Scottish emblem
- Active: 1902 to present
- Country: South Africa
- Allegiance: Republic of South Africa; Union of South Africa (formerly)
- Branch: South African Army; South African Defence Force (formerly)
- Type: Line infantry
- Role: Motorised infantry
- Size: One battalion
- Part of: South African Infantry Formation; Army Conventional Reserve
- Garrison/HQ: The View, Parktown Johannesburg
- Mottos: Alba nam Buadh (Scotland, Home of the Virtues)
- March: The Atholl Highlanders

Insignia
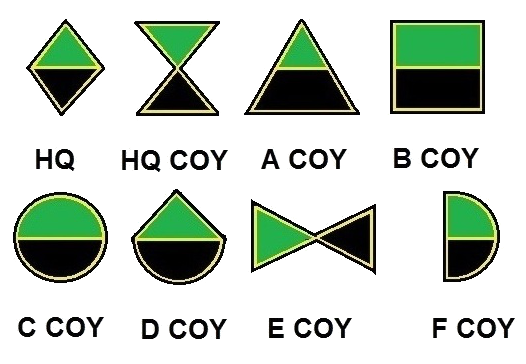
- Company level Insignia

- SA Motorised Infantry beret bar circa 1992: SA Motorised Infantry beret bar
- Abbreviation: SMR

The Solomon Mahlangu Regiment (formerly the Transvaal Scottish) is a reserve infantry regiment of the South African Army.

== History ==
=== Origin ===
John Murray, Marquis of Tullibardine, who later became the 7th Duke of Atholl, established the regiment after the conclusion of the Second Anglo-Boer War in 1902. Its initial membership consisted of volunteers from Scottish units that had fought in the war who chose to demobilise and remain in the colony. The new unit wore his family tartan and took the form of an oversized battalion with companies in a number of major Transvaal towns.

=== Bambatha Rebellion ===
The unit first saw service during the Bambatha Rebellion. "C" company of the Natal Rangers was recruited from men of the Transvaal Scottish (then called the Transvaal Scottish Volunteers).

=== Maritz Rebellion ===
In 1914 during the Maritz Rebellion, when men who supported the recreation of a Boer South African Republic rose up against the newly created government of the Union of South Africa, the Regiment was called up once again and saw action suffering one casualty.

=== First World War ===
==== German South West Africa ====
After the official outbreak of the First World War the Transvaal Scottish took part in the invasion of German South West Africa as part of the South-West Africa Campaign in late 1914 with a second battalion (2nd Transvaal Scottish) being raised for the campaign.

Their most serious encounter with German Forces took place near Trekkoppies when a superior German Force attacked 2nd Battalion. They suffered their first casualties of the war with 2 killed and 13 wounded. After the conquest of German South West Africa the 2nd Battalion was disbanded, while 1 Transvaal Scottish spent the remainder of the war in reserve.

==== Western Front ====
To join British Imperial Forces for the war in Europe, 4th South African Infantry Regiment was raised (also known as the South African Scottish) because the 1912 Defence Act restricted the Active Citizen Force from operating outside of South Africa. This was a kilted unit wearing the Murray of Atholl tartan and two companies were drawn from members of the Transvaal Scottish.

After a short campaign in North Africa against a Turkish attack on the Suez Canal in 1915, the SA Scottish were sent to France. Here they took part in the Battle of Delville Wood as part of the Battle of the Somme in 1916. In the days between 15 July and 19 July the total casualty rate was at 74 percent of those who had gone into action. By the end of July the South African Scottish suffered 868 casualties. The final German forces were driven from Delville Wood after an Allied assault on 3 September 1916. After Delville Wood the shattered SA Scottish were reformed and served on the Western front, in particular at Vimy Ridge, the Somme, the Battle of Passchendaele, Marrieres Wood and the Battle of Messines. During its time on the Western Front, the South African Brigade and its Scottish heritage 4th Battalion, first served a lengthy stint with the British 9th (Scottish) Division, and following the Brigade's decimation in March 1918, was reconstituted and incorporated in September into the 66th (2nd East Lancashire) Division until the end of the war.

==== East African Campaign ====
Other members of the Transvaal Scottish saw service in the Scottish company of the 9th SA Infantry ACF in the East African Campaign. After the conclusion of hostilities at the end of the First World War, members of the regiment returned home and after demobilisation continued with their civilian lives.

=== Inter-war Period ===
The Transvaal Scottish were once again called up in 1922 to help maintain law and order and quell the armed uprising of miners during the Rand Rebellion. In one encounter near Boksburg 12 members of the regiment, including an officer, were killed. The regiment along with the Witwatersrand Rifles and the Royal Durban Light Infantry, cleared Fordsburg of the last rebels on 14 March 1922. By the end of the revolt another 5 had lost their lives and 60 had been wounded.

=== Second World War ===
In 1936, 2 Battalion was raised once again in anticipation of the Second World War and when war finally broke out in 1939 a third battalion was formed.

The 1st Transvaal Scottish took part in the Allied offensive during the East African Campaign in order to take Italian East Africa (modern day Ethiopia and parts of Somalia). They engaged Italian forces in several engagement in Addis Ababa, Combolcia, Dessie and finally at their mountain fortress at Amba Alagi. The battalion was next sent to Egypt, to take part in the relief of Tobruk. In November 1941 the 1st Brigade, with which 1 Transvaal Scottish was serving, was attacked by a strong German force at Taib-el-Essemand, but successfully repulsed the attack.

In 1942 in the Battle of Gazala the 1st battalion defended against several attacks on the Gazala Line before joining the Eighth Army's retreat to the Alamein Line in Egypt, although a portion of the battalion was trapped and taken prisoner at Tobruk in June 1942. 1 Transvaal Scottish now joined the British Eight Army in the Second Battle of El Alamein where they halted the German assault on Egypt. Early in 1943 the battalion returned home to South Africa. There the unit was converted to armour, joining 1st SA Armoured Brigade.

In North Africa the 2nd Transvaal Scottish, together with two battalions consisting of members of the South African Police, served in the 6th South African Infantry Brigade. They assisted in the construction of the famous "Alamein Box". 6th South African Infantry Brigade attacked the fortified town of Sollum on 11 January 1942 as part of Operation Battleaxe and went on to fight in the battles of Bardia, Acroma Keep and Gazala. At Bardia, Sollum and Halfaya both German and Italian troops were forced to surrender to the Brigade. The majority of the battalion, along with the entire South African 2nd Division, was captured when the "fortress" of Tobruk fell at the end of the Battle of Gazala.

3rd Transvaal Scottish took part in the East African Campaign in Ethiopia, in particular the three-day attack on Mega, Ethiopia. After this the battalion was sent to Egypt to take part in Operation Crusader, where it suffered heavy losses at the battle of Sidi Rezegh in November 1941. After Sidi Rezegh, 3rd Transvaal Scottish was temporarily disbanded. Over two hundred men from the Transvaal Scottish died in World War 2.

Members of 3rd Transvaal Scottish who were captured in North Africa were shipped to occupied Europe. Some were on the merchant ship Sebastiano Veniero when the Royal Navy submarine HMS Porpoise sank her off the Greek coast in December 1941. Sebastiano Veniero's crew beached the ship at Methoni in the Peloponnese, where many of the PoWs took their chances to swim ashore. A 3rd Transvaal Scottish lance corporal, Bernard Friedlander, swam ashore with a rope, which took him 90 minutes. The rope was then used to haul a cable ashore, which was made fast on land and used by nearly 1,600 survivors to reach safety. In July 1945 Friedlander was awarded the George Medal. In 1947 King George VI toured South Africa, and at a ceremony in Johannesburg on 31 March personally decorated Friedlander with the medal.

=== Post-war 1945-1974 ===
All three battalions were reconstituted in 1946, with the 3rd battalion being converted to artillery as 7th Medium Regiment (3TS). This unit was disbanded in 1959 and many members were transferred back to the Transvaal Scottish. Earlier, in 1953, the 1st and 2nd battalions had been amalgamated, although in 1971 the 2nd Battalion Transvaal Scottish was once again revived.

=== South African Border War ===
After the Portuguese withdrew from Angola in 1975, Civil War broke out in the country and 1st Battalion Transvaal Scottish were deployed in southern Angola from South-West Africa. Later in the same year the 2nd Battalion deployed to the Caprivi Strip where they would eventually help develop a form of highly mobile counter-insurgency operations (COIN-ops) using Mine Protected Vehicles throughout the war.

In 1983, Company Sergeant-Major Trevor ("Porky") Wright was awarded the Honoris Crux after he distinguished himself when his isolated company base in north-western South-West Africa was attacked by heavily armed guerilla fighters. Wright personally firing a machine gun from the hip at one point and supervised ammunition replenishment throughout the course of the enemy attack. (A number of other members of the Company were awarded the CSADF medal for their brave and heroic actions, now known as the Military Merit Medal. One of these members 2lt Lance Houghton went on to command the 2 Battalion in 1992). Another event CSM Wright was involved in, occurred two years prior to the attack, was also brought into consideration for the commendation. Wright noticed a primed hand grenade which had been accidentally lobbed near his fellow troops during training and risked certain death when he picked up and hurled the grenade away. In 1984 a company led by Captain George Brownlow from 2 Transvaal Scottish achieved notable successes with the capture of two insurgents. Captain Brownlow was later awarded Southern Cross Medal. In the 1980s 2 Transvaal Scottish became the first Citizen Force unit to deploy on the borders with Botswana and Zimbabwe.

The Transvaal Scottish was assigned to command of 72 Brigade in this era.

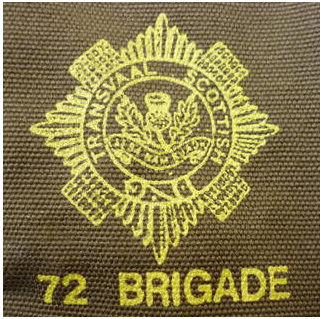
SADF era Cap detail 72 Brigade Transvaal Scottish

=== The 1990s ===
Later in the early 1990s, when the negotiations to end apartheid in South Africa were taking place, 1st and 2nd Transvaal Scottish were assigned internal stability roles in townships where unrest and violence broke out.

The regiment's last major service was to remain on standby throughout the country's first fully democratic elections on 27 April 1994. The Transvaal Scottish had helped assure the peaceful transition to democracy, and with it, signalled their own willingness to build a new South Africa. During 1997 as a result of the rationalisation measures within the South African National Defence Force the 1st and 2nd Battalions of the Regiment were once again amalgamated.

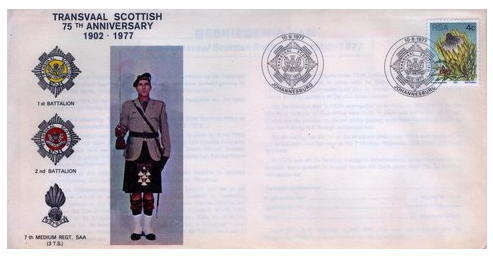
SADF Transvaal Scottish Regiment 75 anniversary commemorative letter

In 1995 a 44-strong Transvaal Scottish party visited the battlefields of the Somme in France, their former Colonel-in-Chief, Queen Elizabeth the Queen Mother, their allied regiment The Black Watch as well as the Atholl Highlanders and their clan chief, Iain Murray, 10th Duke of Atholl, at Blair Castle in Scotland. In the party was Lt. Bruce Murray and his brother, Cpl. Lord Murray, both relatives of the Duke of Atholl.

=== The 21st Century ===
On 4 August 2000, a regimental colour party took part in a parade in London to celebrate the one hundredth birthday of Queen Elizabeth the Queen Mother and in 2002 representatives of the regiment returned to London for the funeral of their former Colonel-in-Chief. In 2002 the Regiment celebrated 100 years of service with a colour parade at King Edward VII School in Houghton, Johannesburg.

Since 2007 members of the Regiment have taken an active part in United Nations peace keeping operations in Burundi and the Democratic Republic of Congo.

"A" company of the Transvaal Scottish was deployed in 2010 to take part in the United Nations Mission in Sudan, while "B" Company was deployed to defend the country's borders.

The Regimental headquarters are now in The View, Parktown, originally the house of Sir Thomas Cullinan.

==== Name Change ====
In August 2019, 52 Reserve Force units had their names changed to reflect what the South African government says are "the military traditions and history of indigenous African military formations and the liberation armies involved in the freedom struggle". The Transvaal Scottish became the Solomon Mahlangu Regiment, and have 3 years to design and implement new regimental insignia. There has been some controversy about this specific change of name, with critics citing the fact that the TRC found him to have been guilty of Gross Human Rights Abuses.

== Regimental symbols ==
- The regimental tartan is the "Murray of Atholl", except for the pipers who wear the "Murray of Tullibardine". Both tartans symbolise the regiment's connections to the Dukes of Atholl, and thus to the Atholl Highlanders. Since 1938, members have worn the red hackle on their khaki tam o'shanter as a symbol of the regiment's connection with the famous Black Watch Regiment. As part of their formal uniforms, officers and Warrant Officers Class I of the regiment carry Basket-hilted claymores instead of the more typical swords.
- The regimental badge depicts a Scottish thistle on a scroll bearing the motto Alba nam Buadh (Gaelic for "Well done, Scotland" or "Scotland, home of the virtues"). It is surrounded by a heraldic strap and buckle bearing the regiment's name, all on the Star of the Order of the Thistle.
- The regimental March is the "Atholl Highlanders".

=== Previous Dress Insignia ===
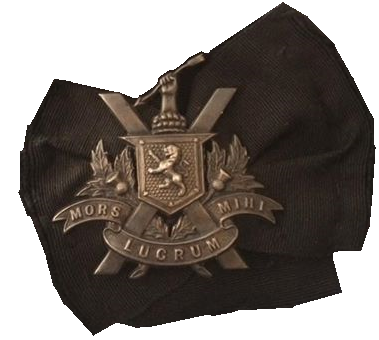
UDF era WW1 South African Scottish or 4th Infantry Regiment beret badge

During WW1 the Union Defence Force established the 4th Infantry Regiment which was unique in that it was the South African Scottish, raised from the Transvaal Scottish and the Cape Town Highlanders, and wearing the Atholl Murray tartan. This regiment's collar badges were identical to those of the Cape Town Highlanders but bore the Latin motto "Mors Lucrum Mihi" (Death is my reward) in place of the usual Cape Town Highlander wording. (Death is my Reward), was the family motto of the first Officer Commanding SA Scottish, a Lieutenant-Colonel F.A. Jones.

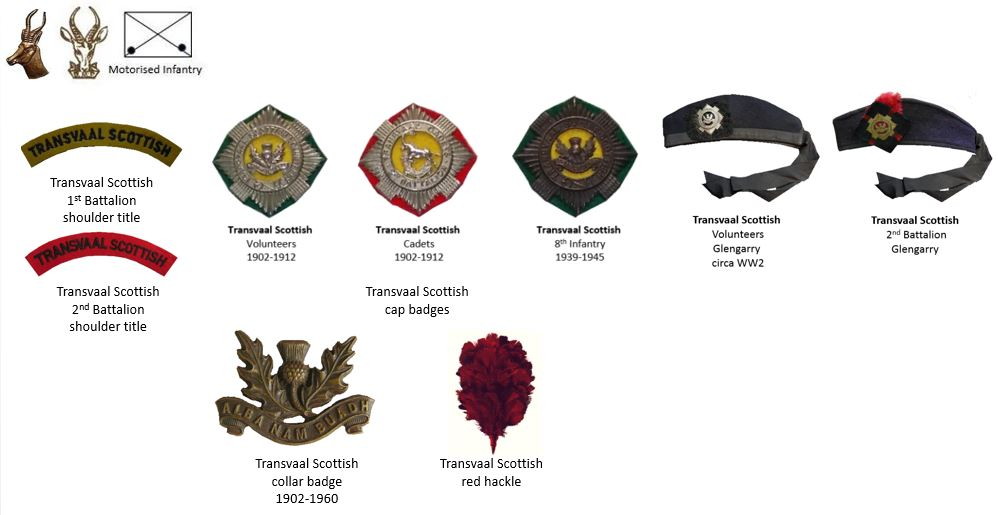
UDF and SADF era Transvaal Scottish insignia

=== Current Dress Insignia ===
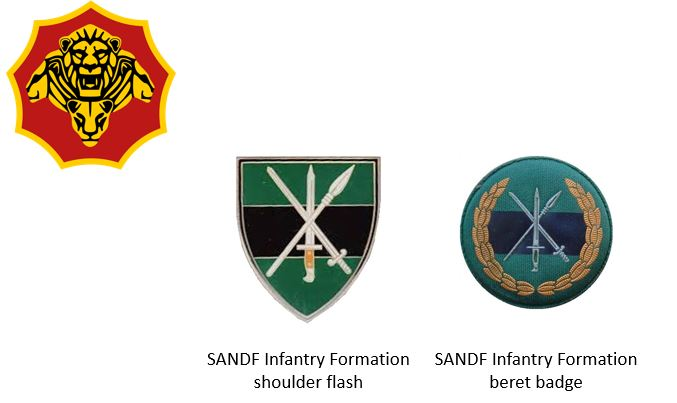
SANDF era Infantry Formation insignia

== Alliances ==
- United Kingdom - Black Watch
- Scotland - The Atholl Highlanders
- United Kingdom - Fife and Forfar Yeomanry/Scottish Horse

== Sister regiments ==
3 Battalion Transvaal Scottish was converted to 7 Medium Artillery Regiment and garrisoned in Benoni.

== Battle honours ==
The Transvaal Scottish has the following battle honours on its regimental colours:

- Natal 1906
- South West Africa, 1914-1915
- East Africa (As part of the 1st Infantry Division and then later, as part of the independent 1st South African Infantry Brigade) 1940 - 1941
  - El Wak
  - The Juba
  - Yonte
  - Diredawa
  - Combolcia
  - Amba Alagi
- Western Desert (As part of the 1st Infantry Division) 1941-1943
  - Sollum
  - Sidi Rezegh
  - Gazala
  - Alem Hamza
  - Acroma Keep
  - Alamein Defence
  - Mega
  - El Alamein

Battle Honours
Battle Honours awarded to the Transvaal Scottish
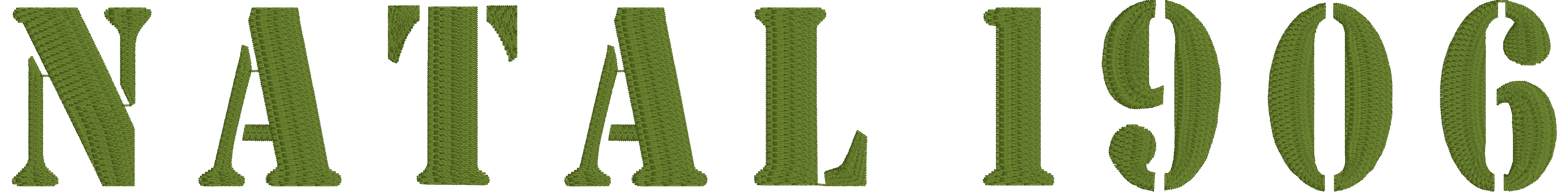
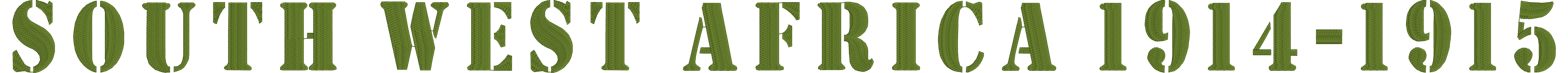
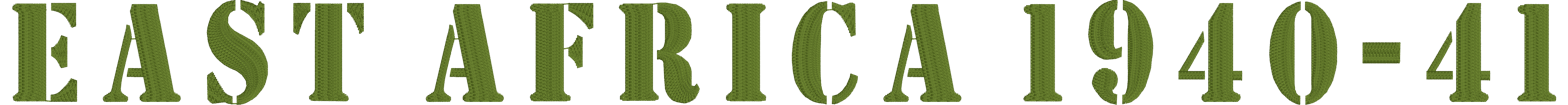
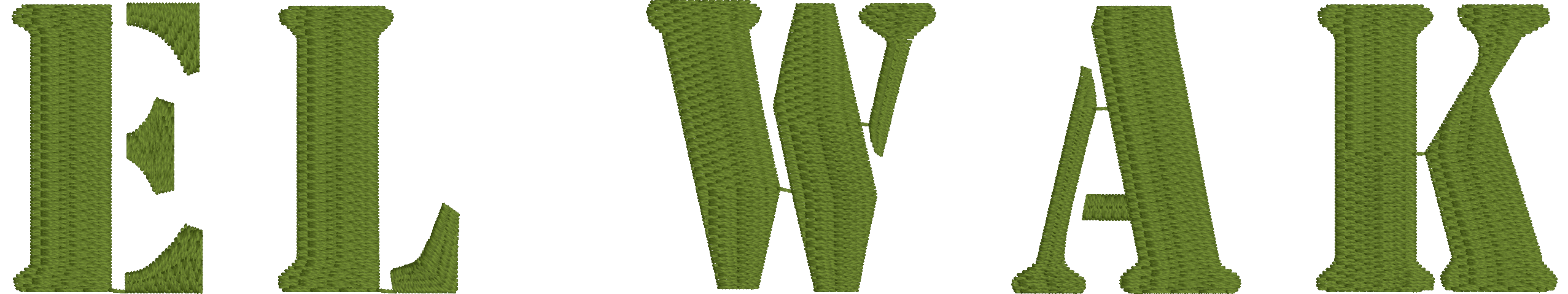
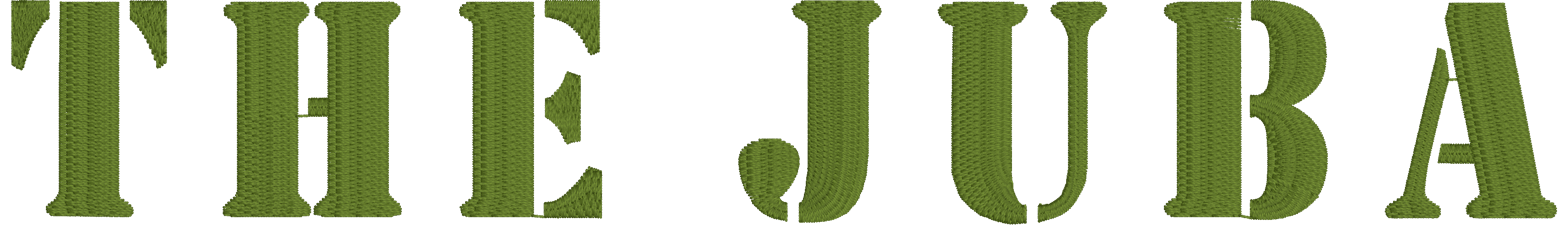
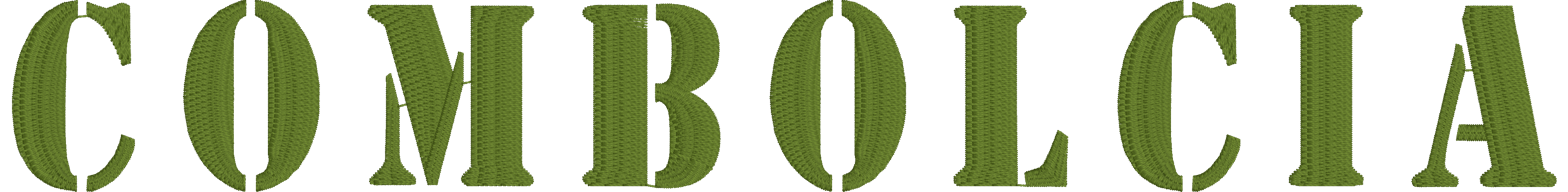
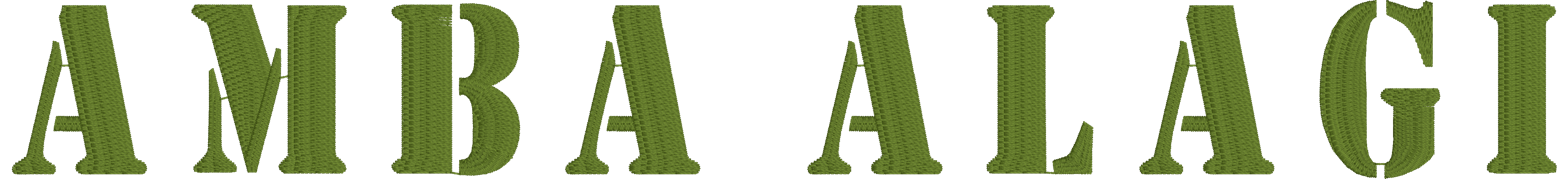
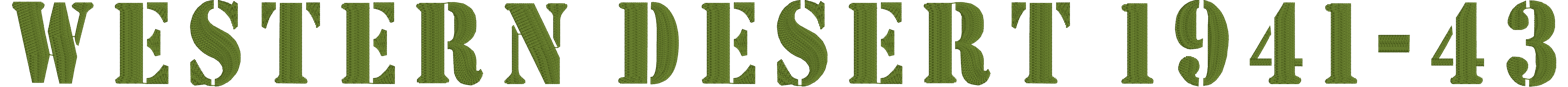
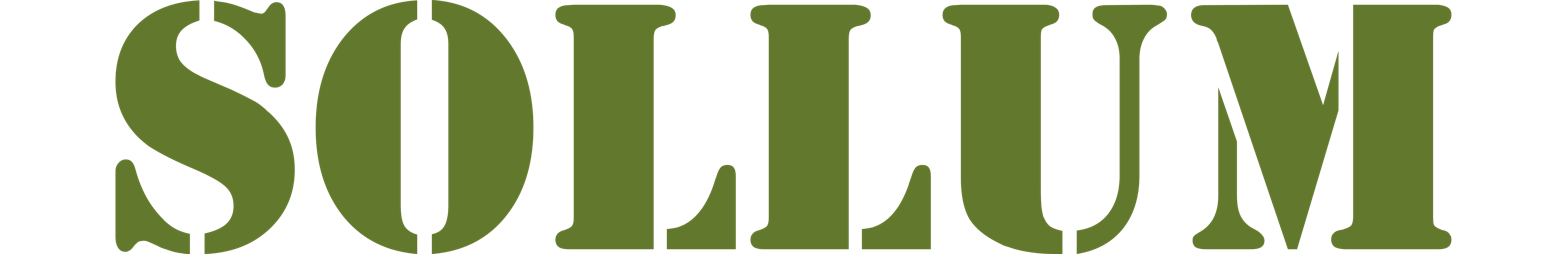
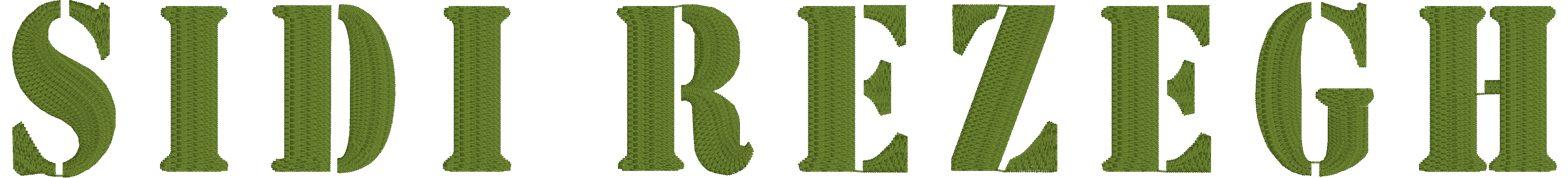
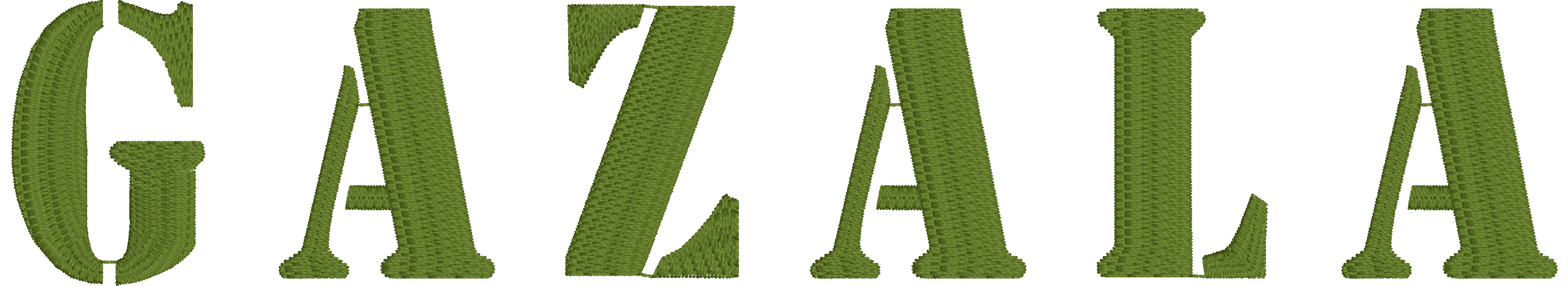
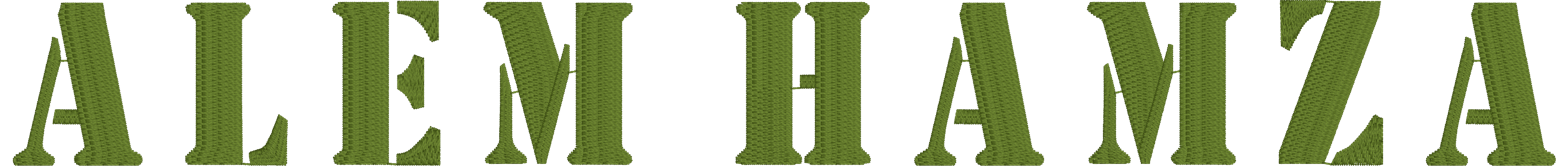
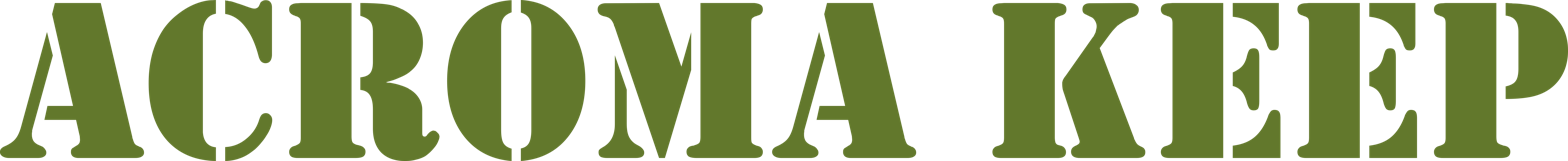
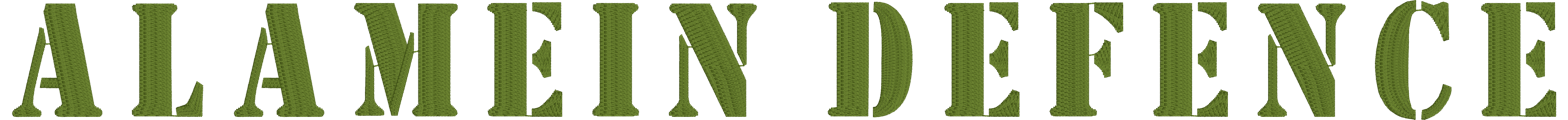
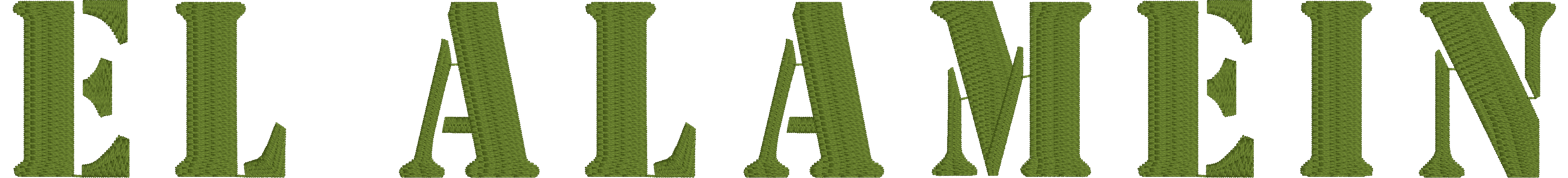

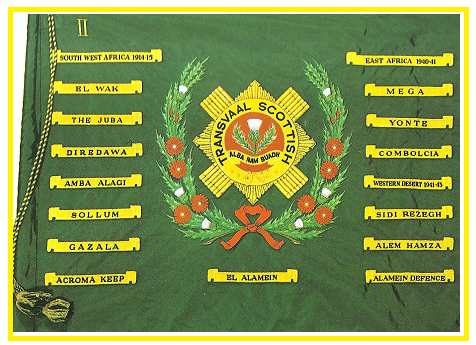
Transvaal Scottish 2nd Battalion Battle Honours

In addition, the regiment (along with the Cape Town Highlanders Regiment) still claims fifteen "missing" battle honours awarded for service in France and Flanders to the 4th South African Infantry (South African Scottish) battalion; these include some of the most famous in South Africa's military history: Egypt 1916, Somme 1916, Delville Wood, Arras 1917, Ypres 1917, Menin Road, Messines 1918, Hindenburg Line, Cambrai 1918, Pursuit to Mons, France and Flanders 1918, Le Transloy, Scarpe 1917, Kemmel, Lys

Battle Honours
Missing Awards
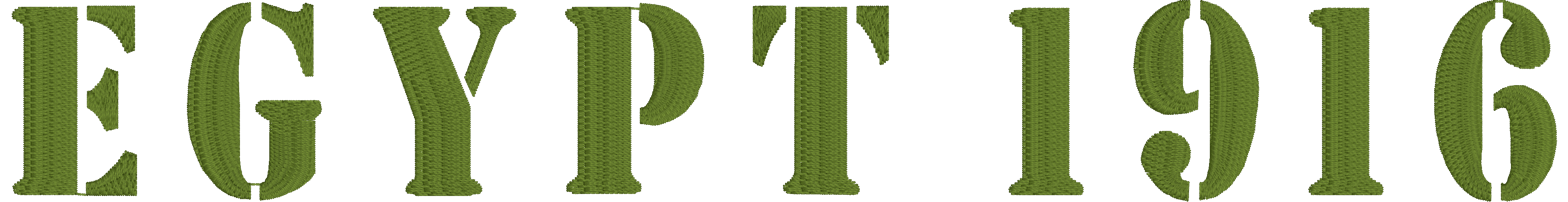
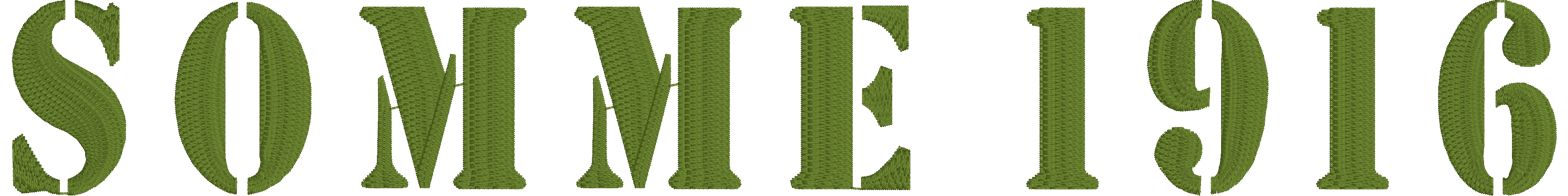
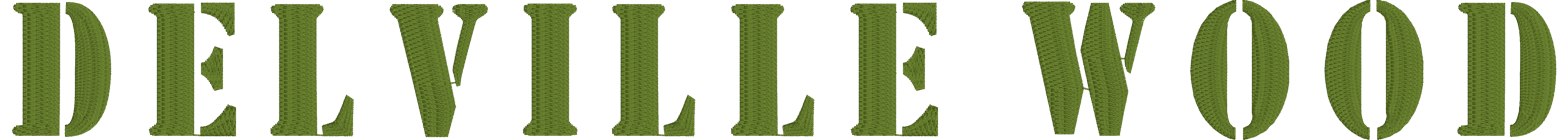
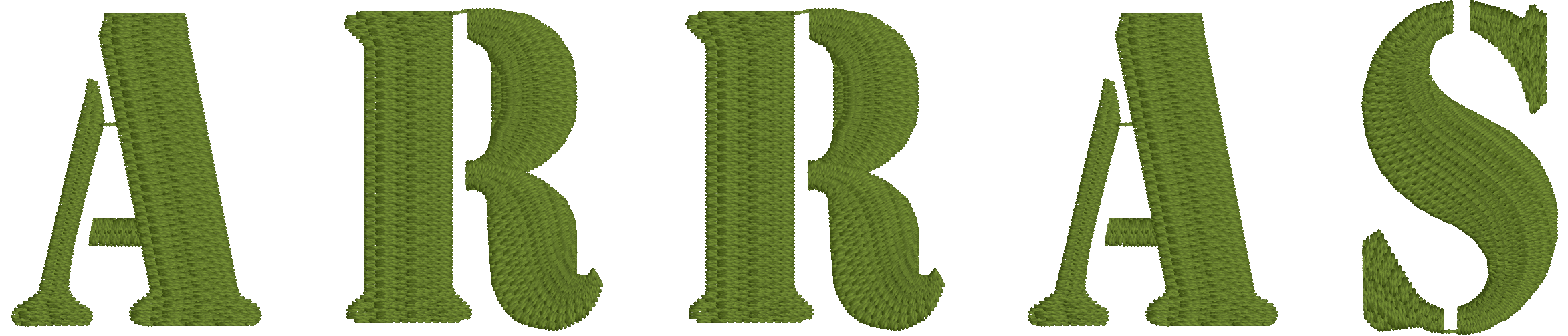
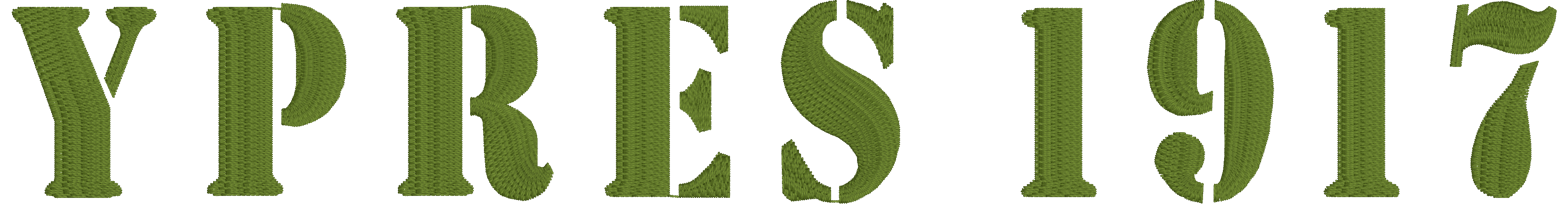
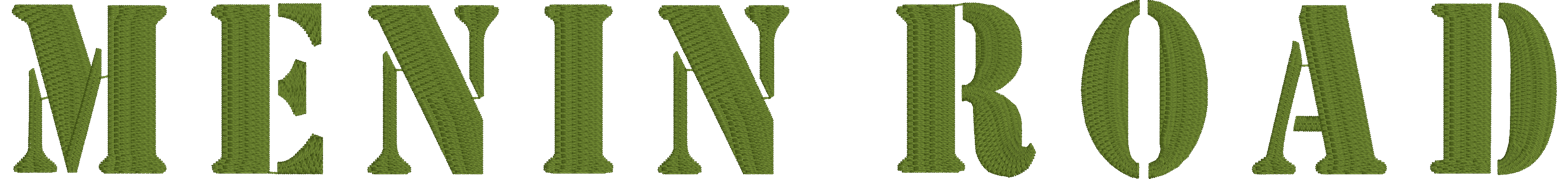
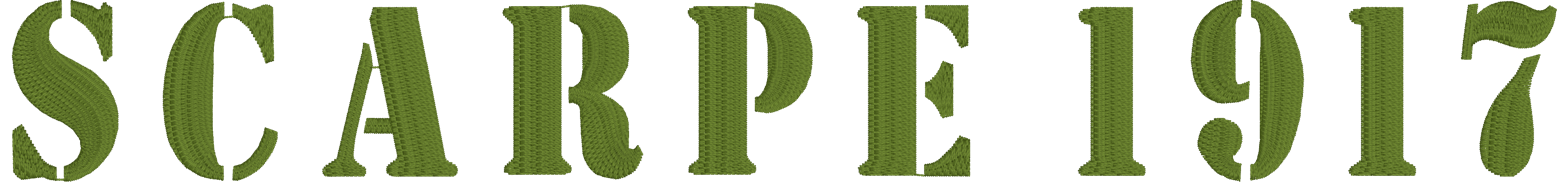

== Pipes & Drums ==
The regiment retains a pipes and drums, due to their Scottish heritage. Formed in 1902, the band is one of 3 South African Defence Force pipe bands, the other 2 being affiliated with the Andrew Mlangeni Regiment and the Gonnema Regiment (formerly the South African Irish and Cape Town Highlanders respectively). Besides attending military occasions on behalf of the regiment, the pipes & drums compete in grade 2, currently the highest competitive pipe band division in South Africa.

Fondly known as the 'Jocks', the Pipes and Drums have won the premier division of the South African Pipe Band Championships on numerous occasions since the bands inception and, recently, have won the South African Championships and Champion of Champions every year since 2018 (excluding 2020 and 2021 where competitions were cancelled due to restrictions imposed as a result of the Covid-19 pandemic). Many band members also compete in solo competition.

The drummers of the band wear the Murray of Atholl tartan, the Regimental tartan, whilst the pipers wear the Murray of Tullibardine tartan. The regimental march, the Atholl Highlanders, continues to be played as part of the band's repertoire and has become synonymous with the camaraderie the band exude. Traditionally, when the tune is heard, all Jocks (past and present) will stand to attention.

The Pipes and Drums are led by Pipe Major Craig Whitley and Leading Drummer Sabastian Cruz.

== Freedom of Entry ==
The unit exercised its freedom of entry into Johannesburg on 9 November 2013 as part of the centenary celebrations of the City of Johannesburg with bayonets fixed, colours flying and drums beating.

== Bibliography ==
- Mitchell, J.H. (1994). Tartan on the Veld - The Transvaal Scottish 1950-1993. Transvaal Scottish Regimental Council, Johannesburg.
