= Military history of South Africa during World War II =

During World War II, many South Africans saw military service. The Union of South Africa participated with other British Empire forces in battles in North Africa against Erwin Rommel and his Afrika Korps, and many South African pilots joined the Royal Air Force and fought against the Axis powers in the European theatre.

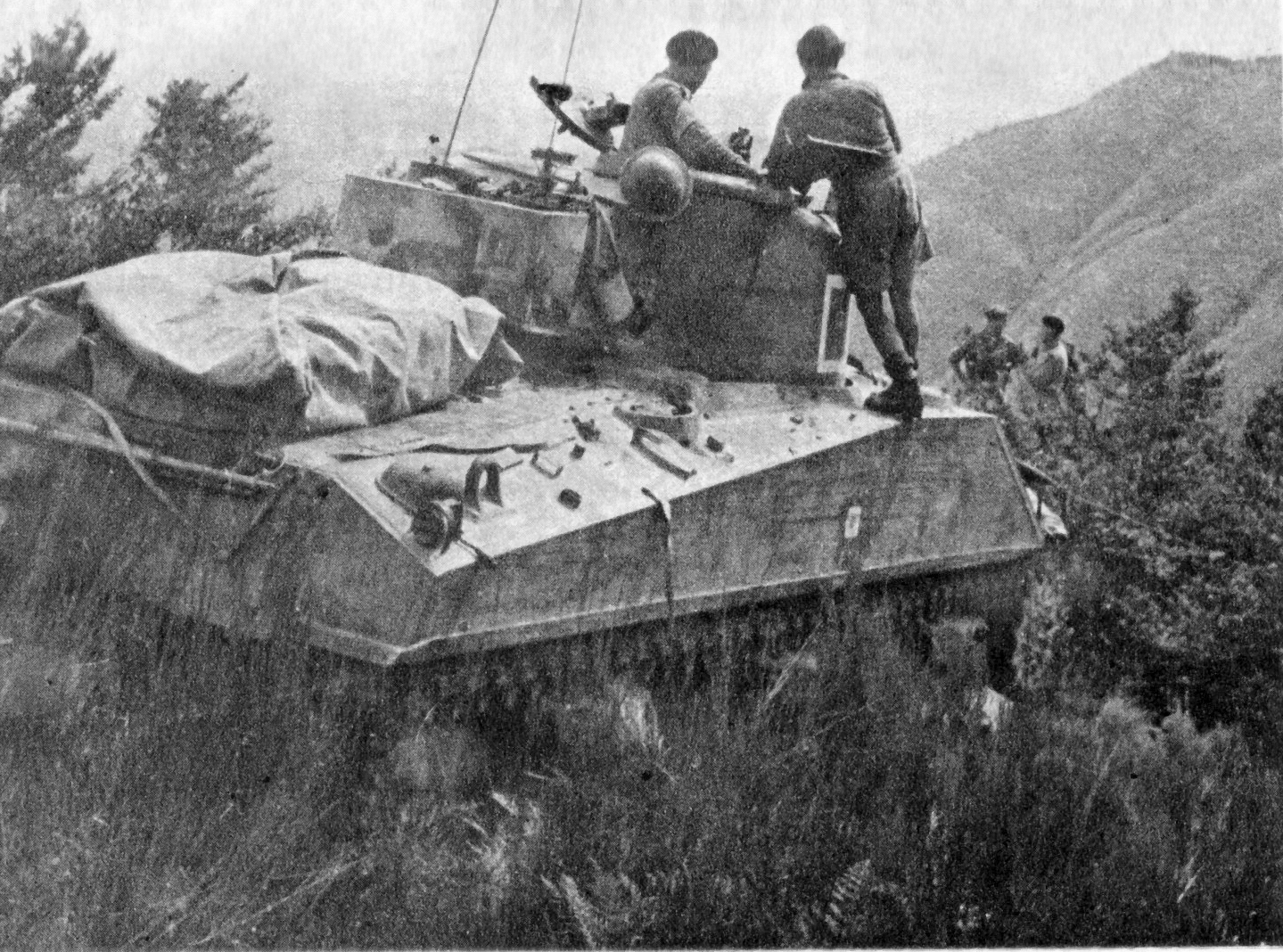
A Sherman tank from the South African 6th Armoured Division in 1944

== Political choices at outbreak of war ==
On the eve of World War II, the Union of South Africa found itself in a unique political and military quandary. While it was closely allied with the United Kingdom, being a co-equal Dominion under the 1931 Statute of Westminster with its head of state being the British king, the South African Prime Minister and head of government on 1 September 1939 was J.B.M. Hertzog – the leader of the pro-Afrikaner and anti-British National Party. The National Party had joined in a unity government with the pro-British South African Party of Jan Smuts in 1934 as the United Party.

After Adolf Hitler's forces attacked Poland on 1 September 1939, Britain declared war on Germany two days later. A short but furious debate unfolded in South Africa, especially in the Parliament of South Africa. It pitted those who sought to enter the war on Britain's side, led by Smuts, against those who wanted to keep South Africa neutral, led by Hertzog. Prior to the war, Afrikaner nationalist movements styled after German Nazism such as the Grey Shirts, the Ossewabrandwag, and Oswald Pirow's New Order had been popular in South Africa.

== Declaration of war against the Axis ==
On 4 September 1939, the United Party caucus refused to accept Hertzog's stance of neutrality in World War II and deposed him in favour of Smuts. Upon becoming prime minister, on 6 September Smuts declared South Africa officially at war with Germany and the Axis. Immediately, Smuts set about fortifying South Africa against any possible German sea invasion because of South Africa's global strategic importance controlling the long sea route around the Cape of Good Hope.

Future Prime Minister John Vorster, and other members of the pro-Nazi/anti-British Ossewabrandwag strongly objected to South Africa's participation in the war. In August 1940, the OB offered to launch an uprising against Jan Smuts. The organization said they had 160,000 members 15,000 soldiers, who had not taken the "Africa oath" of willingness to fight against the Axis anywhere on the continent, ready to strike. They proposed that the Germans drop off weapons in Southern Rhodesia or South West Africa. The "West Plan" was far more well-planned.

"At an hour to be determined by the German High Command, Afrikaners would then blow up all rail and road bridges connecting the Transvaal with Natal. The railway personnel, the Police and 26,000 mine workers and employees have been penetrated as the rest of the State services with Ossewabrandwag members and would go on strike. The latter, viz. mine workers and employees, are already today urging for a strike. English newspapers are going to be blown up. Smuts and his followers are going to be asked to kill themselves. Further dispositions are left to the German General Staff, particularly whether and which bridges are to be blown up."

The plan was never carried out since the OB was unable to obtain sufficient weapons. Furthermore, the OB was reluctant to take up arms after Malan distanced the National Party from the organization at the end of 1941. Nevertheless, individual members carried out acts of sabotage against the Union government. The Stormjaers dynamited electrical power lines and railroads and cut telegraph and telephone lines. These types of acts were going too far for most Afrikaners, and Malan ordered the National Party to break with the OB entirely in 1942. Smuts took severe action against the Ossewabrandwag movement and jailed its leaders, including Vorster, for the duration of the war.

== Field Marshal and Prime Minister Smuts ==
Field Marshal Jan Smuts was the only important non-British general whose advice was constantly sought by United Kingdom's war-time Prime Minister Winston Churchill. Smuts was invited to the Chamberlain war ministry in 1939 as the most senior South African in favour of war. On 28 May 1941, Smuts was appointed a Field Marshal of the British Army, becoming the first South African to hold that rank. Ultimately, Smuts would pay a steep political price for his closeness to the British establishment, to King George VI, and to Winston Churchill which had made Smuts very unpopular amongst the Afrikaners, leading to his eventual downfall, the rise of D.F Malan and the subsequent Apartheid government.

== Manpower ==
With the declaration of war in September 1939, the South African Army numbered only 5,353 regulars, with an additional 14,631 men of the Active Citizen Force (ACF) which gave peace time training to volunteers and in time of war would form the main body of the army. Pre-war plans did not anticipate that the army would fight outside southern Africa and it was trained and equipped only for bush warfare.

One of the problems to continuously face South Africa during the war was the shortage of available men. Due to its race policies it would only consider arming men of European descent which limited the available pool of men aged between 20 and 40 to around 320,000. In addition the declaration of war on Germany had the support of only a narrow majority in the South African parliament and was far from universally popular. Indeed, there was a significant minority actively opposed to the war and under these conditions conscription was never an option. The expansion of the army and its deployment overseas depended entirely on volunteers.

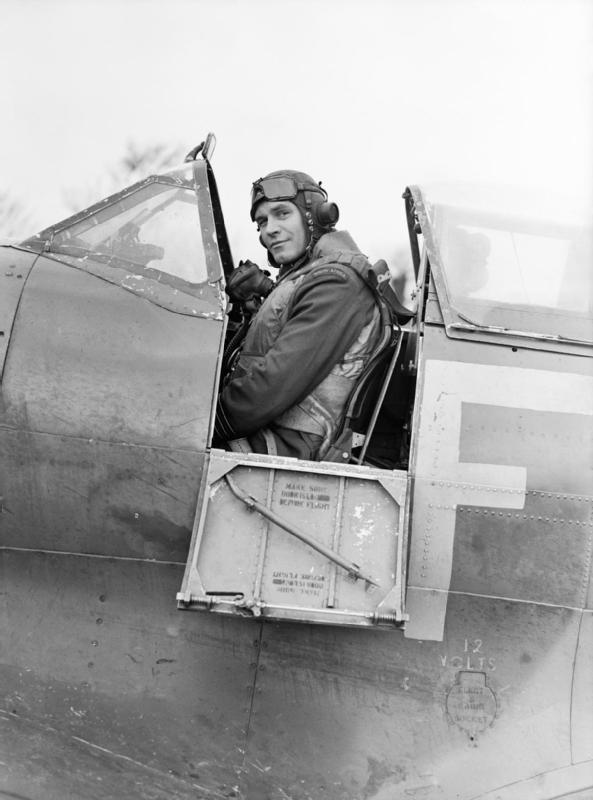
South African pilot Sailor Malan at Biggin Hill, Kent

Given the country's attitudes to race at the time, the enlistment of fighting troops from the much larger black population was hardly considered. Instead, in an attempt to free up as many whites as possible for the fighting and technical arms, a number of corps were formed to provide drivers and pioneers, drawn from the more acceptable Cape Coloured and Indian populations. These were eventually amalgamated into the Cape Corps. A Native Military Corps, manned by blacks, was also formed for pioneer and labouring tasks. For some of their tasks, individuals were armed, mainly for self-protection and guard duties, but they were never allowed to participate in actual combat against Europeans.

== Military contributions and casualties in World War II ==
The South African Defence Force contributed in many theatres of war. South Africa's contribution consisted mainly of supplying troops, airmen and material for the North African campaign (the Desert War) and the Italian Campaign as well as to Allied ships that docked at its crucial ports adjoining the Atlantic Ocean and Indian Ocean that converge at the tip of Southern Africa. Numerous volunteers also flew for the Royal Air Force.

1. The South African Army and Air Force played a major role in defeating the Fascist Italian forces of Benito Mussolini during the 1940–1941 East African Campaign. The converted Junkers Ju 86s of 12 Squadron, South African Air Force, carried out the first bombing raid of the campaign on a concentration of Royal Italian Army tanks at Moyale at 8am on 11 June 1940, mere hours after Italy's declaration of war.
2. Another important victory that the South Africans participated in was the liberation of Madagascar from the control of the Vichy French. British troops aided by South African soldiers, staged their attack from South Africa, landing on the strategic island on 4 May 1942 to preclude its seizure by the Japanese Empire.
3. The South African 1st Infantry Division took part in several actions in North Africa in 1941 and 1942, including the Battle of El Alamein, before being withdrawn to South Africa to be re-constituted as an armoured division.
4. The South African 2nd Infantry Division also took part in a number of actions in North Africa during 1942, but on 21 June 1942 two complete infantry brigades of the division as well as most of the supporting units were captured at the fall of Tobruk.
5. The South African 3rd Infantry Division never took an active part in any battles but instead organised and trained the South African home defence forces, performed garrison duties and supplied replacements for the South African 1st Infantry Division and the South African 2nd Infantry Division. One of this division's constituent brigades – 7 SA Motorised Brigade – did take part in the invasion of Madagascar in 1942.
6. The South African 6th Armoured Division fought in numerous actions in Italy in 1944–1945.
7. The South African Air Force (SAAF) made a significant contribution to the air war in East Africa, North Africa, Sicily, Italy, the Balkans and even as far east as bombing missions aimed at the Romanian oilfields in Ploiești, supply missions in support of the Warsaw Uprising, and Eastern Front reconnaissance missions ahead of the Soviet Red Army advances in the Lvov-Cracow area.
8. Numerous South African airmen also volunteered service to the British Royal Air Force, some serving with distinction.
9. South Africa contributed to the war effort against Japan, supplying men and manning ships in naval engagements against the Imperial Japanese Navy.

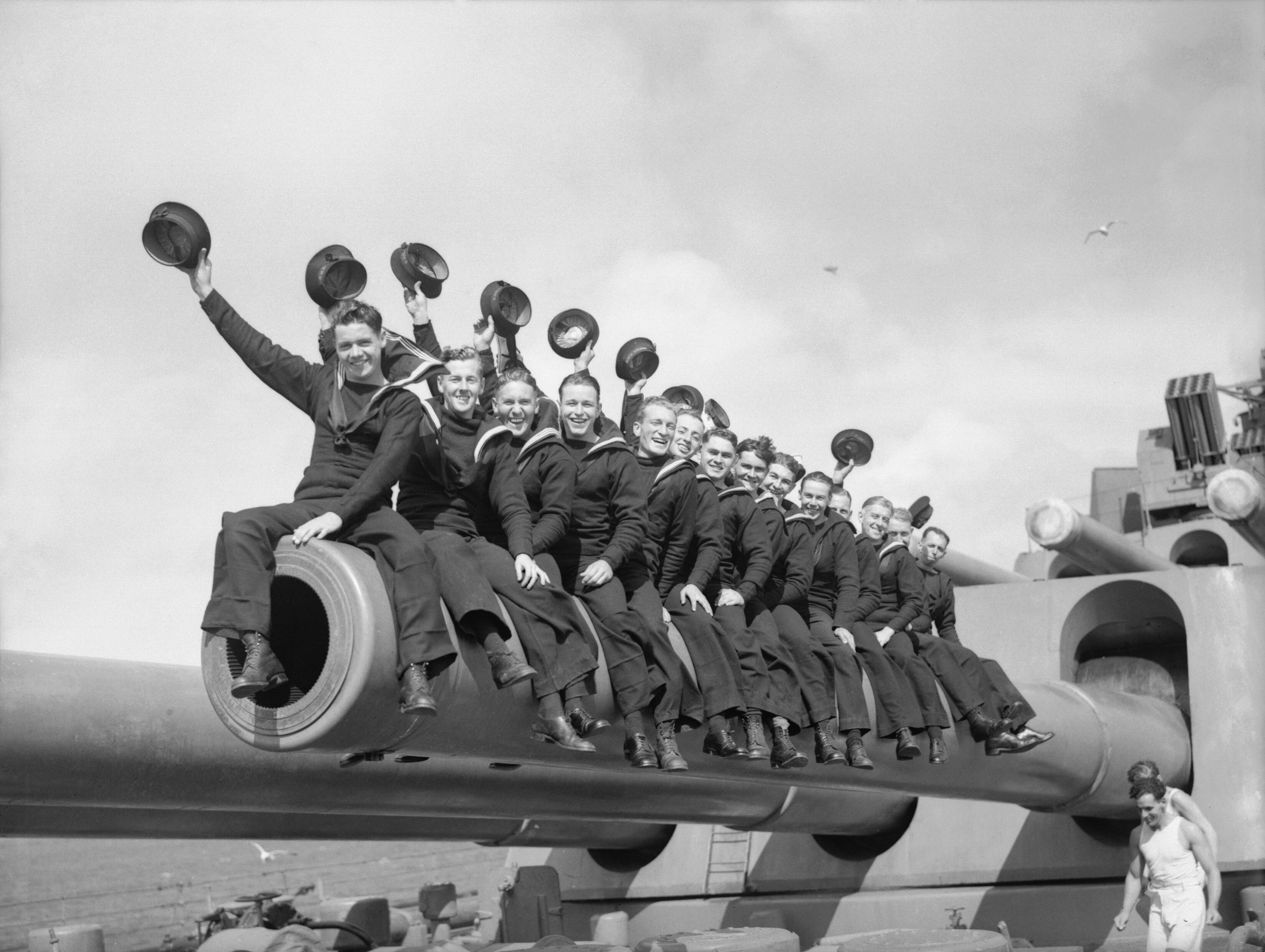
South African naval personnel on board HMS Nelson

About 334,000 men volunteered for full-time service in the South African Army during the war (including some 211,000 white, 77,000 black and 46,000 coloured and Indian servicemen).

== See also ==
- Military production during World War II
- British Empire in World War II

== Literature ==
- André Wessels: "South Africa and the war against Japan 1941–1945", in: Military History Journal, vol. 10 (1996), no. 3, pp. 81–90 & 120.
