= Buffalo Volunteer Rifles =

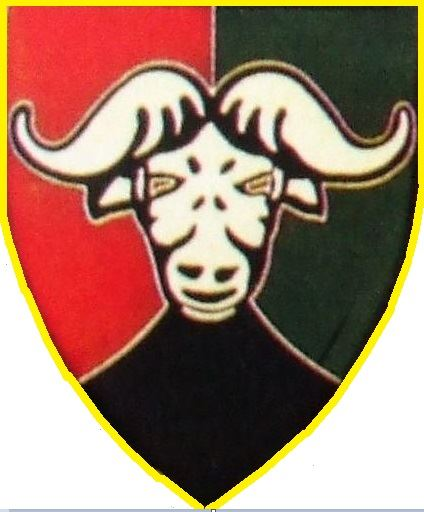
- SANDF Buffalo Volunteers emblem
- Active: 1876 to present
- Country: South Africa
- Allegiance: Republic of South Africa; Republic of South Africa
- Branch: South African Army; South African Army
- Type: Infantry
- Role: Infantry
- Size: One battalion
- Part of: South African Infantry Formation; Army Conventional Reserve
- Garrison/HQ: East London
- Motto: Nunc animus (Now with courage)
- Battle honours: Gaika-Gcaleka 1877; Bechuanaland 1897; South Africa 1899 - 1902; South-West Africa 1914 - 1915; Western Desert 1941 - 1943; Bardia; South-West Africa/Zambia 1979; South-West Africa/Angola 1975 - 1976; South-West Africa/Angola 1976 - 1989

Insignia
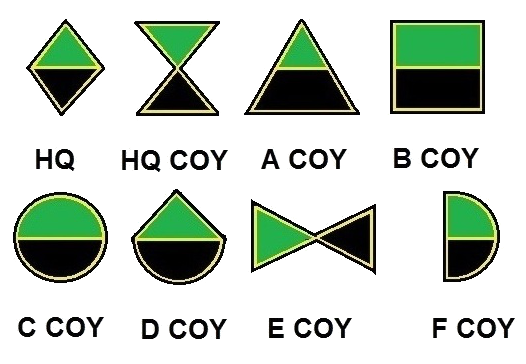
- Company level Insignia

- SA Motorised Infantry beret bar circa 1992: SA Motorised Infantry beret bar

The Buffalo Volunteer Rifles (BVR) (formerly the Kaffrarian Rifles) is an infantry regiment of the South African Army. As a reserve unit, it has a status roughly equivalent to that of a British Army Reserve or United States Army National Guard unit.

== History ==
=== Origin ===
This unit was formed in East London in 1876, as the Buffalo Corps of Rifle Volunteers, for service in the 9th Frontier War. It disbanded in 1879. (East London is situated on the Buffalo River, hence the name).

=== Reformed ===
The unit was re-formed in July 1883 and was named after the region of Kaffraria, the 19th-century name for the region around East London. There had previously been many other units from this region, from which the Regiment can also claim descent:

- Kaffrarian Volunteer Corps,
- Kaffrarian Mounted Rifles (Kaffrarian Rangers),
- Buffalo Volunteer Rifles Corps,
- Buffalo Volunteer Engineers,
- Kaffrarian Volunteer Artillery Corps,
- Berlin Mounted Volunteers,
- Cape Mounted Yeomanry (1st Regiment),
- Frontier Mounted Riflemen (Brabant's Horse),
- East London Volunteers (Von Linsignen's Buffalo Corps and later Walkers Horse).

On 1 December 1900 George Herbert Farrar was appointed as a Major in the Kaffrarian Rifles.

=== Under the Union Defence Force ===
By 1913 the unit was embodied in the Citizen Force as the 5th Infantry (Kaffrarian Rifles), but regained its old name in 1932. In March 1947 the regiment was formally inspected by King George VI on a visit to East London and a photo is available The unit was temporarily amalgamated with the First City Regiment, as the First City/The Kaffrarian Rifles from 1954 to 1956.

=== Conflicts ===
This Regiment and its predecessors took part in all of South Africa's armed conflicts, including:

- Bechuanaland Campaign (1897),
- Second Boer War,
- World War I (when it fought in the then German South-West Africa and most of its members went on to serve in East Africa and Europe),
- World War II (when it fought in the Western Desert during 1941 - 1943) as well as in
- South Africa's "Border War" during 1975 to 1986 (when it fought in South-West Africa, Angola and Zambia).

=== Under the SANDF post 1994 and Peacekeeping ===
In order to keep pace with the changing political climate in South Africa, the regiment was renamed the Buffalo Volunteer Rifles in 1999, a revised form of the regiment's name when it was raised. It is thus de facto and de jure the successor to the reserve SAA formations of the Eastern Cape.

As of 2014 this regiment is considered to be a "fully integrated and representative" army unit. Members have been attached to the United Nations Operation in Burundi and recently a Rifle company returned from the Democratic Republic of the Congo after a six-month spell of active duty as part of MONUSCO.

== Leadership ==
Leadership
From	Honorary Colonel	To	Ribbon
	No known incumbents		
From	Officer Commanding	To	Ribbon
	No known incumbents		
From	Regimental Sergeants Major	To	Ribbon
	No known incumbents		

== Regimental symbols ==
- Current regimental colour (since 2001): a dark green background with embroidered in the centre a wreath of ten proteas and two king proteas. Beneath the wreath and above the ribbon is an aloe with five blooms. This symbolises the BVR link with the Border region, the fact that some of its members are Xhosas from the greater Eastern Cape, and its status of the 5th Infantry Regiment from 1913 to 1933. Within the wreath is the regiment's Maltese cross (symbolic of the regiment's King's Royal Rifle Corps and German affiliations, as many of the Regiment's 19th century members were of German extraction) with a buffalo head in the centre, surrounded by two concentric circles. Between the circles the regimental motto, Nunc animus (meaning "Now with courage" or "Now without fear") is inscribed. At the top of the regimental crest is a powder horn, symbolizing the link with the British Royal Green Jackets regiment.
- East London bestowed the freedom of the city on the regiment on 25 May 1957.

=== Previous Dress Insignia ===
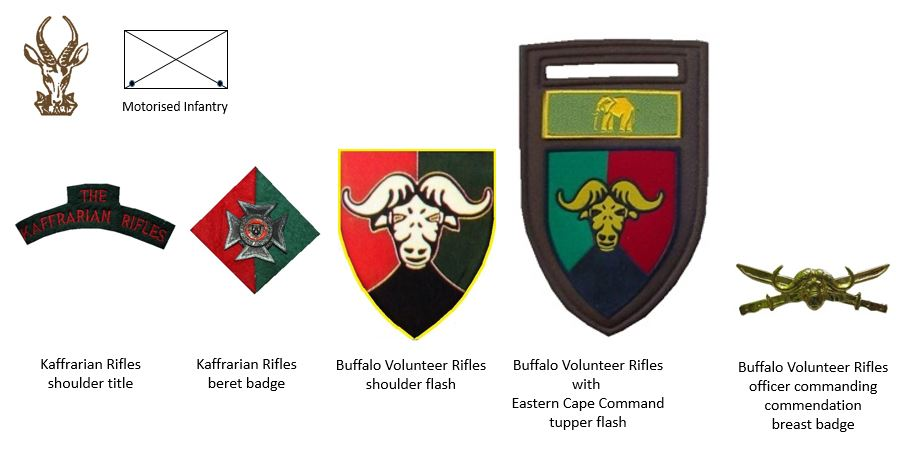
SADF era Buffalo Volunteer Rifles insignia

=== Current Dress Insignia ===
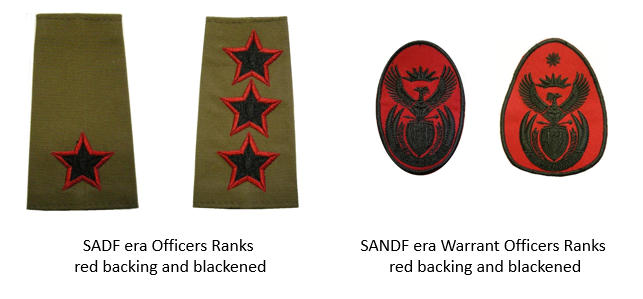
Buffalo Volunteer Rifles unique ranks

The Buffalo Volunteer Rifles still utilize a British Infantry tradition where officers had a red backing and ranks were blackened out on fatigues.

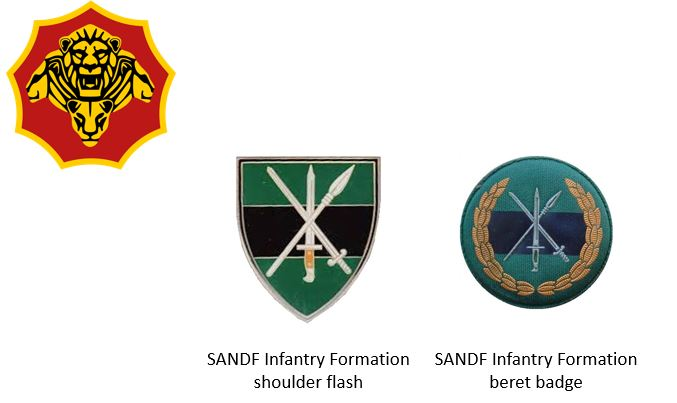
SANDF era Infantry Formation insignia

== Alliances ==
- United Kingdom - The Rifles

== Battle honours ==
Gaika-Gcaleka 1877, Bechuanaland 1897, South Africa 1899 – 1902, South-West Africa 1914 – 1915, Western Desert 1941 – 1943, Bardia (Note: Because the Germans captured almost the entire regiment at Tobruk in June 1942, the regiment received no further World War II battle honours.), South-West Africa/Zambia 1979, South-West Africa/Angola 1975 – 1976, South-West Africa/Angola 1976 – 1989

Battle Honours
Awarded to the Kaffrarian Rifles
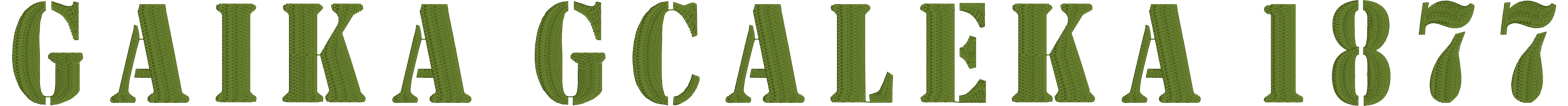
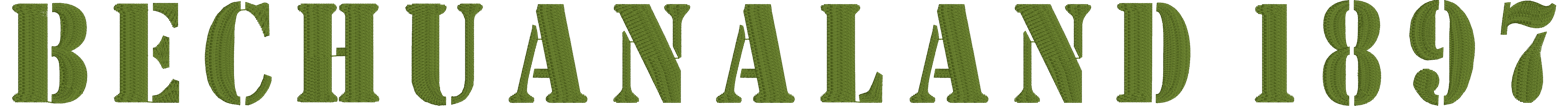
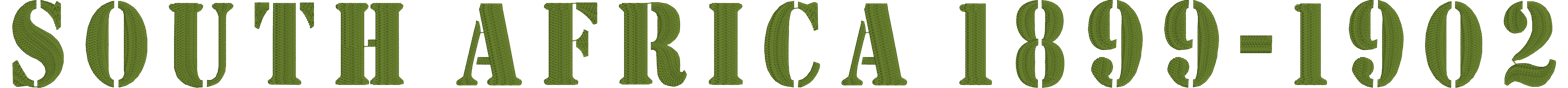
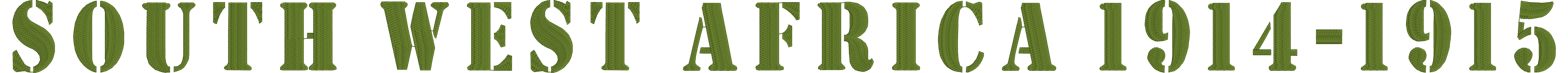
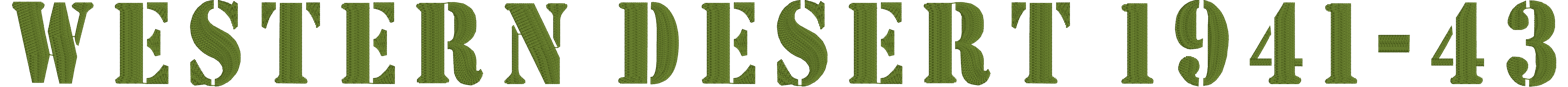
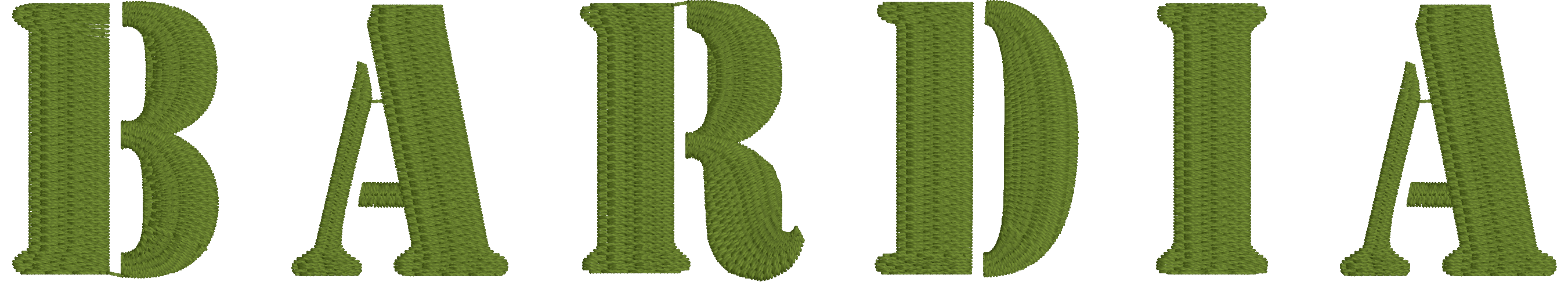
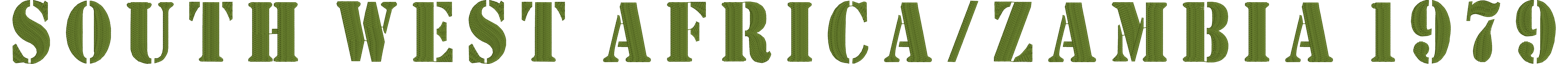
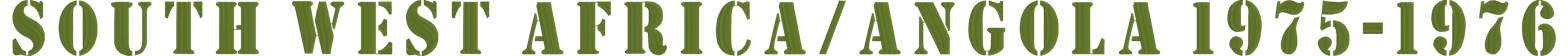
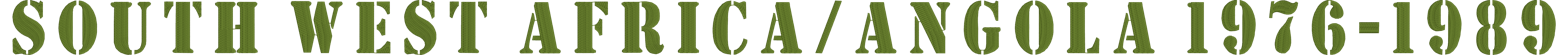

The regiment claims four more battle honours, which have not been acknowledged: Transkei 1879, Transkei 1880 – 1881, Basutoland 1880 – 1881, Wepener. (Note: During the Second Boer War)

Battle Honours
Claimed
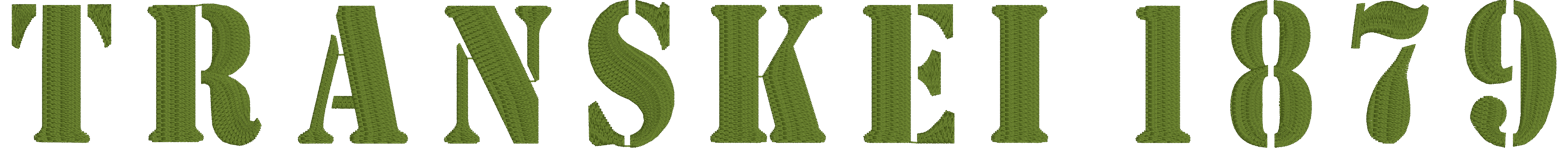
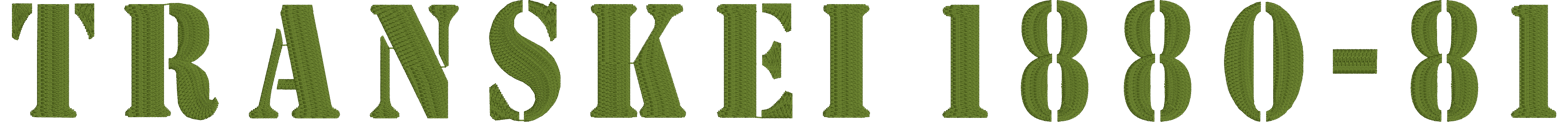
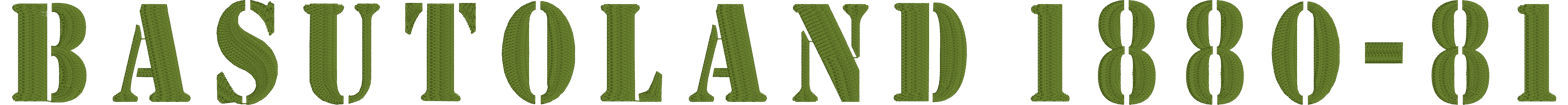
