= List of South African Battle Honours =

Battle honours awarded to South African military units

The South African National Defence Force follows the British Army tradition of awarding battle honours to military units to recognise battles and campaigns in which they fought with distinction. This list is generated from Module:BattleHonour/data, the single source of truth used by Template:BattleHonour on unit pages.

== Overview ==
| Code | Name | Image | Period | Description |
|---|---|---|---|---|
| Cape_of_Good_Hope | Cape of Good Hope | Cape of Good Hope | Colonial and pre-Union campaigns | Early Cape honour associated with service at the Cape of Good Hope; retained on some South African unit colour lines. |
| Gaika_Gcaleka_1877 | Gaika Gcaleka 1877 | Gaika Gcaleka 1877 | Colonial and pre-Union campaigns | Cape colonial operations in the Ninth Xhosa War (also called the Gaika–Gcaleka War) of 1877–78 on the eastern frontier. |
| Griqualand_West_1878 | Griqualand West 1878 | Griqualand West 1878 | Colonial and pre-Union campaigns | Operations in Griqualand West during colonial frontier fighting in 1878. |
| Transkei_1877_78 | Transkei 1877-78 | Transkei 1877-78 | Colonial and pre-Union campaigns | Cape forces’ campaigning in the Transkei during the 1877–78 frontier wars. |
| South_Africa_1879 | South Africa 1879 | South Africa 1879 | Colonial and pre-Union campaigns | Participation in the Anglo-Zulu War of 1879, including colonial and imperial operations in Zululand and Natal. |
| Transkei_1879 | Transkei 1879 | Transkei 1879 | Colonial and pre-Union campaigns | Further Transkei operations associated with the 1879 campaigning period. |
| Umzintzani | Umzintzani | Umzintzani | Colonial and pre-Union campaigns | Honour for action at Umzintzani during late-nineteenth-century Cape frontier operations. |
| Basutoland_1880_81 | Basutoland 1880-81 | Basutoland 1880-81 | Colonial and pre-Union campaigns | Cape Colony operations in Basutoland (Lesotho) during the Basuto Gun War of 1880–81. |
| Transkei_1880_81 | Transkei 1880-81 | Transkei 1880-81 | Colonial and pre-Union campaigns | Transkei campaigning concurrent with the Basuto Gun War period (1880–81). |
| Bechuanaland_1896_97 | Bechuanaland 1896-97 | Bechuanaland 1896-97 | Colonial and pre-Union campaigns | Cape military and police operations against Batswana communities from December 1896 to August 1897, largely in the Langeberg (Langberg) mountains. |
| Bechuanaland_1897 | Bechuanaland 1897 | Bechuanaland 1897 | Colonial and pre-Union campaigns | Related Bechuanaland honour dated 1897 for the same Langeberg campaigning season. |
| Defence_of_Kimberley | Defence of Kimberley | Defence of Kimberley | Second Boer War | Defence of Kimberley during its siege (October 1899 – February 1900) in the Second Boer War. |
| South_Africa_1899_1902 | South Africa 1899-1902 | South Africa 1899-1902 | Second Boer War | Theatre honour for the Second Boer War (October 1899 – May 1902), covering Cape, Natal and imperial/colonial units authorised by the British government. |
| Defence_of_Ladysmith | Defence of Ladysmith | Defence of Ladysmith | Second Boer War | Defence of Ladysmith during the Boer siege from November 1899 to February 1900. |
| Relief_of_Ladysmith | Relief of Ladysmith | Relief of Ladysmith | Second Boer War | Operations culminating in the relief of Ladysmith in late February 1900. |
| Wepener | Wepener | Wepener | Second Boer War | Defence of Wepener (Jammerberg Drift) during the Boer siege of April–May 1900. |
| Natal_1906 | Natal 1906 | Natal 1906 | Colonial and pre-Union campaigns | Natal militia and police operations during the Bambatha (Zulu) Rebellion of 1906. |
| South_West_Africa_1914_1915 | South West Africa 1914–1915 | South West Africa 1914–1915 | First World War — South West Africa | Theatre honour for the South West Africa campaign of 1914–1915 against German colonial forces. |
| South_West_Africa_1915 | South West Africa 1915 | South West Africa 1915 | First World War — South West Africa | Campaign honour for the 1915 conquest of German South West Africa by Union forces. |
| Gibeon | Gibeon | Gibeon | First World War — South West Africa | Action at Gibeon (25 April 1915) during the South West Africa campaign, where Union mounted troops defeated a German force. |
| East_Africa_1916_17 | East Africa 1916-17 | East Africa 1916-17 | First World War — East Africa | East African theatre honour for Union units campaigning against German East Africa in 1916–17. |
| East_Africa_1916_18 | East Africa 1916-18 | East Africa 1916-18 | First World War — East Africa | Broader East African theatre honour covering 1916–18 operations against German East Africa. |
| Egypt_1916 | Egypt 1916 | Egypt 1916 | First World War — Egypt and Palestine | Service in Egypt in 1916 during the Sinai and Palestine campaigns. |
| France_and_Flanders_1916_18 | France and Flanders 1916-18 | France and Flanders 1916-18 | First World War — Western Front | Theatre honour for South African service on the Western Front in France and Flanders, 1916–18. |
| German_East_Africa_1916_18 | German East Africa 1916-18 | German East Africa 1916-18 | First World War — East Africa | Honour for service in German East Africa during the First World War East African campaign. |
| Kilimanjaro | Kilimanjaro | Kilimanjaro | First World War — East Africa | Operations around Mount Kilimanjaro early in the East African campaign (1916). |
| Delville_Wood | Delville Wood | Delville Wood | First World War — Western Front | Defence and fighting in Delville Wood (July 1916) by the 1st South African Infantry Brigade on the Somme. |
| Somme_1916 | Somme 1916 | Somme 1916 | First World War — Western Front | South African Brigade fighting on the Somme in 1916, including the July battles around Longueval and Delville Wood. |
| Le_Transloy | Le Transloy | Le Transloy | First World War — Western Front | Operations in the Le Transloy sector during the later Somme fighting of autumn 1916. |
| Behobeho | Behobeho | Behobeho | First World War — East Africa | Action at Behobeho during the East African campaign against German colonial forces. |
| East_Africa_1917_18 | East Africa 1917-18 | East Africa 1917-18 | First World War — East Africa | East African theatre honour for the later 1917–18 phase of the campaign. |
| Gaza | Gaza | Gaza | First World War — Egypt and Palestine | Battles for Gaza (1917) in the Sinai and Palestine campaign. |
| Arras | Arras | Arras | First World War — Western Front | South African participation in the Battle of Arras (April 1917) on the Western Front. |
| Scarpe_1917 | Scarpe 1917 | Scarpe 1917 | First World War — Western Front | Fighting along the Scarpe during the Arras offensive of 1917. |
| Narungombe | Narungombe | Narungombe | First World War — East Africa | Fighting at Narungombe in German East Africa during 1917. |
| Ypres_1917 | Ypres 1917 | Ypres 1917 | First World War — Western Front | Third Battle of Ypres (Passchendaele) operations involving South African units in 1917. |
| Menin_Road | Menin Road | Menin Road | First World War — Western Front | Battle of the Menin Road Ridge (September 1917) during the Ypres offensive. |
| Nyangao | Nyangao | Nyangao | First World War — East Africa | Battle of Nyangao (October 1917) in the East African campaign. |
| El_Mughar | El Mughar | El Mughar | First World War — Egypt and Palestine | Battle of Mughar Ridge (November 1917) during the advance into Palestine. |
| Nebi_Samwil | Nebi Samwil | Nebi Samwil | First World War — Egypt and Palestine | Fighting at Nebi Samwil during the 1917 Jerusalem operations. |
| France_and_Flanders_1918 | France and Flanders 1918 | France and Flanders 1918 | First World War — Western Front | Theatre honour focused on Western Front operations in 1918. |
| Palestine_1918 | Palestine 1918 | Palestine 1918 | First World War — Egypt and Palestine | Theatre honour for Palestine operations in 1918. |
| Tel_Asur | Tel Asur | Tel Asur | First World War — Egypt and Palestine | Operations at Tel Asur in Palestine in March 1918. |
| Kemmel | Kemmel | Kemmel | First World War — Western Front | Fighting for the Kemmelberg / Mount Kemmel area during the Lys battles of 1918. |
| Lys | Lys | Lys | First World War — Western Front | Battle of the Lys (April 1918) during the German spring offensive in Flanders. |
| Messines_1918 | Messines 1918 | Messines 1918 | First World War — Western Front | Actions around Messines during the German spring offensives and Allied responses of 1918. |
| Hindenburg_Line | Hindenburg Line | Hindenburg Line | First World War — Western Front | Assaults on the Hindenburg Line during the Hundred Days Offensive of 1918. |
| Megiddo | Megiddo | Megiddo | First World War — Egypt and Palestine | Battle of Megiddo (September 1918), the decisive Allied offensive in Palestine. |
| Nablus | Nablus | Nablus | First World War — Egypt and Palestine | Advance on Nablus during the September 1918 Palestine offensive. |
| Sharon | Sharon | Sharon | First World War — Egypt and Palestine | Battle of Sharon component of the Megiddo offensive (September 1918). |
| Cambrai_1918 | Cambrai 1918 | Cambrai 1918 | First World War — Western Front | Battle of Cambrai (October 1918) in the final Allied advance in France. |
| Selle | Selle | Selle | First World War — Western Front | Crossing of the Selle and related operations in October 1918. |
| Pursuit_to_Mons | Pursuit to Mons | Pursuit to Mons | First World War — Western Front | Final advance toward Mons in November 1918 during the Hundred Days Offensive. |
| Sambre | Sambre | Sambre | First World War — Western Front | Battle of the Sambre (4 November 1918) near the end of the war on the Western Front. |
| East_Africa_1940_41 | East Africa 1940-41 | East Africa 1940-41 | Second World War — East Africa | East African campaign of 1940–41 against Italian forces in Italian East Africa. |
| El_Wak | El Wak | El Wak | Second World War — East Africa | Raid and action at El Wak (December 1940) on the Kenya–Somalia frontier. |
| Bardia | Bardia | Bardia | Second World War — Western Desert | Assault on Bardia (January 1941 / later desert operations involving South African formations). |
| El_Yibo | El Yibo | El Yibo | Second World War — East Africa | East African honour for fighting at El Yibo during the 1941 advance. |
| Sollum | Sollum | Sollum | Second World War — Western Desert | Operations around Sollum on the Egypt–Libya frontier during the desert war. |
| Western_Desert_1941_43 | Western Desert 1941-43 | Western Desert 1941-43 | Second World War — Western Desert | Theatre honour for the Western Desert campaign in North Africa, 1941–43. |
| Mega | Mega | Mega | Second World War — East Africa | Capture of Mega in southern Ethiopia during the 1941 East African campaign. |
| The_Juba | The Juba | The Juba | Second World War — East Africa | Operations along the Juba River during the advance through Italian Somaliland (1941). |
| Yonte | Yonte | Yonte | Second World War — East Africa | Action at Yonte during the East African campaign of 1941. |
| Diredawa | Diredawa | Diredawa | Second World War — East Africa | Occupation of Dire Dawa during the advance into Ethiopia (1941). |
| Combolcia | Combolcia | Combolcia | Second World War — East Africa | Fighting at Combolcia during the Ethiopian campaign of 1941. |
| Amba_Alagi | Amba Alagi | Amba Alagi | Second World War — East Africa | Battle of Amba Alagi (May 1941), where Italian forces in Ethiopia surrendered to Allied troops including South Africans. |
| Halfaya | Halfaya | Halfaya | Second World War — Western Desert | Fighting for Halfaya Pass (“Hellfire Pass”) on the frontier escarpment. |
| Point_204 | Point 204 | Point 204 | Second World War — Western Desert | Locality honour for Point 204 fighting in the Western Desert. |
| Sidi_Rezegh | Sidi Rezegh | Sidi Rezegh | Second World War — Western Desert | Battle of Sidi Rezegh (November 1941) during Operation Crusader, costly for South African armour and infantry. |
| Taieb_el_Essem | Taieb el Essem | Taieb el Essem | Second World War — Western Desert | Western Desert action at Taieb el Essem during the Crusader period. |
| Alem_Hamza | Alem Hamza | Alem Hamza | Second World War — Western Desert | Holding and fighting around Alem Hamza in the Gazala–Acroma area. |
| Best_Post | Best Post | Best Post | Second World War — Western Desert | Defence of Best Post during Western Desert operations. |
| Bir_Sciafsciuf | Bir Sciafsciuf | Bir Sciafsciuf | Second World War — Western Desert | Desert engagement around Bir Sciafsciuf. |
| Bir_Temrad | Bir Temrad | Bir Temrad | Second World War — Western Desert | Desert engagement around Bir Temrad. |
| Gazala | Gazala | Gazala | Second World War — Western Desert | Battle of Gazala (May–June 1942), in which Axis forces broke the Allied Gazala Line west of Tobruk. |
| Madagascar | Madagascar | Madagascar | Second World War — Madagascar | Participation in the Allied invasion and occupation of Vichy-held Madagascar (1942). |
| Madagascar_1942 | Madagascar 1942 | Madagascar 1942 | Second World War — Madagascar | Dated theatre honour for the 1942 Madagascar operations. |
| Acroma_Keep | Acroma Keep | Acroma Keep | Second World War — Western Desert | Defence of the Acroma Keep locality during the Gazala battles. |
| Commonwealth_Keep | Commonwealth Keep | Commonwealth Keep | Second World War — Western Desert | Defence of Commonwealth Keep during the Gazala–Tobruk fighting. |
| Dadaba | Dadaba | Dadaba | Second World War — Western Desert | Western Desert locality honour for Dadaba. |
| Mersa_Belafarit | Mersa Belafarit | Mersa Belafarit | Second World War — Western Desert | Coastal desert action at Mersa Belafarit. |
| Tobruk | Tobruk | Tobruk | Second World War — Western Desert | Fall and related fighting around Tobruk in June 1942, including capture of the South African 2nd Division. |
| Alamein_Box | Alamein Box | Alamein Box | Second World War — Western Desert | Defence of a box position in the Alamein line during the 1942 desert battles. |
| Alamein_Defence | Alamein Defence | Alamein Defence | Second World War — Western Desert | Defensive fighting in the El Alamein line during mid-1942 (First Alamein period). |
| Alem_el_Halfa | Alem el Halfa | Alem el Halfa | Second World War — Western Desert | Battle of Alam el Halfa (August–September 1942), Rommel’s failed attempt to turn the Alamein position. |
| Qattara_Track | Qattara Track | Qattara Track | Second World War — Western Desert | Operations along the Qattara Track on the southern Alamein flank. |
| Springbok_Road | Springbok Road | Springbok Road | Second World War — Western Desert | Locality honour for Springbok Road during the Alamein fighting. |
| El_Alamein | El Alamein | El Alamein | Second World War — Western Desert | Second Battle of El Alamein (October–November 1942), the decisive Allied victory in the Western Desert. |
| Casino_II | Casino II | Casino II | Second World War — Italy | Second Cassino / Cassino II operations in the Liri Valley approach to Rome (1944). |
| Italy_1944_45 | Italy 1944-45 | Italy 1944-45 | Second World War — Italy | Theatre honour for the Italian campaign of 1944–45, principally 6th South African Armoured Division. |
| Allerona | Allerona | Allerona | Second World War — Italy | Action at Allerona in the Tiber valley advance. |
| Bagno_Regio | Bagno Regio | Bagno Regio | Second World War — Italy | Operations around Bagno Regio in central Italy. |
| Celleno | Celleno | Celleno | Second World War — Italy | Fighting at Celleno during the 1944 Italian advance. |
| Chiusi | Chiusi | Chiusi | Second World War — Italy | Battle for Chiusi during the advance through Tuscany. |
| Citta_delia_Pieve | Citta delia Pieve | Citta delia Pieve | Second World War — Italy | Fighting for Città della Pieve during the advance toward Florence (spelling on the colour follows historical issue). |
| Paliano | Paliano | Paliano | Second World War — Italy | Action at Paliano during the advance north of Rome. |
| Rome | Rome | Rome | Second World War — Italy | Advance on and entry into Rome following the Cassino breakthrough (June 1944). |
| Sarteano | Sarteano | Sarteano | Second World War — Italy | Action at Sarteano in the Tuscan advance. |
| The_Tiber | The Tiber | The Tiber | Second World War — Italy | Operations along the Tiber during the 1944 Italian campaign. |
| La_Foce | La Foce | La Foce | Second World War — Italy | Fighting around La Foce during operations toward Florence. |
| The_Greve | The Greve | The Greve | Second World War — Italy | Crossing and fighting along the Greve during the advance on Florence. |
| Campo_Santo_Bridge | Campo Santo Bridge | Campo Santo Bridge | Second World War — Italy | Action at Campo Santo Bridge during Italian campaign operations. |
| Catarelto_Ridge | Catarelto Ridge | Catarelto Ridge | Second World War — Italy | Fighting on Catarelto Ridge in the approach to the Gothic Line. |
| Florence | Florence | Florence | Second World War — Italy | Liberation and fighting around Florence in August 1944. |
| Gothic_Line | Gothic Line | Gothic Line | Second World War — Italy | Assaults on the German Gothic Line in the northern Apennines (1944–45). |
| Monte_Fili | Monte Fili | Monte Fili | Second World War — Italy | Action at Monte Fili during the Gothic Line battles. |
| Monte_Querciabella | Monte Querciabella | Monte Querciabella | Second World War — Italy | Mountain fighting at Monte Querciabella on the Gothic Line approaches. |
| Monte_Pezza | Monte Pezza | Monte Pezza | Second World War — Italy | Mountain action at Monte Pezza in the Gothic Line sector. |
| Monte_Porro_del_Bagno | Monte Porro del Bagno | Monte Porro del Bagno | Second World War — Italy | Fighting at Monte Porro del Bagno in the Apennines. |
| Monte_Salvaro | Monte Salvaro | Monte Salvaro | Second World War — Italy | Fighting for Monte Salvaro in the Gothic Line battles. |
| Monte_Stanco | Monte Stanco | Monte Stanco | Second World War — Italy | Capture/fighting at Monte Stanco during the Gothic Line offensive. |
| Monte_Vigese | Monte Vigese | Monte Vigese | Second World War — Italy | Action at Monte Vigese during the Italian mountain campaign. |
| Po_Valley | Po Valley | Po Valley | Second World War — Italy | Spring 1945 offensive into the Po Valley, ending organised German resistance in Italy. |
| Sole_Caprara | Sole/Caprara | Sole/Caprara | Second World War — Italy | Final Apennine actions around Sole/Caprara in spring 1945. |
| Rhodesia_1967_75 | Rhodesia 1967-75 | Rhodesia 1967-75 | Border War and southern Africa | South African support and operations connected with the Rhodesian Bush War period (1967–75) as recognised for unit honours. |
| South_West_Africa_Angola_1975_1976 | South West Africa/Angola 1975-1976 | South West Africa/Angola 1975-1976 | Border War and southern Africa | Early Border War theatre honour for South West Africa/Angola operations in 1975–76, including Operation Savannah. |
| South_West_Africa_Angola_1976_1989 | South West Africa/Angola 1976-1989 | South West Africa/Angola 1976-1989 | Border War and southern Africa | Long theatre honour for South West Africa/Angola operations from 1976 to 1989. |
| Cassinga_Chetequera | Cassinga/Chetequera | Cassinga/Chetequera | Border War and southern Africa | May 1978 airborne and ground operations against SWAPO at Cassinga and related Chetequera objectives (Operation Reindeer). |
| South_West_Africa_Zambia_1979 | South West Africa/Zambia 1979 | South West Africa/Zambia 1979 | Border War and southern Africa | Honour for 1979 operations involving South West Africa/Zambia. |
| Xangongo_Ongiva | Xangongo/Ongiva | Xangongo/Ongiva | Border War and southern Africa | Operation Protea (1981) seizure of Xangongo and Ongiva in southern Angola. |
| Mulemba_Mulola | Mulemba/Mulola | Mulemba/Mulola | Border War and southern Africa | Border War honour for operations in the Mulemba/Mulola area. |
| Mavinga_II | Mavinga II | Mavinga II | Border War and southern Africa | Fighting in the Mavinga sector (second recognised phase) during Angolan operations. |
| Mavinga_III | Mavinga III | Mavinga III | Border War and southern Africa | Later Mavinga-sector operations culminating in the 1987–88 Lomba/Cuito fighting. |
| Cuito_Cuanaval | Cuito Cuanaval | Cuito Cuanaval | Border War and southern Africa | Battle of Cuito Cuanavale (1987–88); spelling on some colours follows the issued form “Cuito Cuanaval”. |
| Kunene | Kunene | Kunene | Border War and southern Africa | Operations along the Kunene (Cunene) River frontier during the Border War. |
| Calueque | Calueque | Calueque | Border War and southern Africa | June 1988 strike on the Calueque dam/bridge complex on the Cunene during the late Border War. |
| Bangui | Bangui | Bangui | Border War and southern Africa | Battle of Bangui (March 2013), in which a small SANDF force fought Seleka rebels during a Central African Republic deployment. |

== Colonial and pre-Union campaigns ==
=== Cape of Good Hope ===
Main article: Cape of Good Hope

| Cape of Good Hope — Early Cape honour associated with service at the Cape of Good Hope; retained on some South African unit colour lines. |

==== Recipient units ====
- Cape Corps

Module code: Cape_of_Good_Hope

=== Gaika Gcaleka 1877 ===
Main article: Ninth Xhosa War

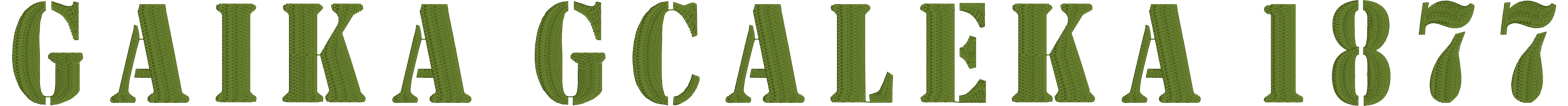
| Gaika Gcaleka 1877 — Cape colonial operations in the Ninth Xhosa War (also called the Gaika–Gcaleka War) of 1877–78 on the eastern frontier. |

==== Recipient units ====
- Prince Alfred's Own Volunteer Guards
- Kimberley Volunteer Regiment
- Kaffrarian Rifle Volunteers
- First City Volunteers of Grahamstown
- Cape Town Rifles

Module code: Gaika_Gcaleka_1877

=== Griqualand West 1878 ===
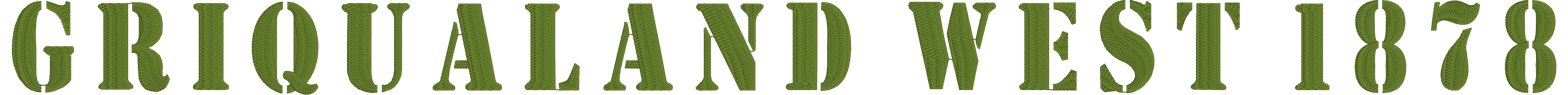
| Griqualand West 1878 — Operations in Griqualand West during colonial frontier fighting in 1878. |

==== Recipient units ====
- Kimberley Volunteer Regiment

Module code: Griqualand_West_1878

=== Transkei 1877-78 ===
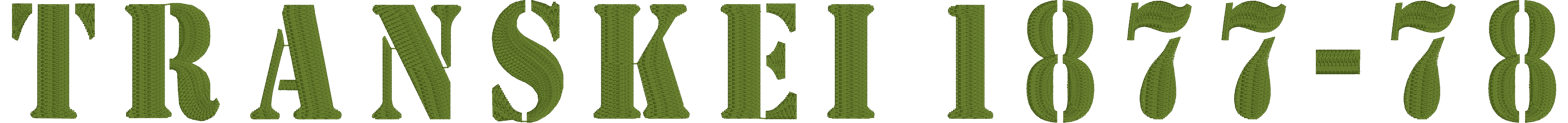
| Transkei 1877-78 — Cape forces’ campaigning in the Transkei during the 1877–78 frontier wars. |

==== Recipient units ====
- Prince Alfred's Own Volunteer Guards

Module code: Transkei_1877_78

=== South Africa 1879 ===
Main article: Anglo-Zulu War

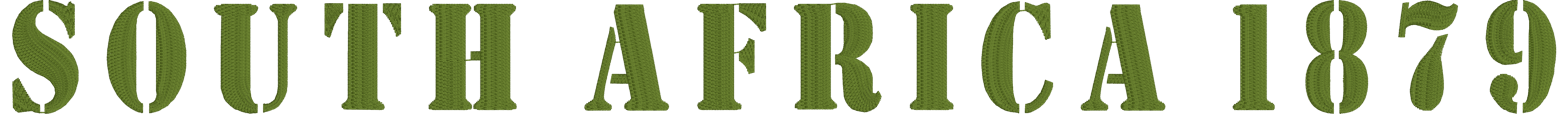
| South Africa 1879 — Participation in the Anglo-Zulu War of 1879, including colonial and imperial operations in Zululand and Natal. |

==== Recipient units ====
- Umvoti Mounted Rifles
- Royal Natal Carbineers
- Royal Durban Light Infantry
- Natal Mounted Rifles
- Border Mounted Rifles

Module code: South_Africa_1879

=== Transkei 1879 ===
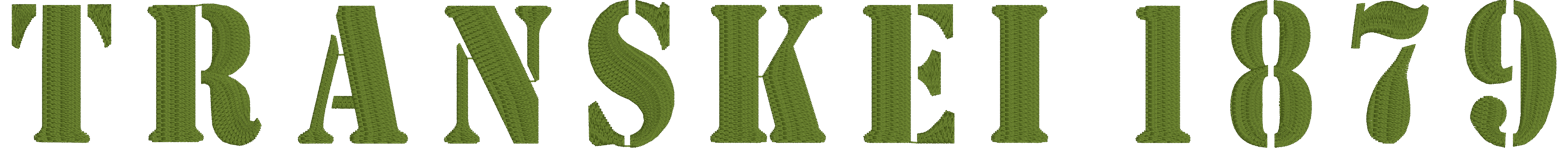
| Transkei 1879 — Further Transkei operations associated with the 1879 campaigning period. |

==== Recipient units ====
- Cape Town Rifles

Module code: Transkei_1879

=== Umzintzani ===
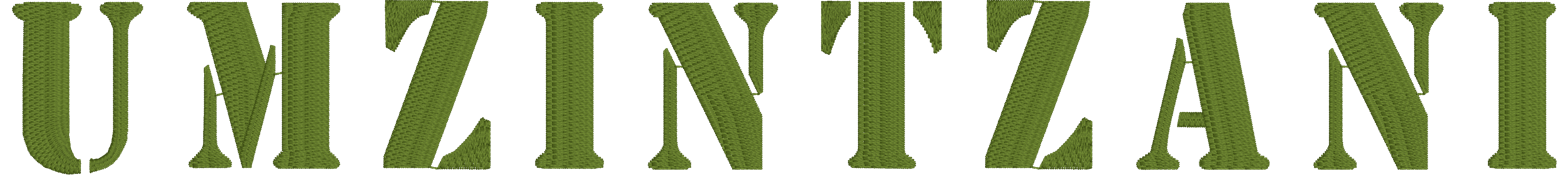
| Umzintzani — Honour for action at Umzintzani during late-nineteenth-century Cape frontier operations. |

==== Recipient units ====
- Prince Alfred's Own Volunteer Guards

Module code: Umzintzani

=== Basutoland 1880-81 ===
Main article: Basuto Gun War

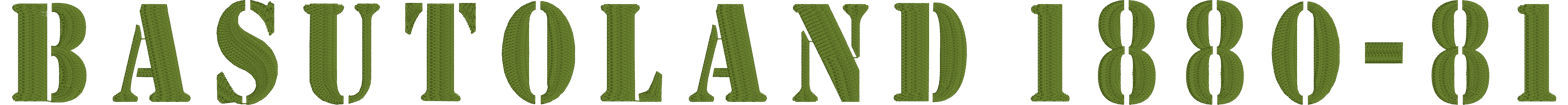
| Basutoland 1880-81 — Cape Colony operations in Basutoland (Lesotho) during the Basuto Gun War of 1880–81. |

==== Recipient units ====
- Prince Alfred's Own Volunteer Guards
- Kimberley Volunteer Regiment
- First City Volunteers of Grahamstown
- Cape Town Rifles

Module code: Basutoland_1880_81

=== Transkei 1880-81 ===
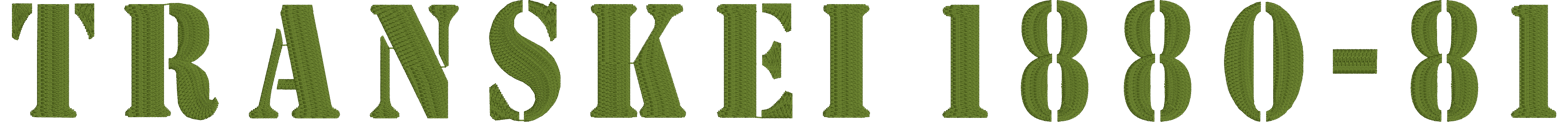
| Transkei 1880-81 — Transkei campaigning concurrent with the Basuto Gun War period (1880–81). |

==== Recipient units ====
- Kimberley Volunteer Regiment

Module code: Transkei_1880_81

=== Bechuanaland 1896-97 ===
Main article: Bechuanaland

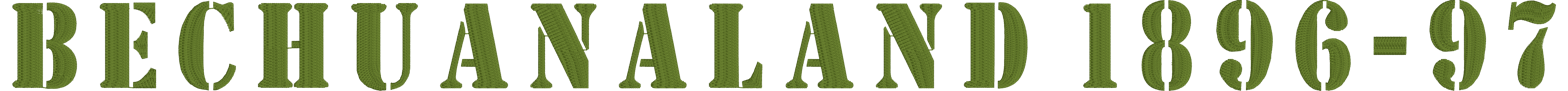
| Bechuanaland 1896-97 — Cape military and police operations against Batswana communities from December 1896 to August 1897, largely in the Langeberg (Langberg) mountains. |

==== Recipient units ====
- Kimberley Volunteer Regiment
- Cape Town Highlanders, The Duke of Connaught and Strathearn's Own

Module code: Bechuanaland_1896_97

=== Bechuanaland 1897 ===
Main article: Bechuanaland

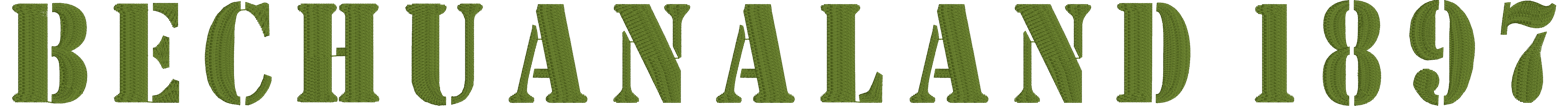
| Bechuanaland 1897 — Related Bechuanaland honour dated 1897 for the same Langeberg campaigning season. Note: Commons filename uses historical misspelling Bechualand. |

==== Recipient units ====
- Prince Alfred's Own Volunteer Guards
- Kaffrarian Rifle Volunteers
- First City Volunteers of Grahamstown
- Cape Town Rifles

Module code: Bechuanaland_1897

=== Natal 1906 ===
Main article: Bambatha Rebellion

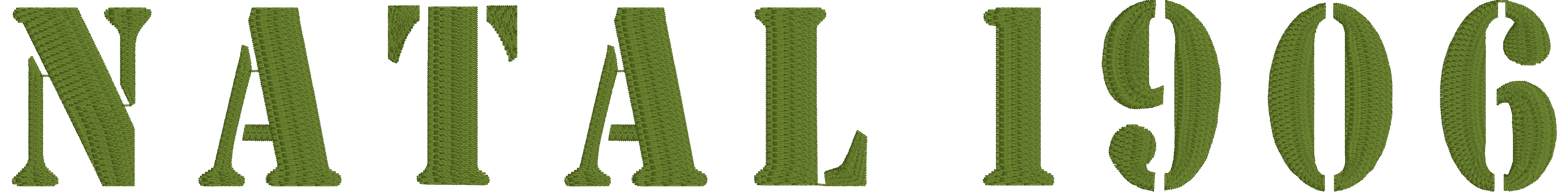
| Natal 1906 — Natal militia and police operations during the Bambatha (Zulu) Rebellion of 1906. |

==== Recipient units ====
- Zululand Mounted Rifles
- Umvoti Mounted Rifles
- Royal Natal Carbineers
- Royal Durban Light Infantry
- Northern Districts Mounted Rifles
- Natal Royal Regiment
- Natal Mounted Rifles
- Imperial Light Horse
- Border Mounted Rifles

Module code: Natal_1906

== Second Boer War ==
=== Defence of Kimberley ===
Main article: Siege of Kimberley

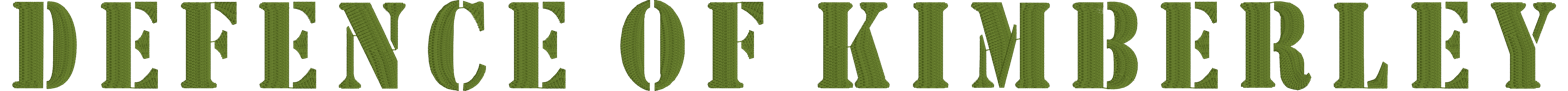
| Defence of Kimberley — Defence of Kimberley during its siege (October 1899 – February 1900) in the Second Boer War. |

==== Recipient units ====
- Kimberley Volunteer Regiment

Module code: Defence_of_Kimberley

=== South Africa 1899-1902 ===
Main article: Second Boer War

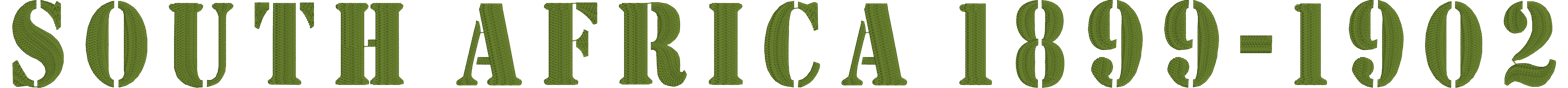
| South Africa 1899-1902 — Theatre honour for the Second Boer War (October 1899 – May 1902), covering Cape, Natal and imperial/colonial units authorised by the British government. |

==== Recipient units ====
- Umvoti Mounted Rifles
- Uitenhage Volunteer Rifles
- Transkei Mounted Rifles
- Royal Natal Carbineers
- Royal Durban Light Infantry
- Queenstown Rifle Volunteers
- Prince Alfred's Own Volunteer Guards
- Natal Royal Regiment
- Natal Mounted Rifles
- Kimberley Volunteer Regiment
- Kaffrarian Rifle Volunteers
- Imperial Light Horse
- First City Volunteers of Grahamstown
- Cape Town Rifles
- Cape Town Highlanders, The Duke of Connaught and Strathearn's Own
- Border Mounted Rifles

Module code: South_Africa_1899_1902

=== Defence of Ladysmith ===
Main article: Siege of Ladysmith

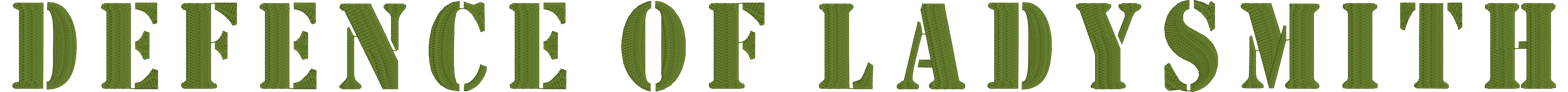
| Defence of Ladysmith — Defence of Ladysmith during the Boer siege from November 1899 to February 1900. |

==== Recipient units ====
- Royal Natal Carbineers
- Natal Mounted Rifles
- Imperial Light Horse
- Border Mounted Rifles

Module code: Defence_of_Ladysmith

=== Relief of Ladysmith ===
Main article: Relief of Ladysmith

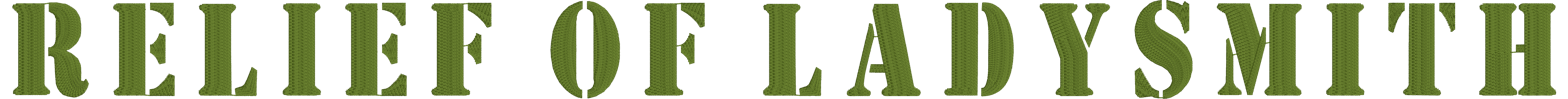
| Relief of Ladysmith — Operations culminating in the relief of Ladysmith in late February 1900. |

==== Recipient units ====
- Umvoti Mounted Rifles
- Royal Durban Light Infantry
- Natal Royal Regiment
- Imperial Light Horse

Module code: Relief_of_Ladysmith

=== Wepener ===
Main article: Siege of Wepener

| Wepener — Defence of Wepener (Jammerberg Drift) during the Boer siege of April–May 1900. |

==== Recipient units ====
- Kaffrarian Rifles

Module code: Wepener

== First World War — South West Africa ==
=== South West Africa 1914–1915 ===
Main article: South West Africa campaign

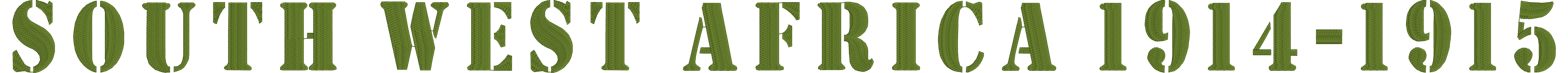
| South West Africa 1914–1915 — Theatre honour for the South West Africa campaign of 1914–1915 against German colonial forces. |

==== Recipient units ====
- Witwatersrand Rifles Regiment
- Western Province Mounted Rifles
- Umvoti Mounted Rifles
- Transvaal Scottish Regiment
- Transvaal Horse Artillery
- South African Heavy Artillery
- SA MR Field Artillery
- S.A. Police (1913–1994)
- S.A. Mounted Rifles
- South African Irish Regiment
- Royal Natal Carbineers
- Royal Durban Light Infantry
- Rand Rifles
- Rand Light Infantry
- Pretoria Regiment
- Potchefstroom Ruiters
- Noordelike Transvaal Berede Skutters
- Natal Mounted Rifles
- Natal Field Artillery
- Midlandse Skutters
- Midlandse Ruiters
- Kimberley Volunteer Regiment
- Kaffrarian Rifle Volunteers
- Imperial Light Horse
- Hartigan's Horse
- Griqualand West Ruiters
- Graaf-Reinet Ruiters
- First City Volunteers of Grahamstown
- Field Ambulance, 1st
- Cape Town Rifles
- Brand's O.V.S. Schutters
- Bechuanaland Rifles, 9th Dismounted Rifles
- Bechuanaland Rifles

Module code: South_West_Africa_1914_1915

=== South West Africa 1915 ===
Main article: South West Africa campaign

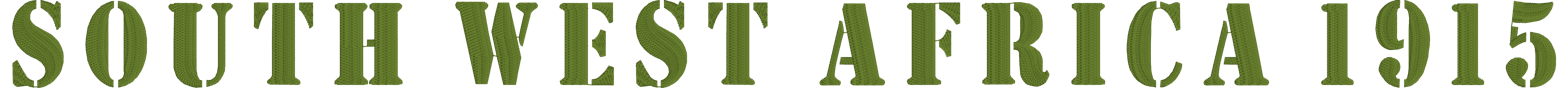
| South West Africa 1915 — Campaign honour for the 1915 conquest of German South West Africa by Union forces. |

==== Recipient units ====
- Southern Rifles
- Cape Town Highlanders, The Duke of Connaught and Strathearn's Own
- Cape Garrison Artillery
- Cape Field Artillery

Module code: South_West_Africa_1915

=== Gibeon ===
Main article: Battle of Gibeon

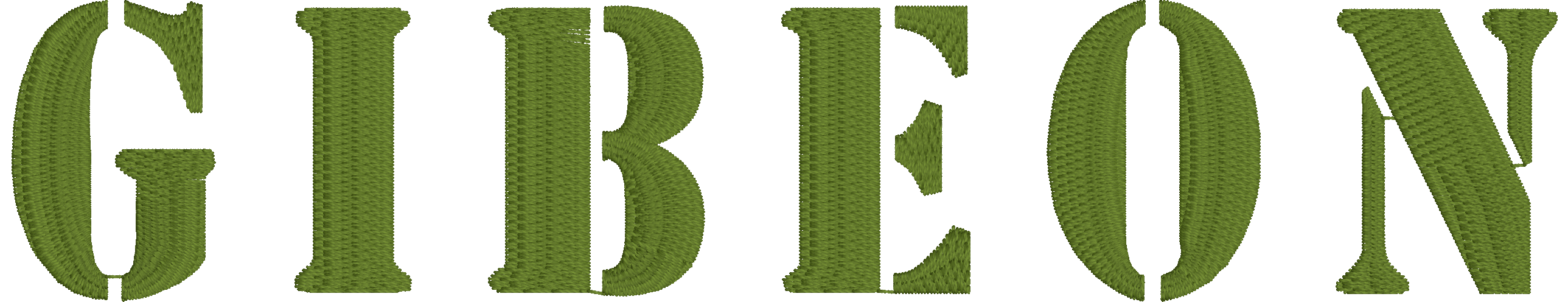
| Gibeon — Action at Gibeon (25 April 1915) during the South West Africa campaign, where Union mounted troops defeated a German force. |

==== Recipient units ====
- Umvoti Mounted Rifles
- Royal Natal Carbineers
- Natal Mounted Rifles
- Imperial Light Horse

Module code: Gibeon

== First World War — East Africa ==
=== East Africa 1916-17 ===
Main article: East African campaign (World War I)

| East Africa 1916-17 — East African theatre honour for Union units campaigning against German East Africa in 1916–17. |

==== Recipient units ====
- Cape Corps

Module code: East_Africa_1916_17

=== East Africa 1916-18 ===
Main article: East African campaign (World War I)

| East Africa 1916-18 — Broader East African theatre honour covering 1916–18 operations against German East Africa. |

==== Recipient units ====
- Transvaal Scottish Regiment
- South African Infantry Regiment, 9th (9 SAI)
- South African Infantry Regiment, 8th (8 SAI)
- South African Infantry Regiment, 7th (7 SAI)
- South African Infantry Regiment, 6th (6 SAI)
- South African Infantry Regiment, 5th (5 SAI)
- South African Infantry Regiment, 11th (11 SAI)
- South African Infantry Regiment, 10th (10 SAI)
- South African Cape Corps Service Battalion
- SA Horse, 9th (9th SAH)
- SA Horse, 8th (8th SAH)
- SA Horse, 4th (4th SAH)
- SA Horse, 3rd (3rd SAH)
- SA Horse, 10th (10th SAH)
- SA Field Ambulance, 5th
- SA Field Ambulance, 4th
- SA Field Ambulance, 3rd
- SA Field Ambulance, 2nd
- SA Field Ambulance, 1st
- S.A. Rifles
- Cape Corps

Module code: East_Africa_1916_18

=== German East Africa 1916-18 ===
Main article: East African campaign (World War I)

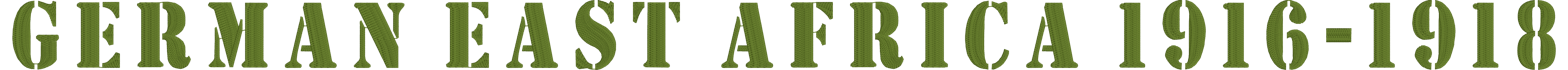
| German East Africa 1916-18 — Honour for service in German East Africa during the First World War East African campaign. |

==== Recipient units ====
- S.A. Police (1913–1994)

Module code: German_East_Africa_1916_18

=== Kilimanjaro ===
Main article: Battle of Kilimanjaro

| Kilimanjaro — Operations around Mount Kilimanjaro early in the East African campaign (1916). |

==== Recipient units ====
- South African Infantry Regiment, 9th (9 SAI)
- South African Infantry Regiment, 8th (8 SAI)
- South African Infantry Regiment, 7th (7 SAI)
- South African Infantry Regiment, 6th (6 SAI)
- South African Infantry Regiment, 5th (5 SAI)
- South African Infantry Regiment, 11th (11 SAI)
- South African Infantry Regiment, 10th (10 SAI)
- South African Cape Corps Service Battalion
- SA Horse, 3rd (3rd SAH)
- SA Field Ambulance, 5th
- SA Field Ambulance, 4th
- SA Field Ambulance, 3rd
- SA Field Ambulance, 2nd
- SA Field Ambulance, 1st
- Cape Corps

Module code: Kilimanjaro

=== Behobeho ===
| Behobeho — Action at Behobeho during the East African campaign against German colonial forces. |

==== Recipient units ====
- South African Infantry Regiment, 7th (7 SAI)
- South African Infantry Regiment, 6th (6 SAI)
- South African Cape Corps Service Battalion
- Cape Corps

Module code: Behobeho

=== East Africa 1917-18 ===
Main article: East African campaign (World War I)

| East Africa 1917-18 — East African theatre honour for the later 1917–18 phase of the campaign. |

==== Recipient units ====
- Cape Corps

Module code: East_Africa_1917_18

=== Narungombe ===
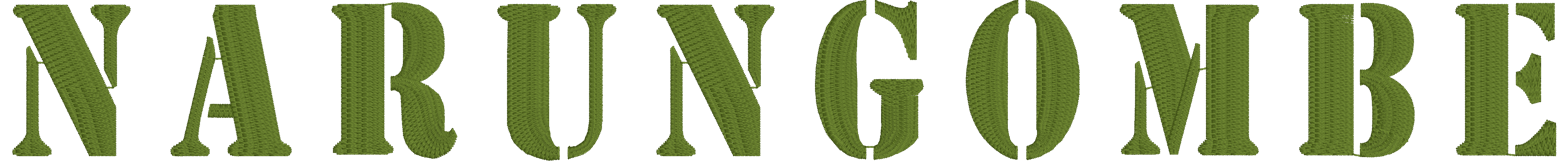
| Narungombe — Fighting at Narungombe in German East Africa during 1917. |

==== Recipient units ====
- South African Infantry Regiment, 8th (8 SAI)
- South African Infantry Regiment, 7th (7 SAI)

Module code: Narungombe

=== Nyangao ===
Main article: Battle of Nyangao

| Nyangao — Battle of Nyangao (October 1917) in the East African campaign. |

==== Recipient units ====
- South African Infantry Regiment, 8th (8 SAI)
- South African Infantry Regiment, 7th (7 SAI)
- South African Cape Corps Service Battalion
- SA Horse, 10th (10th SAH)
- Cape Corps

Module code: Nyangao

== First World War — Western Front ==
=== France and Flanders 1916-18 ===
Main article: Western Front (World War I)

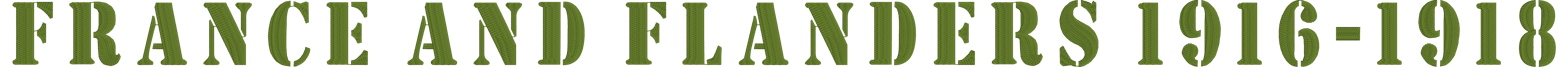
| France and Flanders 1916-18 — Theatre honour for South African service on the Western Front in France and Flanders, 1916–18. |

==== Recipient units ====
- South African Field Ambulance, 1st

Module code: France_and_Flanders_1916_18

=== Delville Wood ===
Main article: Battle of Delville Wood

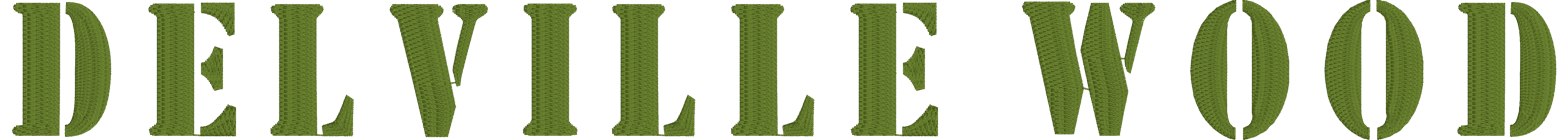
| Delville Wood — Defence and fighting in Delville Wood (July 1916) by the 1st South African Infantry Brigade on the Somme. |

==== Recipient units ====
- South African Field Ambulance, 1st

Module code: Delville_Wood

=== Somme 1916 ===
Main article: Battle of the Somme

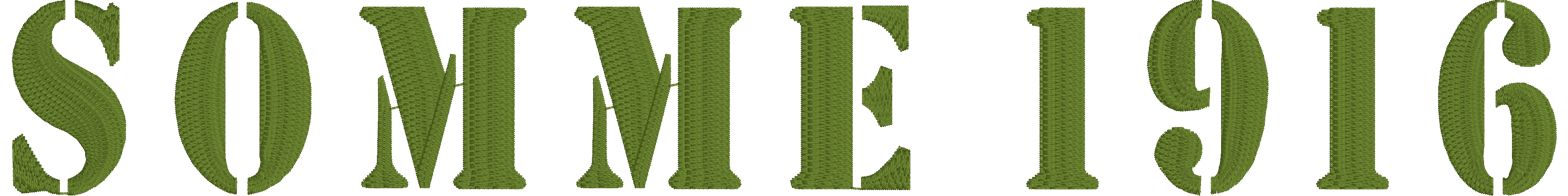
| Somme 1916 — South African Brigade fighting on the Somme in 1916, including the July battles around Longueval and Delville Wood. |

==== Recipient units ====
- South African Field Ambulance, 1st

Module code: Somme_1916

=== Le Transloy ===
Main article: Battle of Le Transloy

| Le Transloy — Operations in the Le Transloy sector during the later Somme fighting of autumn 1916. |

==== Recipient units ====
- Cape Town Highlanders

Module code: Le_Transloy

=== Arras ===
Main article: Battle of Arras (1917)

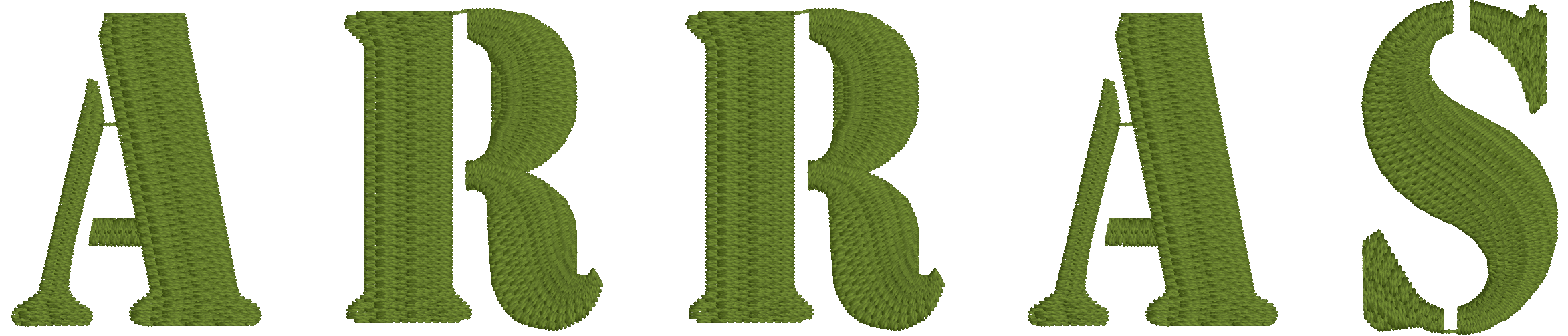
| Arras — South African participation in the Battle of Arras (April 1917) on the Western Front. |

==== Recipient units ====
- South African Field Ambulance, 1st

Module code: Arras

=== Scarpe 1917 ===
Main article: Battle of the Scarpe (1917)

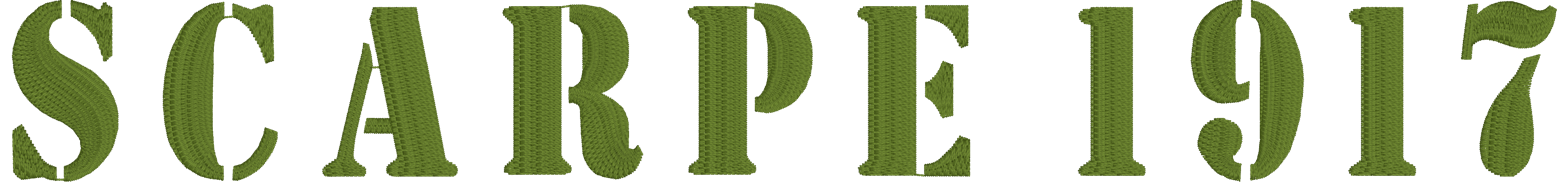
| Scarpe 1917 — Fighting along the Scarpe during the Arras offensive of 1917. |

==== Recipient units ====
- South African Field Ambulance, 1st

Module code: Scarpe_1917

=== Ypres 1917 ===
Main article: Battle of Passchendaele

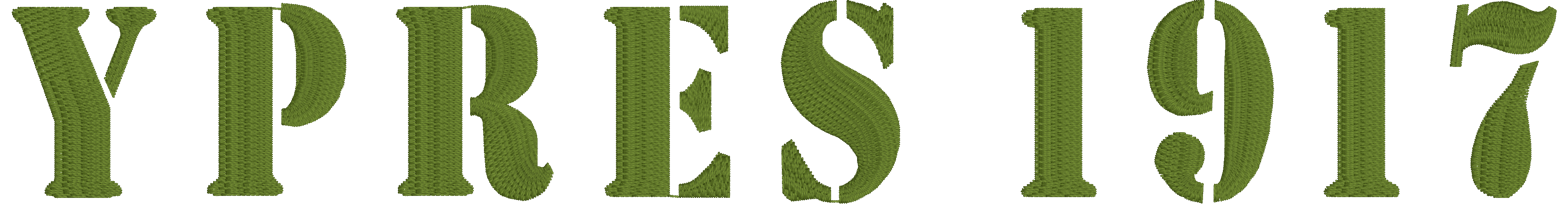
| Ypres 1917 — Third Battle of Ypres (Passchendaele) operations involving South African units in 1917. |

==== Recipient units ====
- South African Field Ambulance, 1st

Module code: Ypres_1917

=== Menin Road ===
Main article: Battle of the Menin Road Ridge

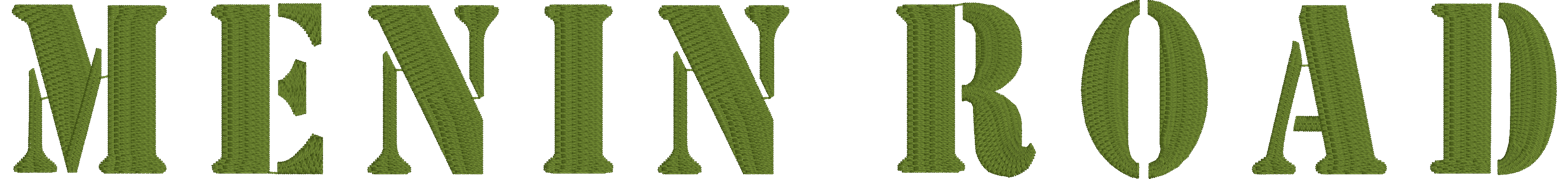
| Menin Road — Battle of the Menin Road Ridge (September 1917) during the Ypres offensive. |

==== Recipient units ====
- South African Field Ambulance, 1st

Module code: Menin_Road

=== France and Flanders 1918 ===
Main article: Western Front (World War I)

| France and Flanders 1918 — Theatre honour focused on Western Front operations in 1918. |

==== Recipient units ====
- Cape Town Highlanders

Module code: France_and_Flanders_1918

=== Kemmel ===
Main article: Battle of the Lys (1918)

| Kemmel — Fighting for the Kemmelberg / Mount Kemmel area during the Lys battles of 1918. |

==== Recipient units ====
- Cape Town Highlanders

Module code: Kemmel

=== Lys ===
Main article: Battle of the Lys (1918)

| Lys — Battle of the Lys (April 1918) during the German spring offensive in Flanders. |

==== Recipient units ====
- Cape Town Highlanders

Module code: Lys

=== Messines 1918 ===
Main article: Battle of Messines (1918)

| Messines 1918 — Actions around Messines during the German spring offensives and Allied responses of 1918. |

==== Recipient units ====
- Cape Town Highlanders

Module code: Messines_1918

=== Hindenburg Line ===
Main article: Hindenburg Line

| Hindenburg Line — Assaults on the Hindenburg Line during the Hundred Days Offensive of 1918. |

==== Recipient units ====
- Cape Town Highlanders

Module code: Hindenburg_Line

=== Cambrai 1918 ===
Main article: Battle of Cambrai (1918)

| Cambrai 1918 — Battle of Cambrai (October 1918) in the final Allied advance in France. |

==== Recipient units ====
- Cape Town Highlanders

Module code: Cambrai_1918

=== Selle ===
Main article: Battle of the Selle

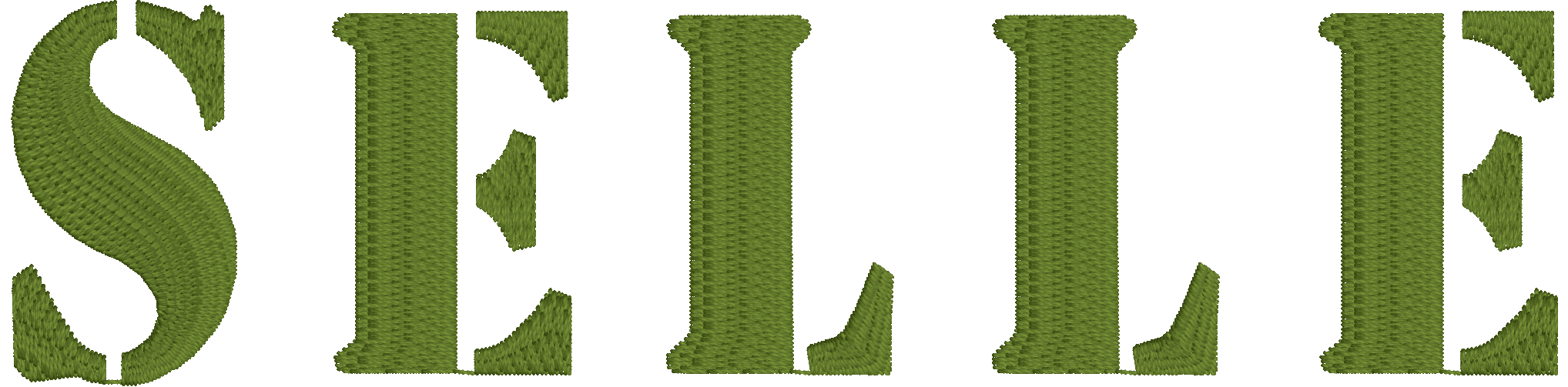
| Selle — Crossing of the Selle and related operations in October 1918. |

==== Recipient units ====
- South African Field Ambulance, 1st

Module code: Selle

=== Pursuit to Mons ===
Main article: Hundred Days Offensive

| Pursuit to Mons — Final advance toward Mons in November 1918 during the Hundred Days Offensive. |

==== Recipient units ====
- Cape Town Highlanders

Module code: Pursuit_to_Mons

=== Sambre ===
Main article: Battle of the Sambre (1918)

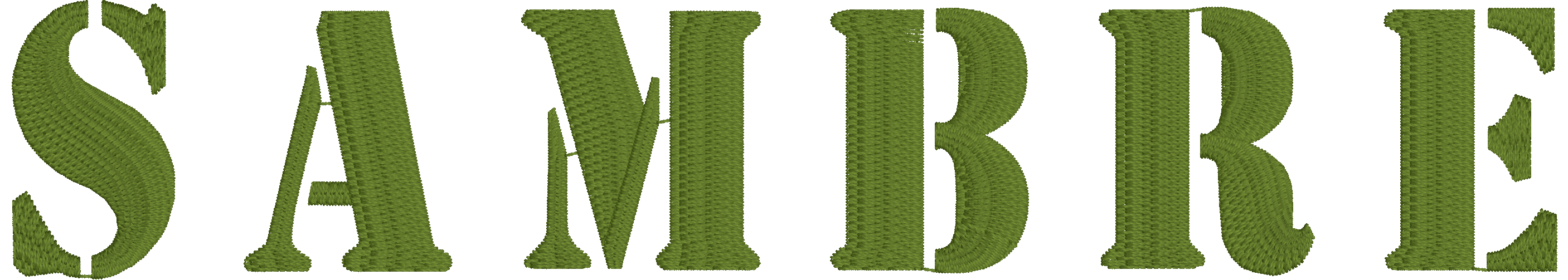
| Sambre — Battle of the Sambre (4 November 1918) near the end of the war on the Western Front. |

==== Recipient units ====
- South African Field Ambulance, 1st

Module code: Sambre

== First World War — Egypt and Palestine ==
=== Egypt 1916 ===
Main article: Sinai and Palestine campaign

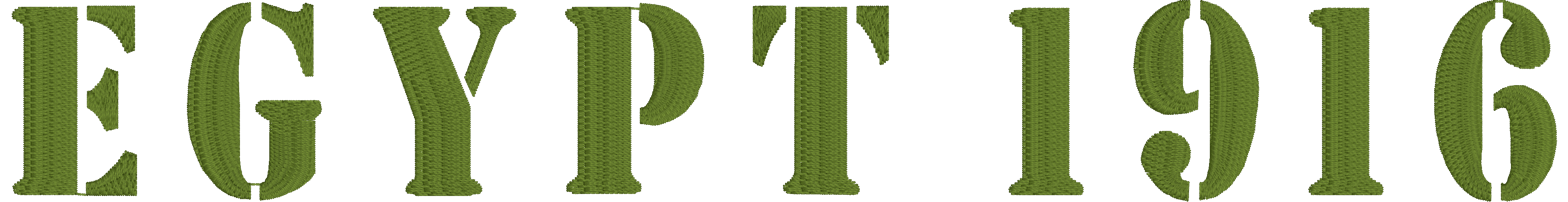
| Egypt 1916 — Service in Egypt in 1916 during the Sinai and Palestine campaigns. |

==== Recipient units ====
- South African Field Ambulance, 1st

Module code: Egypt_1916

=== Gaza ===
Main article: Battle of Gaza (1917)

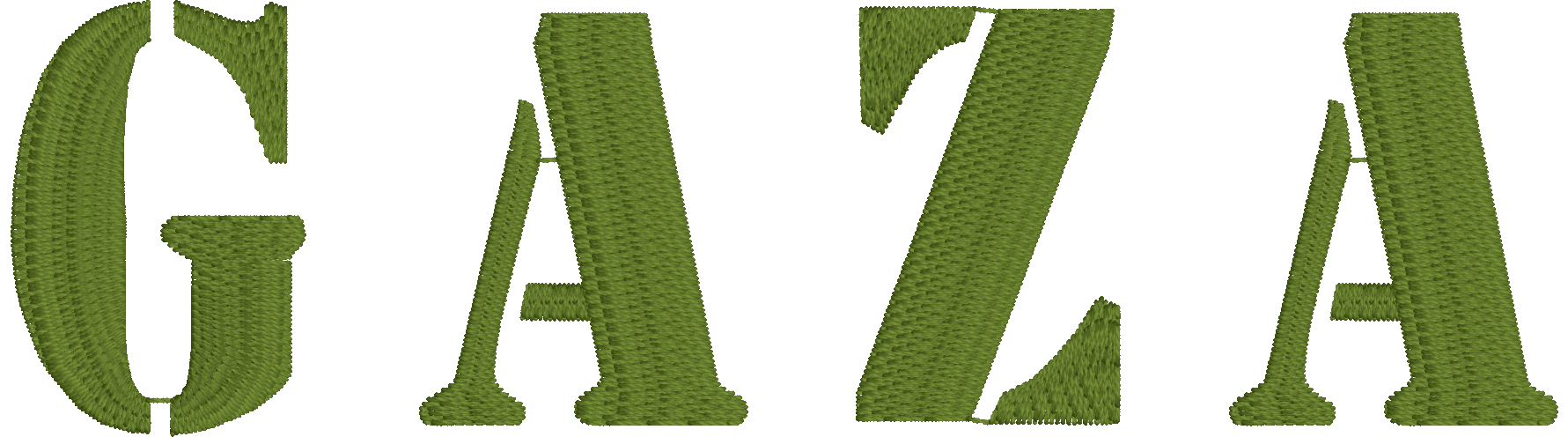
| Gaza — Battles for Gaza (1917) in the Sinai and Palestine campaign. |

==== Recipient units ====
- SA Field Ambulance, 4th
- SA Field Ambulance, 2nd
- SA Field Ambulance, 1st

Module code: Gaza

=== El Mughar ===
Main article: Battle of Mughar Ridge

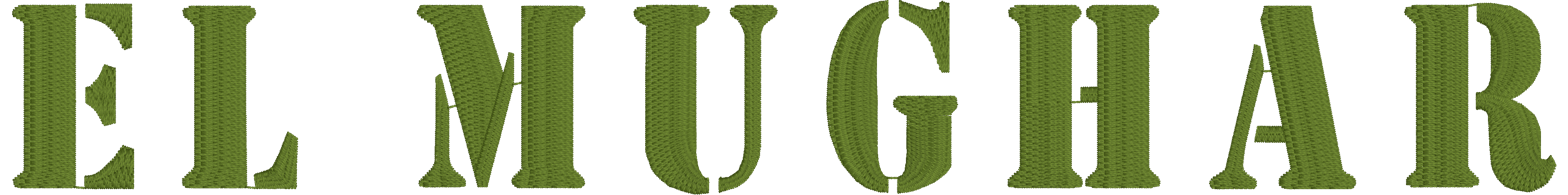
| El Mughar — Battle of Mughar Ridge (November 1917) during the advance into Palestine. |

==== Recipient units ====
- SA Field Ambulance, 4th
- SA Field Ambulance, 2nd
- SA Field Ambulance, 1st

Module code: El_Mughar

=== Nebi Samwil ===
Main article: Battle of Nebi Samwil

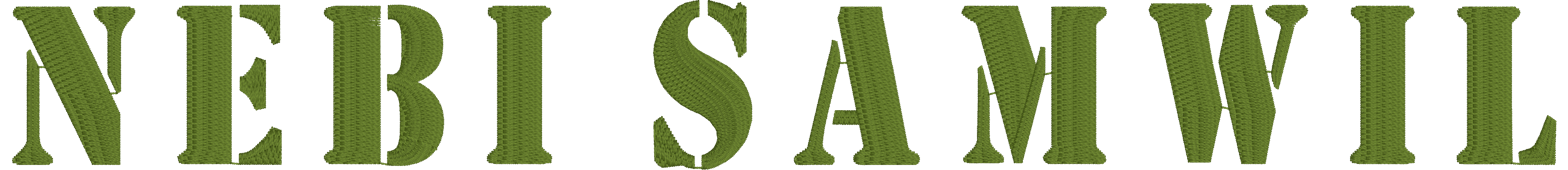
| Nebi Samwil — Fighting at Nebi Samwil during the 1917 Jerusalem operations. |

==== Recipient units ====
- SA Field Ambulance, 4th
- SA Field Ambulance, 2nd
- SA Field Ambulance, 1st

Module code: Nebi_Samwil

=== Palestine 1918 ===
Main article: Sinai and Palestine campaign

| Palestine 1918 — Theatre honour for Palestine operations in 1918. |

==== Recipient units ====
- South African Cape Corps Service Battalion
- SA Field Ambulance, 5th
- SA Field Ambulance, 4th
- SA Field Ambulance, 3rd
- SA Field Ambulance, 2nd
- SA Field Ambulance, 1st
- Cape Corps

Module code: Palestine_1918

=== Tel Asur ===
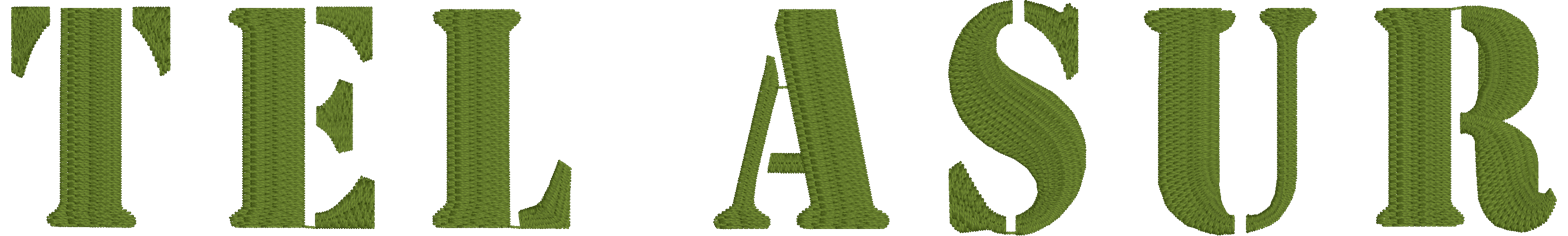
| Tel Asur — Operations at Tel Asur in Palestine in March 1918. |

==== Recipient units ====
- SA Field Ambulance, 5th
- SA Field Ambulance, 4th
- SA Field Ambulance, 3rd
- SA Field Ambulance, 2nd
- SA Field Ambulance, 1st

Module code: Tel_Asur

=== Megiddo ===
Main article: Battle of Megiddo (1918)

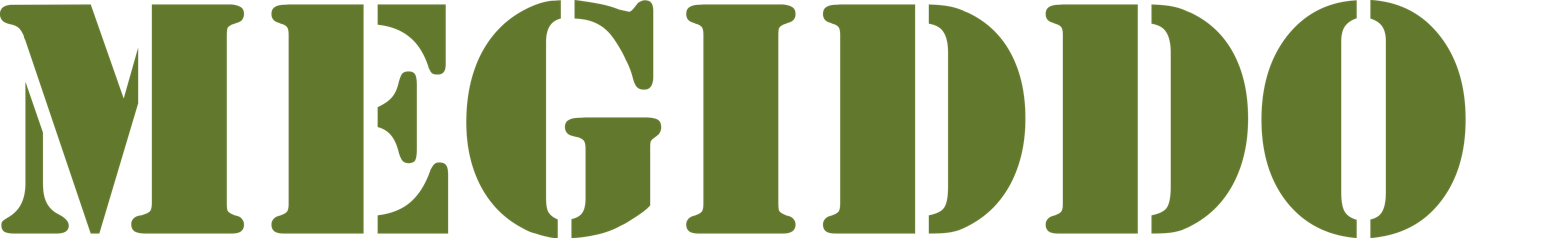
| Megiddo — Battle of Megiddo (September 1918), the decisive Allied offensive in Palestine. |

==== Recipient units ====
- South African Cape Corps Service Battalion
- Cape Corps

Module code: Megiddo

=== Nablus ===
Main article: Battle of Nablus (1918)

| Nablus — Advance on Nablus during the September 1918 Palestine offensive. |

==== Recipient units ====
- South African Cape Corps Service Battalion
- Cape Corps

Module code: Nablus

=== Sharon ===
Main article: Battle of Sharon

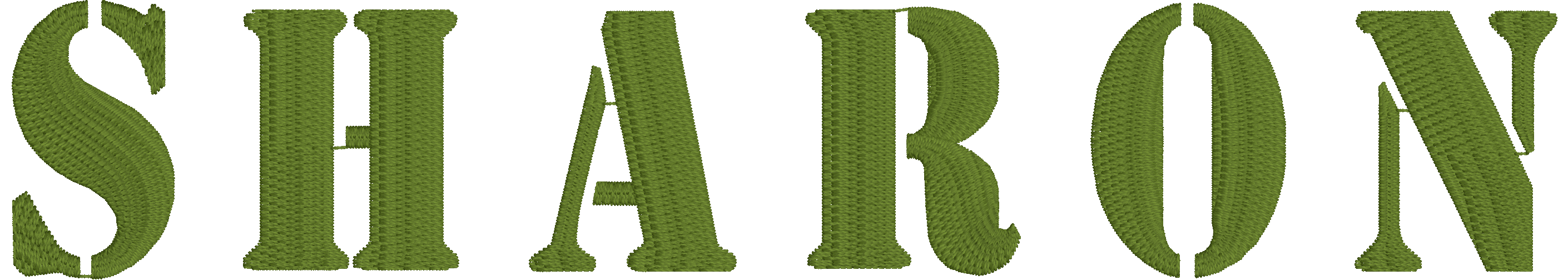
| Sharon — Battle of Sharon component of the Megiddo offensive (September 1918). |

==== Recipient units ====
- SA Field Ambulance, 5th
- SA Field Ambulance, 4th
- SA Field Ambulance, 3rd
- SA Field Ambulance, 2nd
- SA Field Ambulance, 1st

Module code: Sharon

== Second World War — East Africa ==
=== East Africa 1940-41 ===
Main article: East African campaign (World War II)

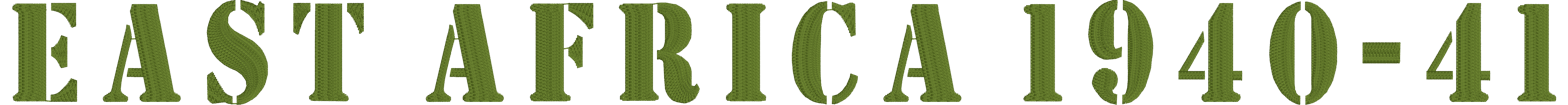
| East Africa 1940-41 — East African campaign of 1940–41 against Italian forces in Italian East Africa. |

==== Recipient units ====
- South African Irish Regiment
- Royal Natal Carbineers
- Regiment Vrystaat
- Regiment Christiaan Beyers
- Mapungubwe Regiment
- Regiment President Steyn
- Thaba Bosiu Armour Regiment
- Natal Mounted Rifles
- Cape Town Rifles

Module code: East_Africa_1940_41

=== El Wak ===
Main article: Battle of El Wak

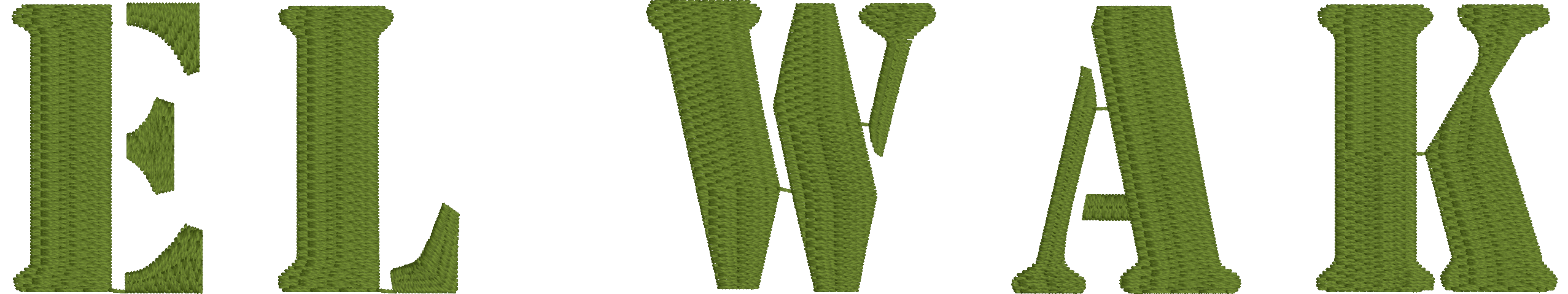
| El Wak — Raid and action at El Wak (December 1940) on the Kenya–Somalia frontier. |

==== Recipient units ====
- Transvaal Scottish Regiment
- Royal Natal Carbineers
- Cape Town Rifles

Module code: El_Wak

=== El Yibo ===
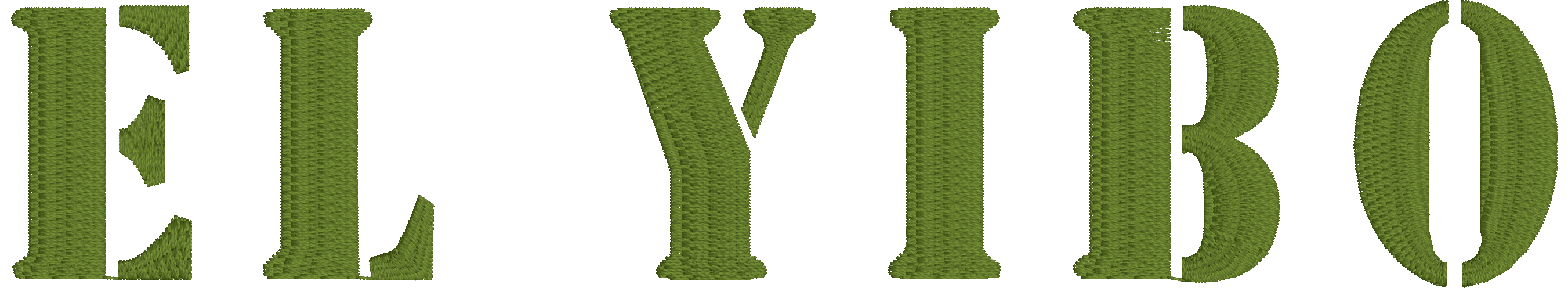
| El Yibo — East African honour for fighting at El Yibo during the 1941 advance. |

==== Recipient units ====
- Natal Mounted Rifles

Module code: El_Yibo

=== Mega ===
| Mega — Capture of Mega in southern Ethiopia during the 1941 East African campaign. |

==== Recipient units ====
- Transvaal Scottish Regiment
- South African Irish Regiment

Module code: Mega

=== The Juba ===
Main article: Italian Somaliland

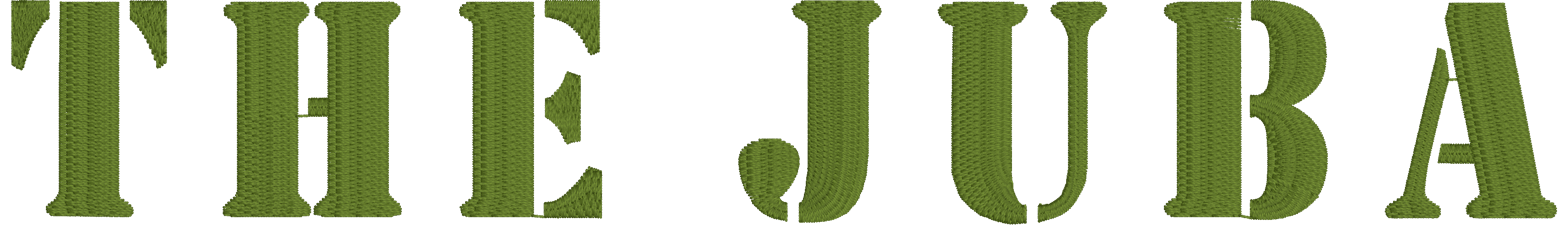
| The Juba — Operations along the Juba River during the advance through Italian Somaliland (1941). |

==== Recipient units ====
- Transvaal Scottish Regiment
- Royal Natal Carbineers
- Cape Town Rifles

Module code: The_Juba

=== Yonte ===
| Yonte — Action at Yonte during the East African campaign of 1941. |

==== Recipient units ====
- Transvaal Scottish Regiment

Module code: Yonte

=== Diredawa ===
Main article: Dire Dawa

| Diredawa — Occupation of Dire Dawa during the advance into Ethiopia (1941). |

==== Recipient units ====
- Transvaal Scottish Regiment

Module code: Diredawa

=== Combolcia ===
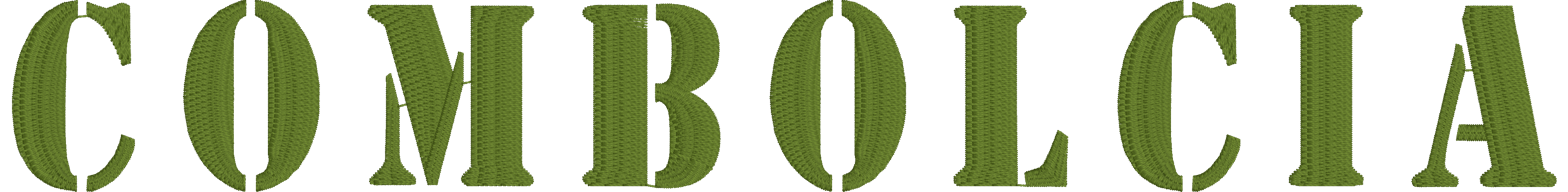
| Combolcia — Fighting at Combolcia during the Ethiopian campaign of 1941. |

==== Recipient units ====
- Transvaal Scottish Regiment
- Royal Natal Carbineers
- Cape Town Rifles

Module code: Combolcia

=== Amba Alagi ===
Main article: Battle of Amba Alagi (1941)

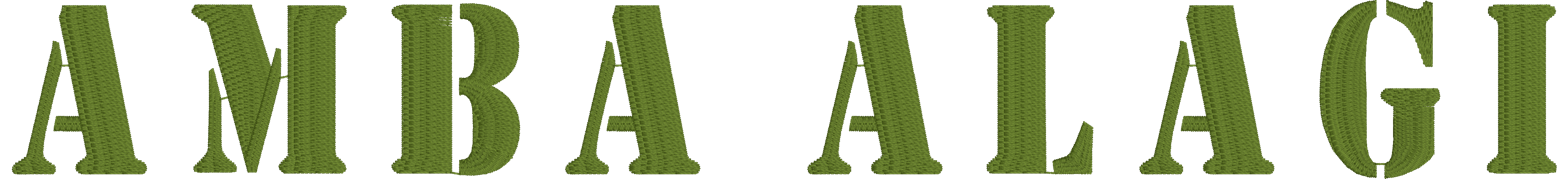
| Amba Alagi — Battle of Amba Alagi (May 1941), where Italian forces in Ethiopia surrendered to Allied troops including South Africans. |

==== Recipient units ====
- Transvaal Scottish Regiment
- Royal Natal Carbineers
- Cape Town Rifles

Module code: Amba_Alagi

== Second World War — Madagascar ==
=== Madagascar ===
Main article: Battle of Madagascar

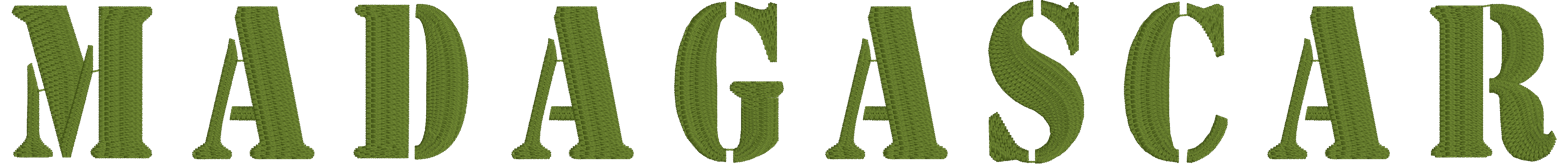
| Madagascar — Participation in the Allied invasion and occupation of Vichy-held Madagascar (1942). |

==== Recipient units ====
- Pretoria Regiment
- Pretoria Highlanders

Module code: Madagascar

=== Madagascar 1942 ===
Main article: Battle of Madagascar

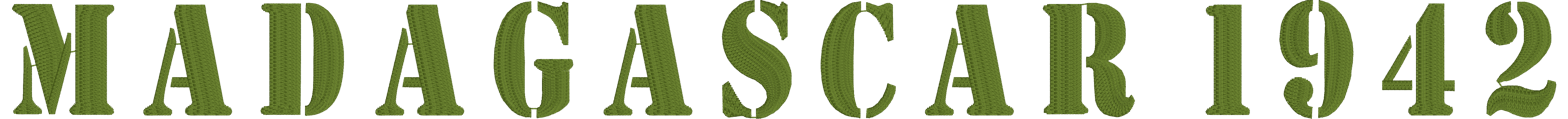
| Madagascar 1942 — Dated theatre honour for the 1942 Madagascar operations. Note: Commons filename uses historical misspelling Magagascar. |

==== Recipient units ====
- First City Volunteers of Grahamstown

Module code: Madagascar_1942

== Second World War — Western Desert ==
=== Bardia ===
Main article: Battle of Bardia

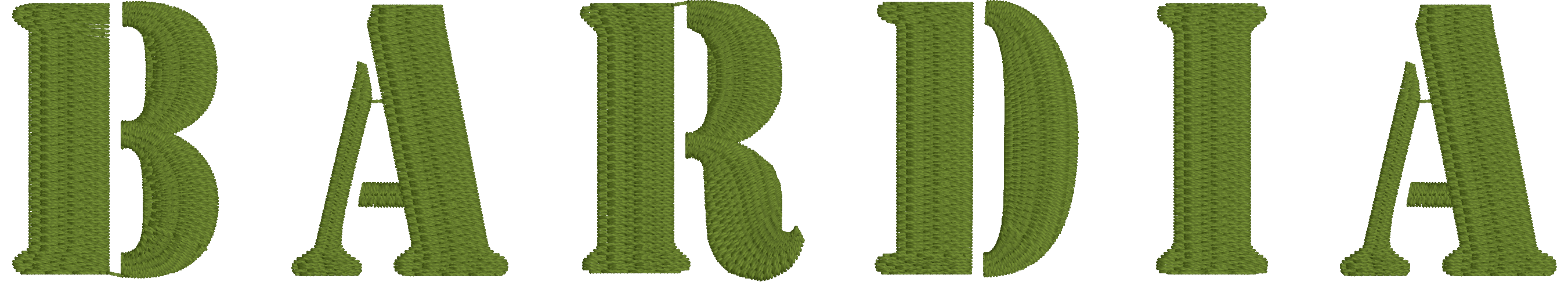
| Bardia — Assault on Bardia (January 1941 / later desert operations involving South African formations). |

==== Recipient units ====
- S.A. Police (1913–1994)
- Royal Durban Light Infantry
- Regiment Groot Karoo
- Rand Light Infantry
- Kaffrarian Rifle Volunteers
- Imperial Light Horse

Module code: Bardia

=== Sollum ===
Main article: Halfaya Pass

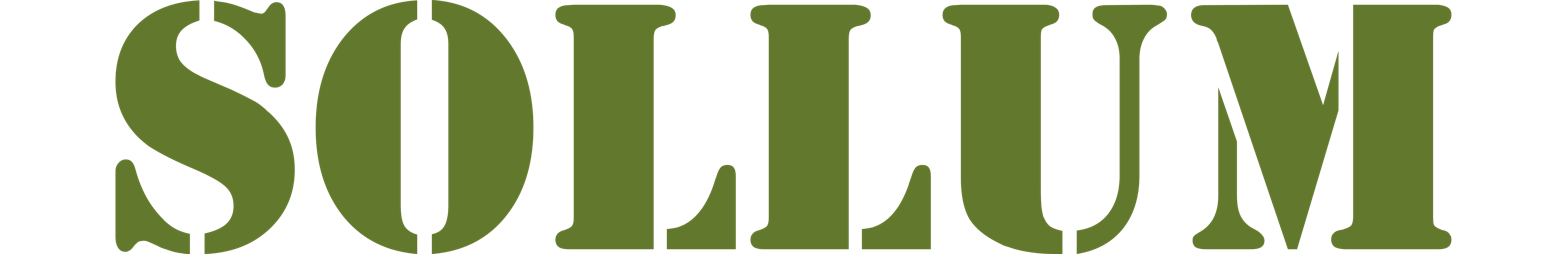
| Sollum — Operations around Sollum on the Egypt–Libya frontier during the desert war. |

==== Recipient units ====
- Transvaal Scottish Regiment
- S.A. Police (1913–1994)

Module code: Sollum

=== Western Desert 1941-43 ===
Main article: Western Desert campaign

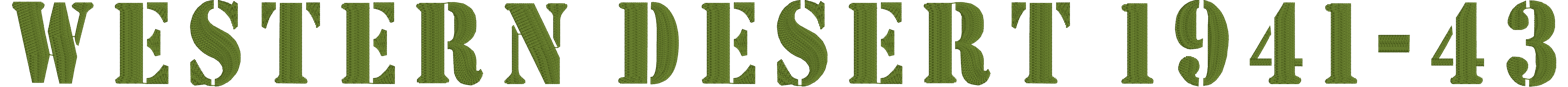
| Western Desert 1941-43 — Theatre honour for the Western Desert campaign in North Africa, 1941–43. |

==== Recipient units ====
- Umvoti Mounted Rifles
- Transvaal Scottish Regiment
- S.A. Police (1913–1994)
- South African Irish Regiment
- Royal Natal Carbineers
- Royal Durban Light Infantry
- Regiment Vrystaat
- Regiment Groot Karoo
- Regiment Christiaan Beyers
- Mapungubwe Regiment
- Rand Light Infantry
- Regiment President Steyn
- Thaba Bosiu Armour Regiment
- Natal Mounted Rifles
- Kaffrarian Rifle Volunteers
- Imperial Light Horse
- Cape Town Rifles
- Cape Town Highlanders, The Duke of Connaught and Strathearn's Own

Module code: Western_Desert_1941_43

=== Halfaya ===
Main article: Halfaya Pass

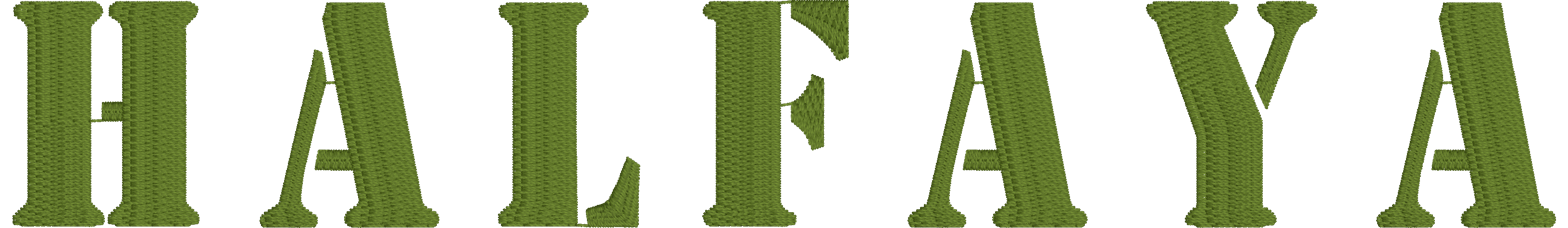
| Halfaya — Fighting for Halfaya Pass (“Hellfire Pass”) on the frontier escarpment. |

==== Recipient units ====
- S.A. Police (1913–1994)

Module code: Halfaya

=== Point 204 ===
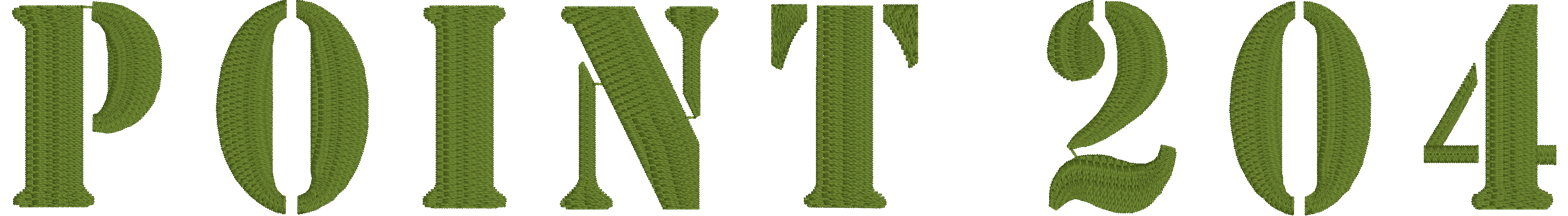
| Point 204 — Locality honour for Point 204 fighting in the Western Desert. |

==== Recipient units ====
- S.A. Police (1913–1994)
- Royal Natal Carbineers

Module code: Point_204

=== Sidi Rezegh ===
Main article: Battle of Sidi Rezegh

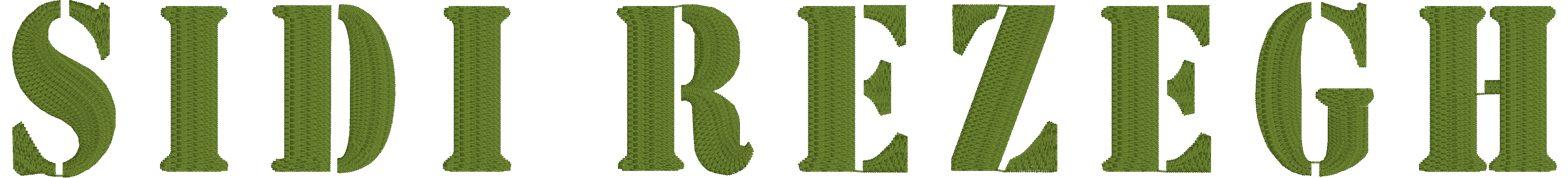
| Sidi Rezegh — Battle of Sidi Rezegh (November 1941) during Operation Crusader, costly for South African armour and infantry. |

==== Recipient units ====
- Transvaal Scottish Regiment
- South African Irish Regiment
- Royal Natal Carbineers
- Regiment Vrystaat
- Regiment Christiaan Beyers
- Mapungubwe Regiment
- Regiment President Steyn
- Thaba Bosiu Armour Regiment
- Cape Town Rifles

Module code: Sidi_Rezegh

=== Taieb el Essem ===
| Taieb el Essem — Western Desert action at Taieb el Essem during the Crusader period. |

==== Recipient units ====
- Royal Natal Carbineers

Module code: Taieb_el_Essem

=== Alem Hamza ===
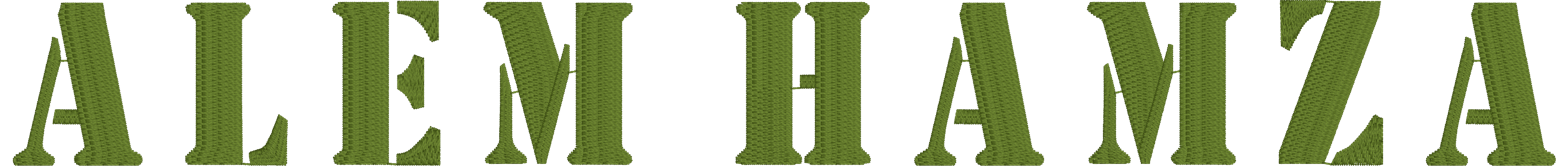
| Alem Hamza — Holding and fighting around Alem Hamza in the Gazala–Acroma area. |

==== Recipient units ====
- Transvaal Scottish Regiment
- Cape Town Highlanders, The Duke of Connaught and Strathearn's Own
- Cape Town Rifles

Module code: Alem_Hamza

=== Best Post ===
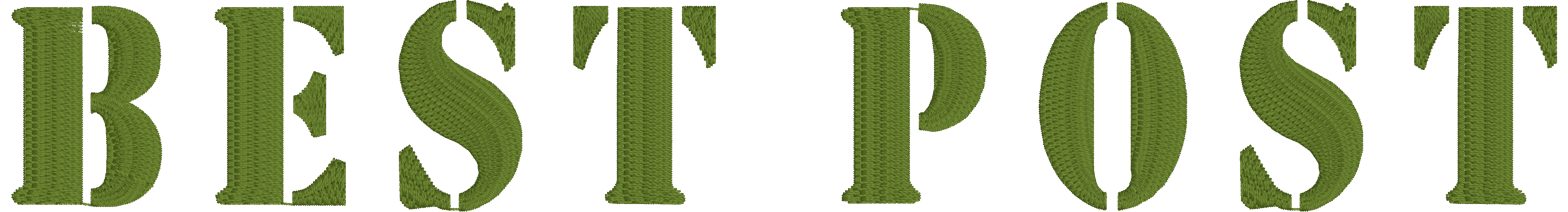
| Best Post — Defence of Best Post during Western Desert operations. |

==== Recipient units ====
- Natal Mounted Rifles
- Cape Town Highlanders, The Duke of Connaught and Strathearn's Own

Module code: Best_Post

=== Bir Sciafsciuf ===
| Bir Sciafsciuf — Desert engagement around Bir Sciafsciuf. |

==== Recipient units ====
- Royal Natal Carbineers

Module code: Bir_Sciafsciuf

=== Bir Temrad ===
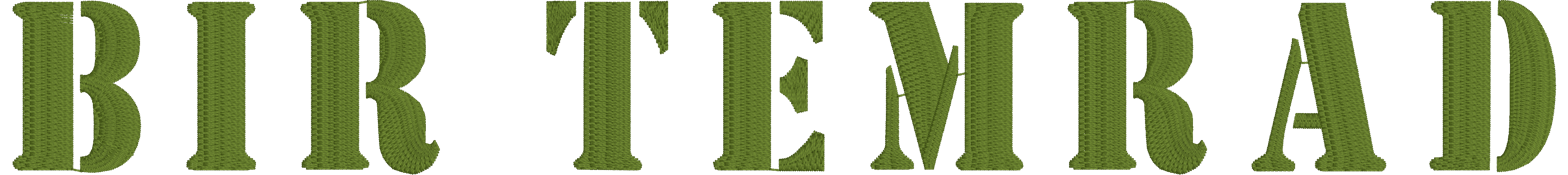
| Bir Temrad — Desert engagement around Bir Temrad. |

==== Recipient units ====
- Natal Mounted Rifles

Module code: Bir_Temrad

=== Gazala ===
Main article: Battle of Gazala

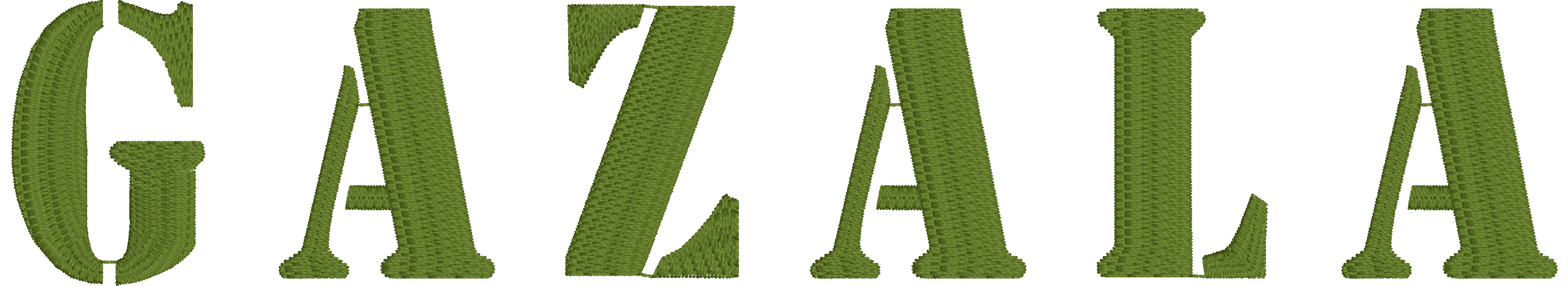
| Gazala — Battle of Gazala (May–June 1942), in which Axis forces broke the Allied Gazala Line west of Tobruk. |

==== Recipient units ====
- Transvaal Scottish Regiment
- S.A. Police (1913–1994)
- Royal Natal Carbineers
- Royal Durban Light Infantry
- Regiment Vrystaat
- Regiment Groot Karoo
- Regiment Christiaan Beyers
- Mapungubwe Regiment
- Rand Light Infantry
- Regiment President Steyn
- Thaba Bosiu Armour Regiment
- Natal Mounted Rifles
- Imperial Light Horse
- Cape Town Rifles
- Cape Town Highlanders, The Duke of Connaught and Strathearn's Own

Module code: Gazala

=== Acroma Keep ===
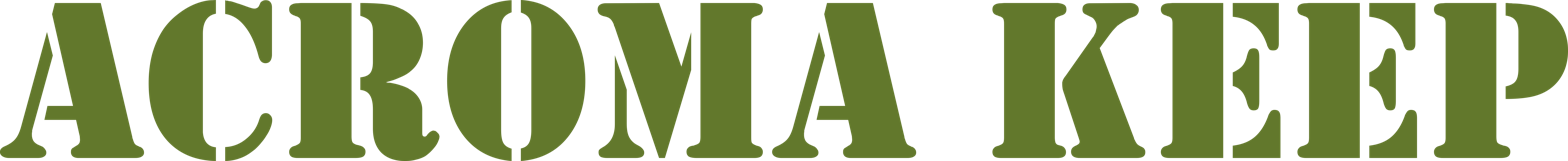
| Acroma Keep — Defence of the Acroma Keep locality during the Gazala battles. |

==== Recipient units ====
- Transvaal Scottish Regiment

Module code: Acroma_Keep

=== Commonwealth Keep ===
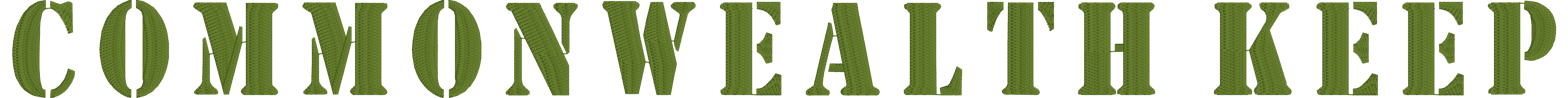
| Commonwealth Keep — Defence of Commonwealth Keep during the Gazala–Tobruk fighting. |

==== Recipient units ====
- S.A. Police (1913–1994)

Module code: Commonwealth_Keep

=== Dadaba ===
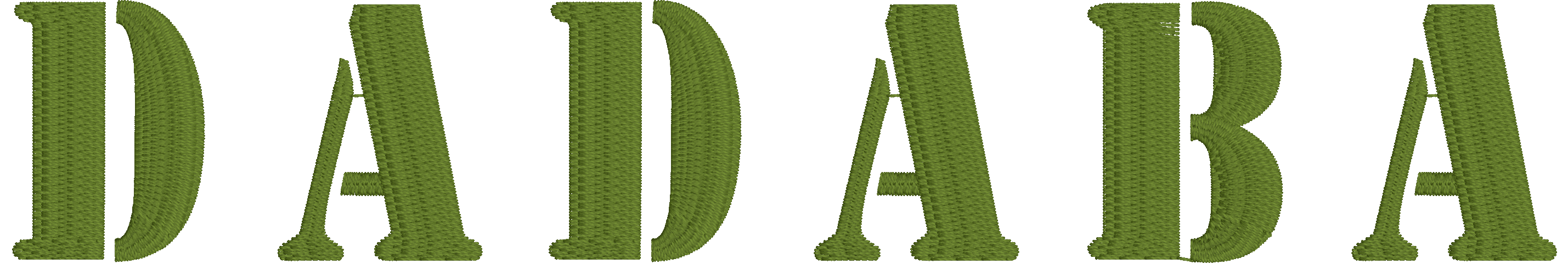
| Dadaba — Western Desert locality honour for Dadaba. |

==== Recipient units ====
- Natal Mounted Rifles

Module code: Dadaba

=== Mersa Belafarit ===
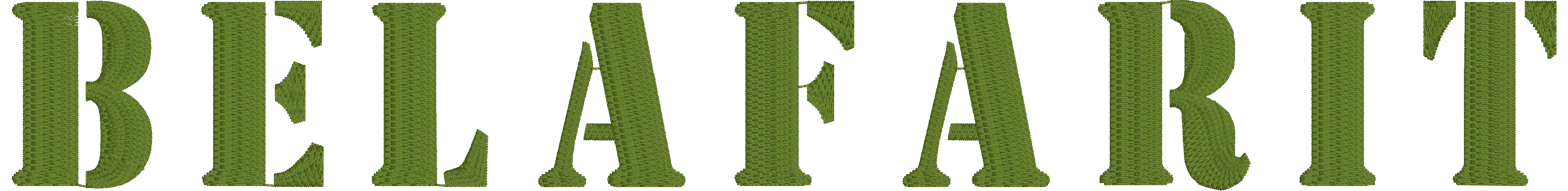
| Mersa Belafarit — Coastal desert action at Mersa Belafarit. |

==== Recipient units ====
- Imperial Light Horse

Module code: Mersa_Belafarit

=== Tobruk ===
Main article: Axis capture of Tobruk

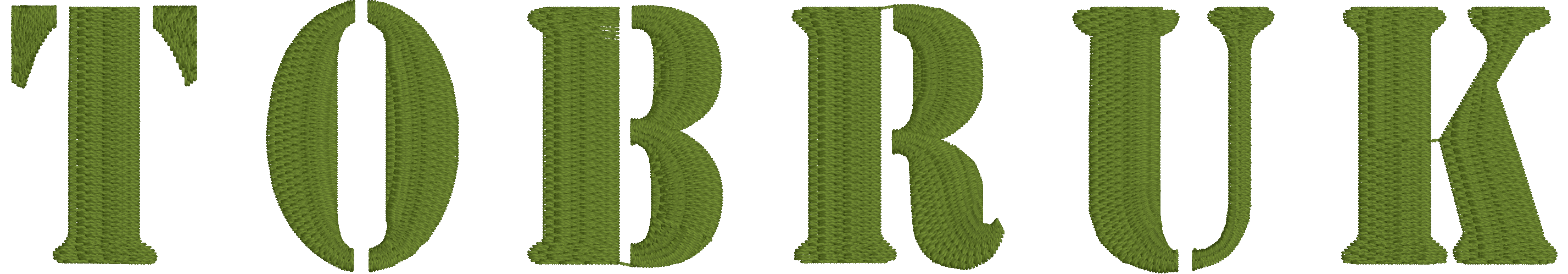
| Tobruk — Fall and related fighting around Tobruk in June 1942, including capture of the South African 2nd Division. |

==== Recipient units ====
- S.A. Police (1913–1994)

Module code: Tobruk

=== Alamein Box ===
Main article: First Battle of El Alamein

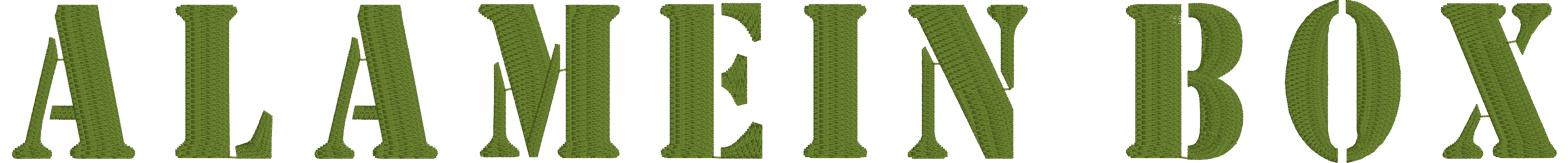
| Alamein Box — Defence of a box position in the Alamein line during the 1942 desert battles. |

==== Recipient units ====
- Royal Durban Light Infantry
- Imperial Light Horse
- Cape Town Highlanders, The Duke of Connaught and Strathearn's Own

Module code: Alamein_Box

=== Alamein Defence ===
Main article: First Battle of El Alamein

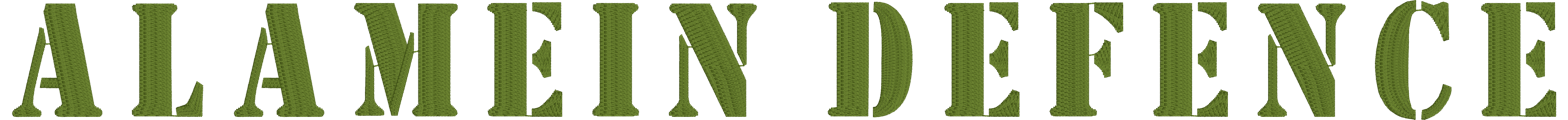
| Alamein Defence — Defensive fighting in the El Alamein line during mid-1942 (First Alamein period). |

==== Recipient units ====
- Transvaal Scottish Regiment
- Royal Natal Carbineers
- Royal Durban Light Infantry
- Regiment Vrystaat
- Regiment Groot Karoo
- Regiment Christiaan Beyers
- Mapungubwe Regiment
- Rand Light Infantry
- Regiment President Steyn
- Thaba Bosiu Armour Regiment
- Natal Mounted Rifles
- Imperial Light Horse
- Cape Town Rifles
- Cape Town Highlanders, The Duke of Connaught and Strathearn's Own

Module code: Alamein_Defence

=== Alem el Halfa ===
Main article: Battle of Alam el Halfa

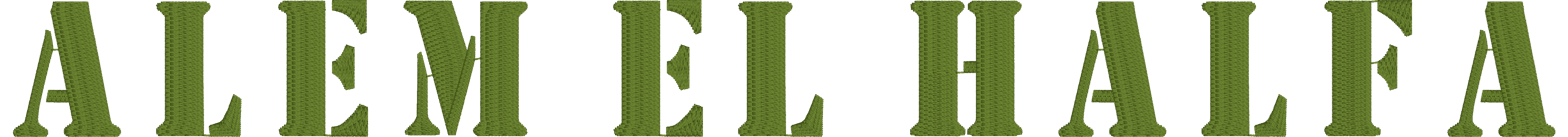
| Alem el Halfa — Battle of Alam el Halfa (August–September 1942), Rommel’s failed attempt to turn the Alamein position. |

==== Recipient units ====
- Cape Town Highlanders, The Duke of Connaught and Strathearn's Own

Module code: Alem_el_Halfa

=== Qattara Track ===
| Qattara Track — Operations along the Qattara Track on the southern Alamein flank. |

==== Recipient units ====
- Royal Natal Carbineers

Module code: Qattara_Track

=== Springbok Road ===
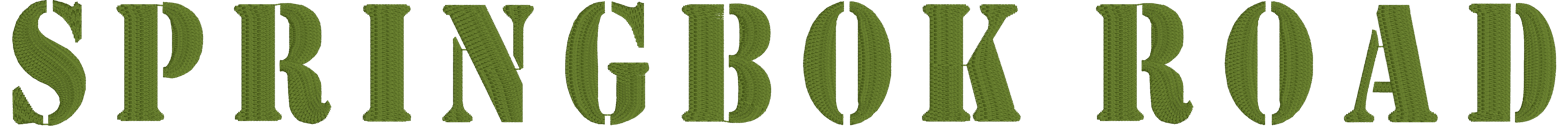
| Springbok Road — Locality honour for Springbok Road during the Alamein fighting. |

==== Recipient units ====
- Natal Mounted Rifles

Module code: Springbok_Road

=== El Alamein ===
Main article: Second Battle of El Alamein

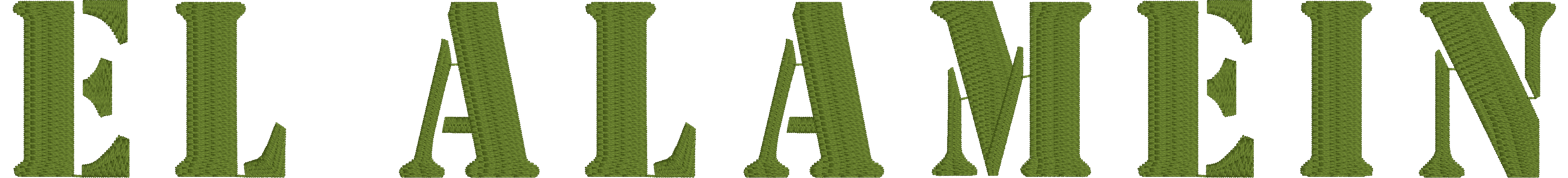
| El Alamein — Second Battle of El Alamein (October–November 1942), the decisive Allied victory in the Western Desert. |

==== Recipient units ====
- Transvaal Scottish Regiment
- Royal Natal Carbineers
- Royal Durban Light Infantry
- Regiment Vrystaat
- Regiment Groot Karoo
- Regiment Christiaan Beyers
- Mapungubwe Regiment
- Rand Light Infantry
- Regiment President Steyn
- Thaba Bosiu Armour Regiment
- Natal Mounted Rifles
- Imperial Light Horse
- Cape Town Rifles
- Cape Town Highlanders, The Duke of Connaught and Strathearn's Own

Module code: El_Alamein

== Second World War — Italy ==
=== Casino II ===
Main article: Battle of Monte Cassino

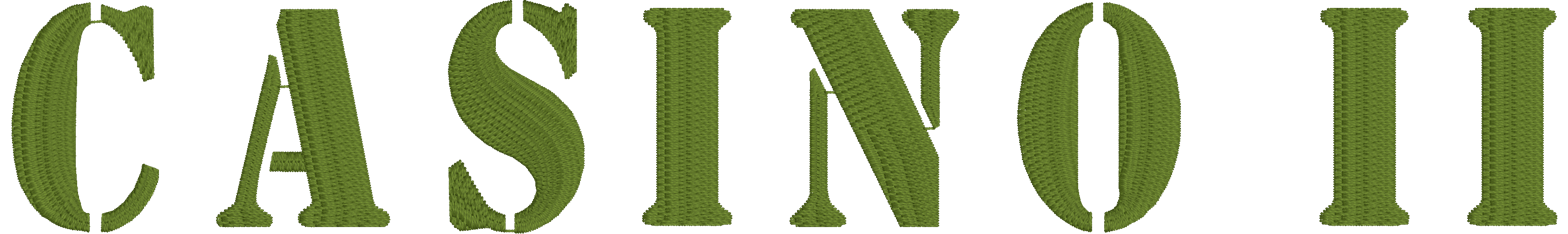
| Casino II — Second Cassino / Cassino II operations in the Liri Valley approach to Rome (1944). |

==== Recipient units ====
- Witwatersrand Rifles Regiment
- Royal Natal Carbineers
- Royal Durban Light Infantry
- Kimberley Volunteer Regiment
- Imperial Light Horse
- First City Volunteers of Grahamstown
- Regiment de la Rey
- Cape Town Highlanders, The Duke of Connaught and Strathearn's Own

Module code: Casino_II

=== Italy 1944-45 ===
Main article: Italian campaign (World War II)

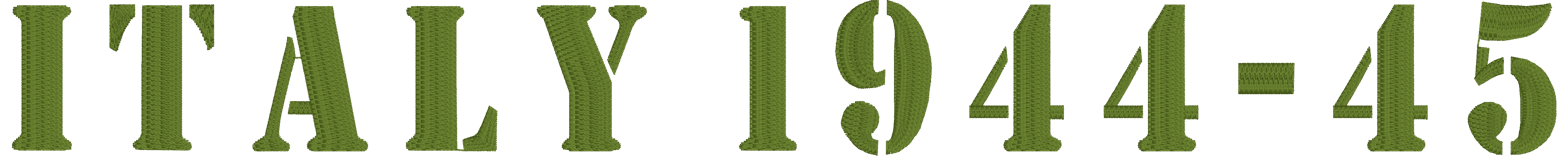
| Italy 1944-45 — Theatre honour for the Italian campaign of 1944–45, principally 6th South African Armoured Division. |

==== Recipient units ====
- Witwatersrand Rifles Regiment
- Special Service Battalion
- Royal Natal Carbineers
- Royal Durban Light Infantry
- Prince Alfred's Own Volunteer Guards
- Pretoria Regiment
- Natal Mounted Rifles
- Kimberley Volunteer Regiment
- Imperial Light Horse
- First City Volunteers of Grahamstown
- Regiment de la Rey
- Cape Town Highlanders, The Duke of Connaught and Strathearn's Own

Module code: Italy_1944_45

=== Allerona ===
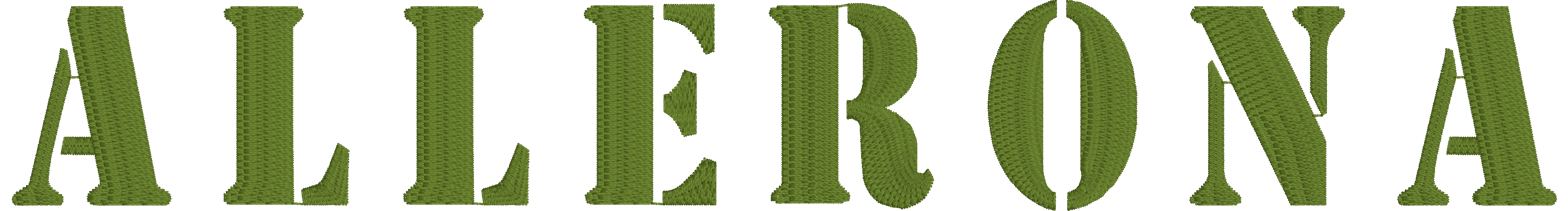
| Allerona — Action at Allerona in the Tiber valley advance. |

==== Recipient units ====
- Witwatersrand Rifles Regiment
- Regiment de la Rey

Module code: Allerona

=== Bagno Regio ===
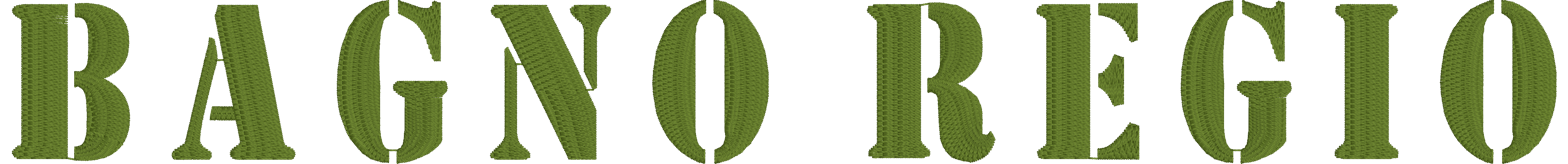
| Bagno Regio — Operations around Bagno Regio in central Italy. |

==== Recipient units ====
- Pretoria Regiment

Module code: Bagno_Regio

=== Celleno ===
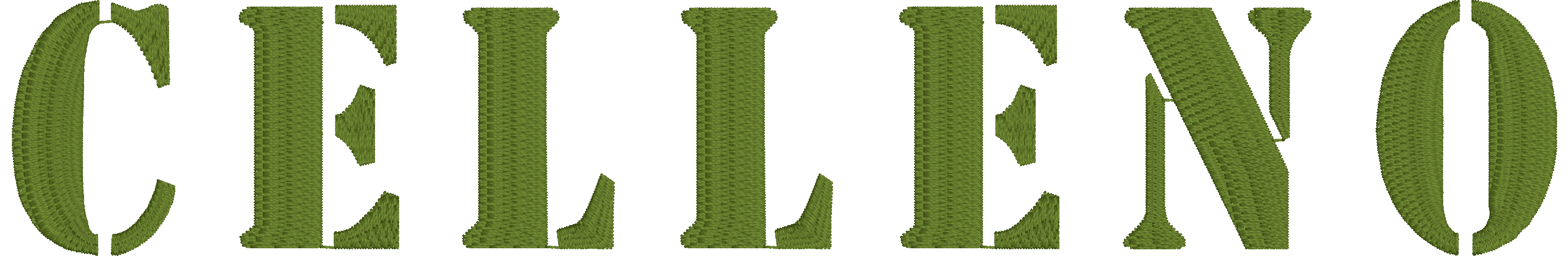
| Celleno — Fighting at Celleno during the 1944 Italian advance. |

==== Recipient units ====
- Special Service Battalion
- Prince Alfred's Own Volunteer Guards
- Natal Mounted Rifles
- Kimberley Volunteer Regiment
- Imperial Light Horse

Module code: Celleno

=== Chiusi ===
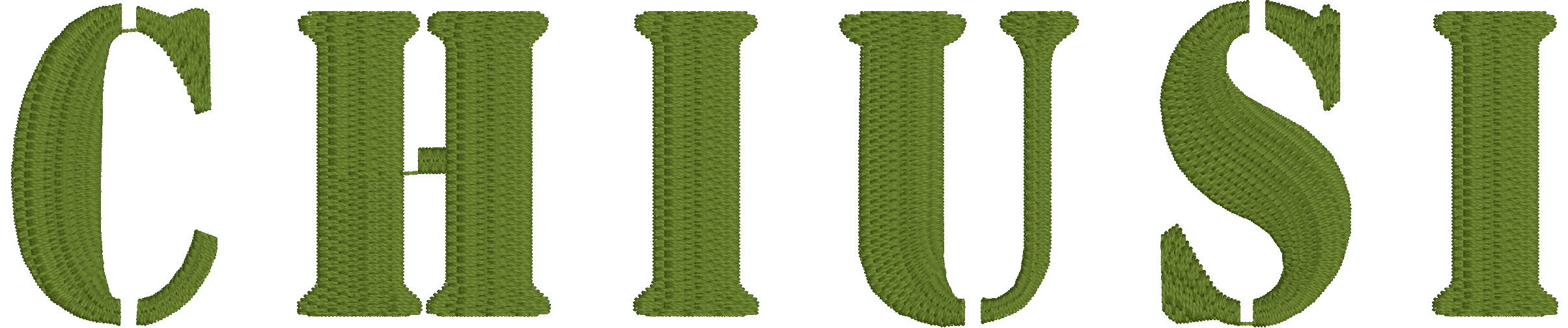
| Chiusi — Battle for Chiusi during the advance through Tuscany. |

==== Recipient units ====
- First City Volunteers of Grahamstown
- Cape Town Highlanders, The Duke of Connaught and Strathearn's Own

Module code: Chiusi

=== Citta delia Pieve ===
Main article: Città della Pieve

| Citta delia Pieve — Fighting for Città della Pieve during the advance toward Florence (spelling on the colour follows historical issue). Note: Issued spelling on colours; place is Città della Pieve. No dedicated section existed on the pre-overhaul list page. |

==== Recipient units ====
- Natal Carbineers

Module code: Citta_delia_Pieve

=== Paliano ===
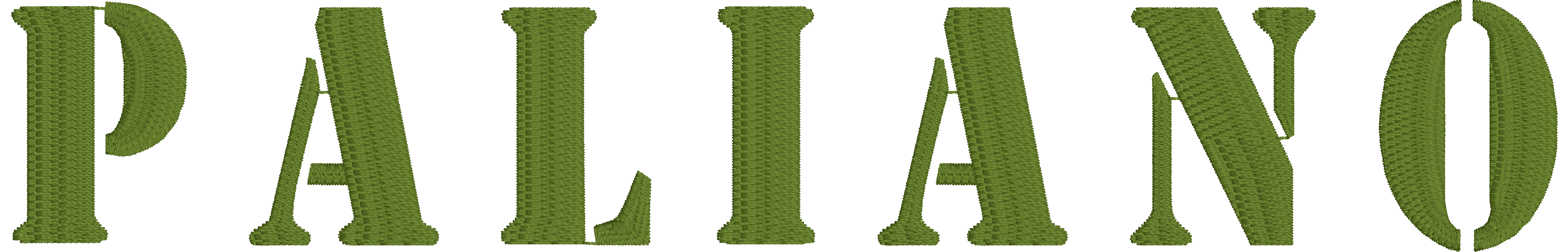
| Paliano — Action at Paliano during the advance north of Rome. |

==== Recipient units ====
- Cape Town Highlanders, The Duke of Connaught and Strathearn's Own

Module code: Paliano

=== Rome ===
Main article: Battle of Anzio

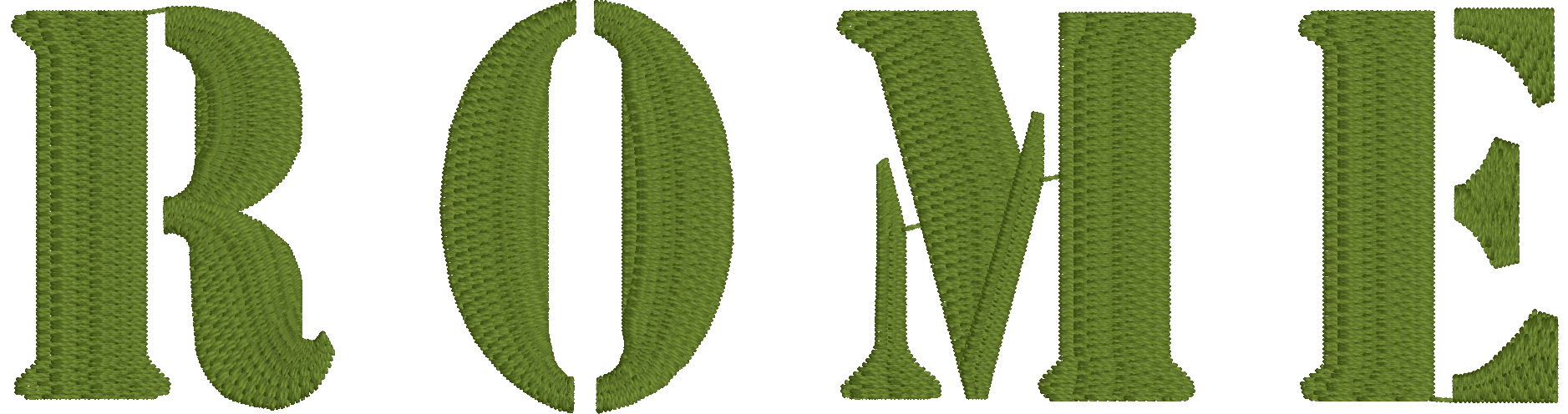
| Rome — Advance on and entry into Rome following the Cassino breakthrough (June 1944). |

==== Recipient units ====
No recipient units listed in module data.

Module code: Rome

=== Sarteano ===
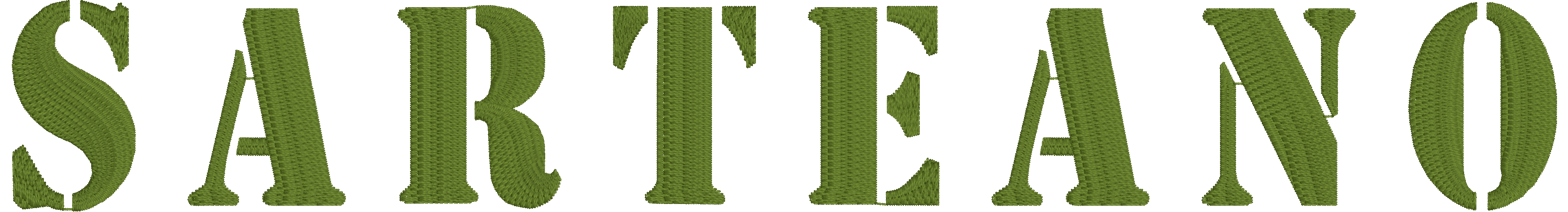
| Sarteano — Action at Sarteano in the Tuscan advance. |

==== Recipient units ====
- Pretoria Regiment

Module code: Sarteano

=== The Tiber ===
Main article: Tiber

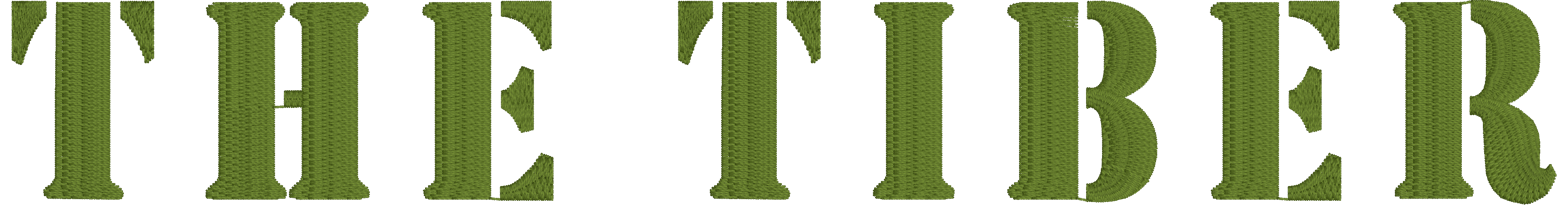
| The Tiber — Operations along the Tiber during the 1944 Italian campaign. |

==== Recipient units ====
- Natal Mounted Rifles

Module code: The_Tiber

=== La Foce ===
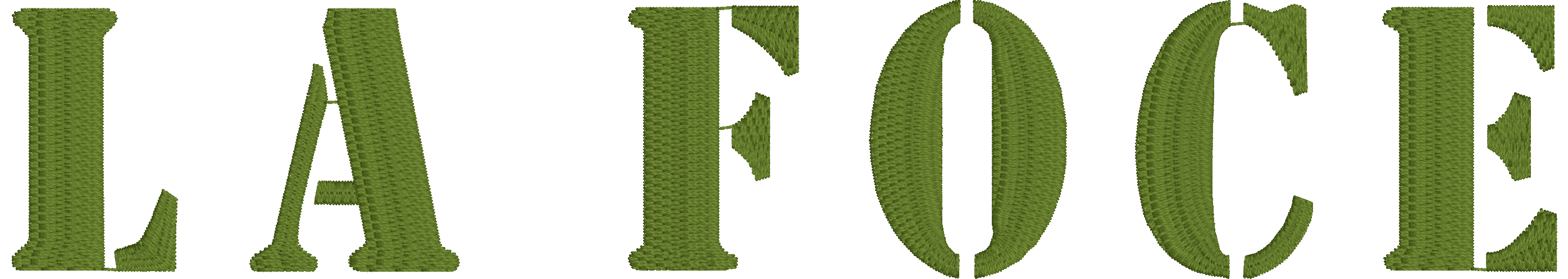
| La Foce — Fighting around La Foce during operations toward Florence. |

==== Recipient units ====
- Pretoria Regiment

Module code: La_Foce

=== The Greve ===
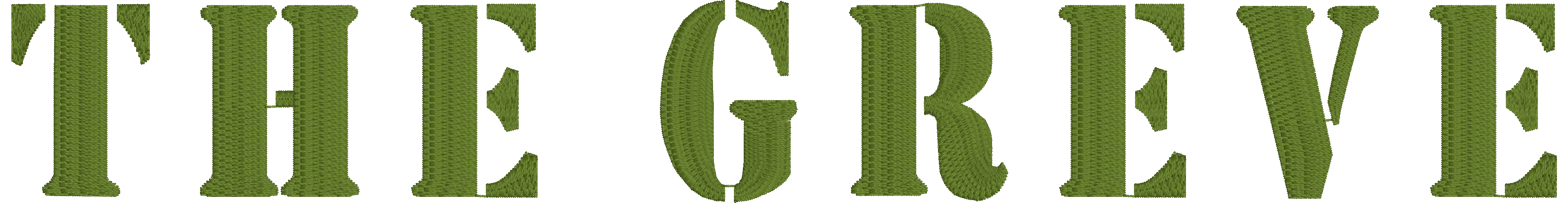
| The Greve — Crossing and fighting along the Greve during the advance on Florence. |

==== Recipient units ====
- Witwatersrand Rifles Regiment
- Special Service Battalion
- Royal Natal Carbineers
- Prince Alfred's Own Volunteer Guards
- Natal Mounted Rifles
- Kimberley Volunteer Regiment
- Imperial Light Horse
- First City Volunteers of Grahamstown
- Regiment de la Rey
- Cape Town Highlanders, The Duke of Connaught and Strathearn's Own

Module code: The_Greve

=== Campo Santo Bridge ===
| Campo Santo Bridge — Action at Campo Santo Bridge during Italian campaign operations. |

==== Recipient units ====
- Witwatersrand Rifles Regiment
- Regiment de la Rey

Module code: Campo_Santo_Bridge

=== Catarelto Ridge ===
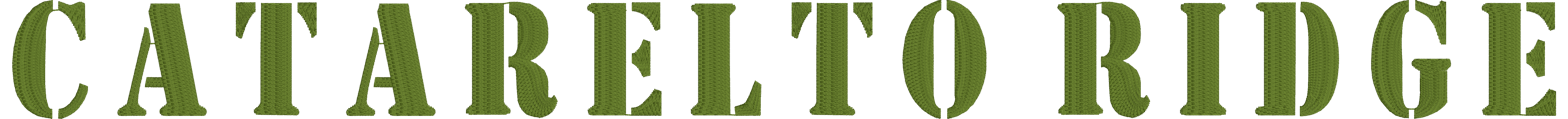
| Catarelto Ridge — Fighting on Catarelto Ridge in the approach to the Gothic Line. |

==== Recipient units ====
- Pretoria Regiment

Module code: Catarelto_Ridge

=== Florence ===
Main article: Gothic Line

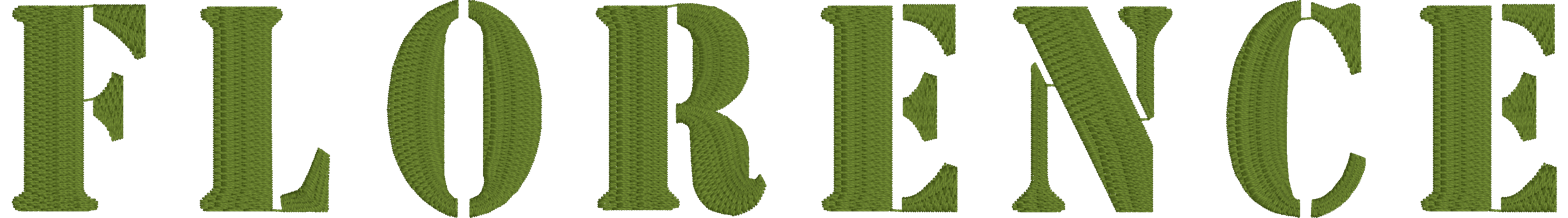
| Florence — Liberation and fighting around Florence in August 1944. |

==== Recipient units ====
- Witwatersrand Rifles Regiment
- Special Service Battalion
- Royal Natal Carbineers
- Royal Durban Light Infantry
- Prince Alfred's Own Volunteer Guards
- Pretoria Regiment
- Natal Mounted Rifles
- Kimberley Volunteer Regiment
- Imperial Light Horse
- First City Volunteers of Grahamstown
- Regiment de la Rey
- Cape Town Highlanders, The Duke of Connaught and Strathearn's Own

Module code: Florence

=== Gothic Line ===
Main article: Gothic Line

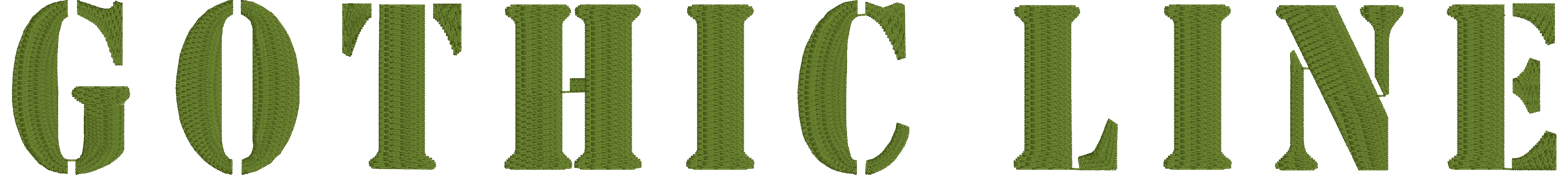
| Gothic Line — Assaults on the German Gothic Line in the northern Apennines (1944–45). |

==== Recipient units ====
- Witwatersrand Rifles Regiment
- Special Service Battalion
- Royal Natal Carbineers
- Royal Durban Light Infantry
- Prince Alfred's Own Volunteer Guards
- Pretoria Regiment
- Natal Mounted Rifles
- Kimberley Volunteer Regiment
- Imperial Light Horse
- First City Volunteers of Grahamstown
- Regiment de la Rey
- Cape Town Highlanders, The Duke of Connaught and Strathearn's Own

Module code: Gothic_Line

=== Monte Fili ===
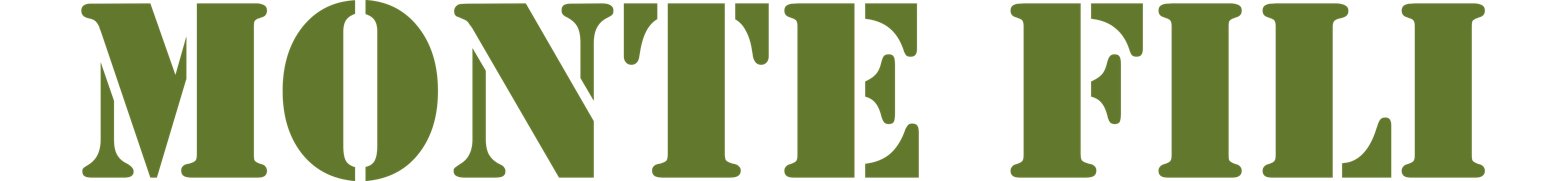
| Monte Fili — Action at Monte Fili during the Gothic Line battles. |

==== Recipient units ====
- Witwatersrand Rifles Regiment
- Regiment de la Rey

Module code: Monte_Fili

=== Monte Querciabella ===
| Monte Querciabella — Mountain fighting at Monte Querciabella on the Gothic Line approaches. |

==== Recipient units ====
- Witwatersrand Rifles Regiment
- Regiment de la Rey

Module code: Monte_Querciabella

=== Monte Pezza ===
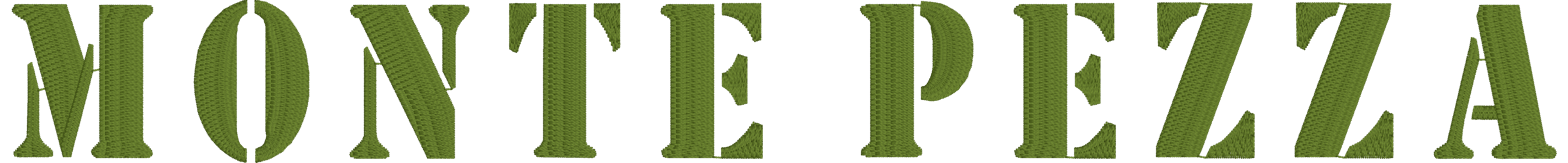
| Monte Pezza — Mountain action at Monte Pezza in the Gothic Line sector. |

==== Recipient units ====
- Royal Natal Carbineers
- Royal Durban Light Infantry
- First City Volunteers of Grahamstown
- Cape Town Highlanders, The Duke of Connaught and Strathearn's Own

Module code: Monte_Pezza

=== Monte Porro del Bagno ===
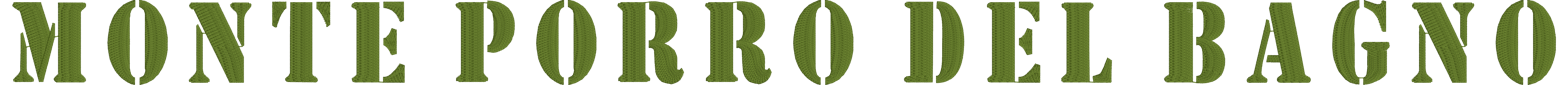
| Monte Porro del Bagno — Fighting at Monte Porro del Bagno in the Apennines. |

==== Recipient units ====
- Kimberley Volunteer Regiment
- Imperial Light Horse

Module code: Monte_Porro_del_Bagno

=== Monte Salvaro ===
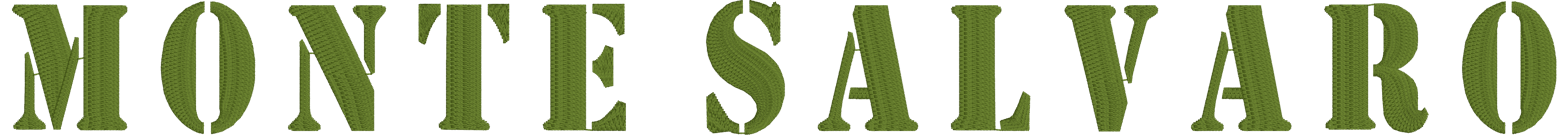
| Monte Salvaro — Fighting for Monte Salvaro in the Gothic Line battles. |

==== Recipient units ====
- Witwatersrand Rifles Regiment
- Kimberley Volunteer Regiment
- Imperial Light Horse
- Regiment de la Rey

Module code: Monte_Salvaro

=== Monte Stanco ===
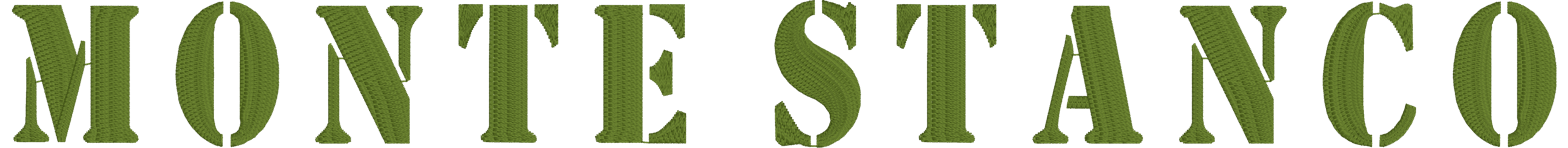
| Monte Stanco — Capture/fighting at Monte Stanco during the Gothic Line offensive. |

==== Recipient units ====
- Witwatersrand Rifles Regiment
- Royal Natal Carbineers
- Royal Durban Light Infantry
- First City Volunteers of Grahamstown
- Regiment de la Rey
- Cape Town Highlanders, The Duke of Connaught and Strathearn's Own

Module code: Monte_Stanco

=== Monte Vigese ===
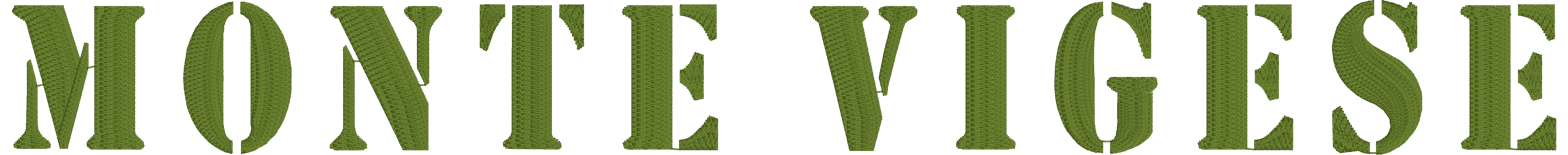
| Monte Vigese — Action at Monte Vigese during the Italian mountain campaign. |

==== Recipient units ====
- Royal Natal Carbineers
- Kimberley Volunteer Regiment
- Imperial Light Horse

Module code: Monte_Vigese

=== Po Valley ===
Main article: Spring 1945 offensive in Italy

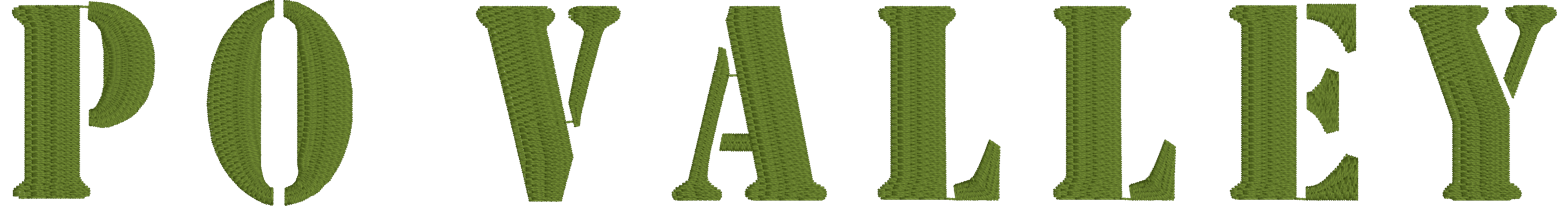
| Po Valley — Spring 1945 offensive into the Po Valley, ending organised German resistance in Italy. |

==== Recipient units ====
- Witwatersrand Rifles Regiment
- Special Service Battalion
- Royal Natal Carbineers
- Royal Durban Light Infantry
- Prince Alfred's Own Volunteer Guards
- Pretoria Regiment
- Natal Mounted Rifles
- Kimberley Volunteer Regiment
- Imperial Light Horse
- First City Volunteers of Grahamstown
- Regiment de la Rey
- Cape Town Highlanders, The Duke of Connaught and Strathearn's Own

Module code: Po_Valley

=== Sole/Caprara ===
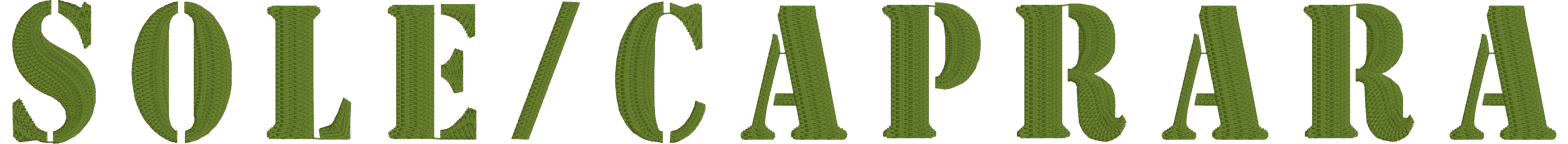
| Sole/Caprara — Final Apennine actions around Sole/Caprara in spring 1945. |

==== Recipient units ====
- Witwatersrand Rifles Regiment
- Royal Durban Light Infantry
- First City Volunteers of Grahamstown
- Regiment de la Rey
- Cape Town Highlanders, The Duke of Connaught and Strathearn's Own

Module code: Sole_Caprara

== Border War and southern Africa ==
=== Rhodesia 1967-75 ===
Main article: Rhodesian Bush War

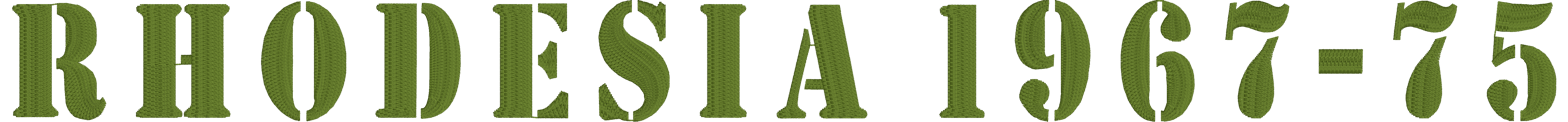
| Rhodesia 1967-75 — South African support and operations connected with the Rhodesian Bush War period (1967–75) as recognised for unit honours. |

==== Recipient units ====
- S.A. Police (1913–1994)

Module code: Rhodesia_1967_75

=== South West Africa/Angola 1975-1976 ===
Main article: South African Border War

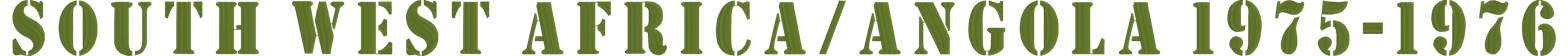
| South West Africa/Angola 1975-1976 — Early Border War theatre honour for South West Africa/Angola operations in 1975–76, including Operation Savannah. |

==== Recipient units ====
- Special Service Battalion
- Kaffrarian Rifle Volunteers

Module code: South_West_Africa_Angola_1975_1976

=== South West Africa/Angola 1976-1989 ===
Main article: South African Border War

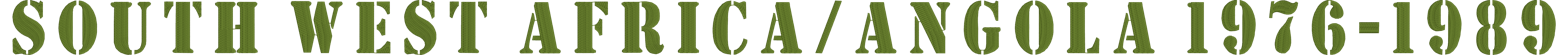
| South West Africa/Angola 1976-1989 — Long theatre honour for South West Africa/Angola operations from 1976 to 1989. |

==== Recipient units ====
- Special Service Battalion
- Kaffrarian Rifle Volunteers
- 61 Mechanised Infantry Battalion Group

Module code: South_West_Africa_Angola_1976_1989

=== Cassinga/Chetequera ===
Main article: Battle of Cassinga

| Cassinga/Chetequera — May 1978 airborne and ground operations against SWAPO at Cassinga and related Chetequera objectives (Operation Reindeer). |

==== Recipient units ====
- 3 Parachute Regiment

Module code: Cassinga_Chetequera

=== South West Africa/Zambia 1979 ===
Main article: South African Border War

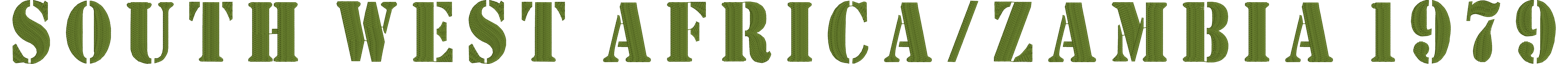
| South West Africa/Zambia 1979 — Honour for 1979 operations involving South West Africa/Zambia. |

==== Recipient units ====
- Kaffrarian Rifle Volunteers

Module code: South_West_Africa_Zambia_1979

=== Xangongo/Ongiva ===
Main article: Operation Protea

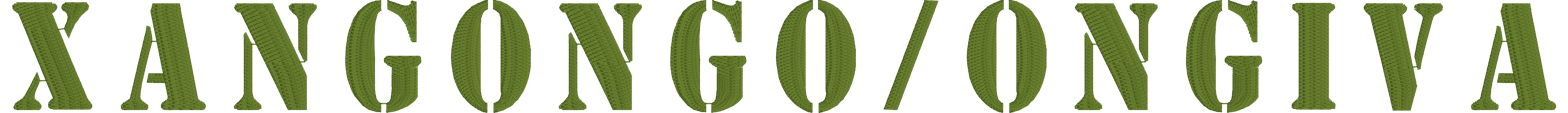
| Xangongo/Ongiva — Operation Protea (1981) seizure of Xangongo and Ongiva in southern Angola. |

==== Recipient units ====
- 61 Mechanised Infantry Battalion Group

Module code: Xangongo_Ongiva

=== Mulemba/Mulola ===
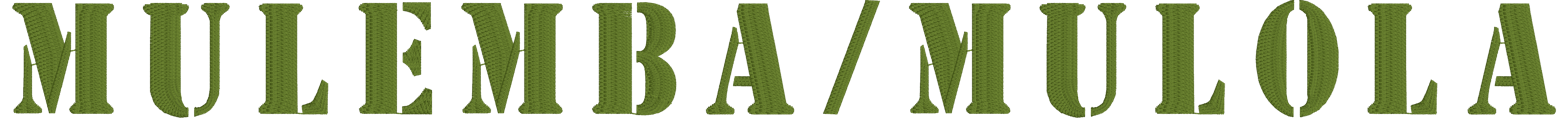
| Mulemba/Mulola — Border War honour for operations in the Mulemba/Mulola area. |

==== Recipient units ====
- 61 Mechanised Infantry Battalion Group

Module code: Mulemba_Mulola

=== Mavinga II ===
Main article: Battle of the Lomba

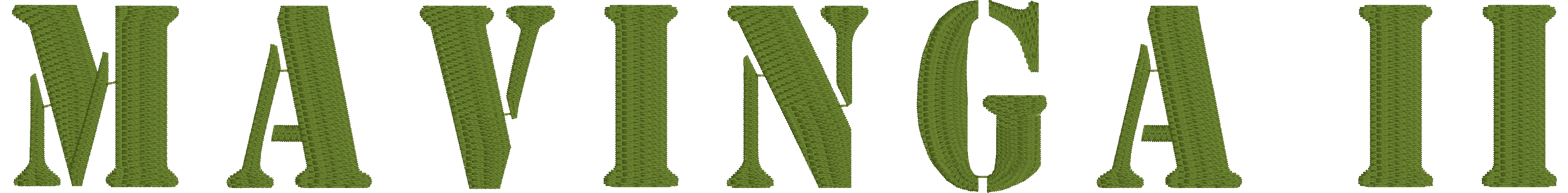
| Mavinga II — Fighting in the Mavinga sector (second recognised phase) during Angolan operations. |

==== Recipient units ====
- 61 Mechanised Infantry Battalion Group

Module code: Mavinga_II

=== Mavinga III ===
Main article: Battle of Cuito Cuanavale

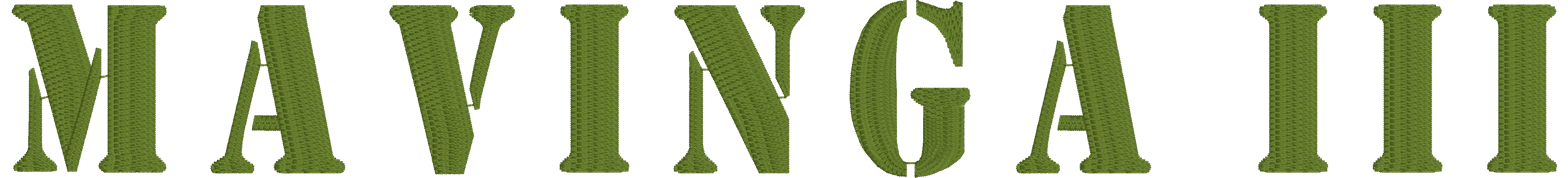
| Mavinga III — Later Mavinga-sector operations culminating in the 1987–88 Lomba/Cuito fighting. |

==== Recipient units ====
- 61 Mechanised Infantry Battalion Group

Module code: Mavinga_III

=== Cuito Cuanaval ===
Main article: Battle of Cuito Cuanavale

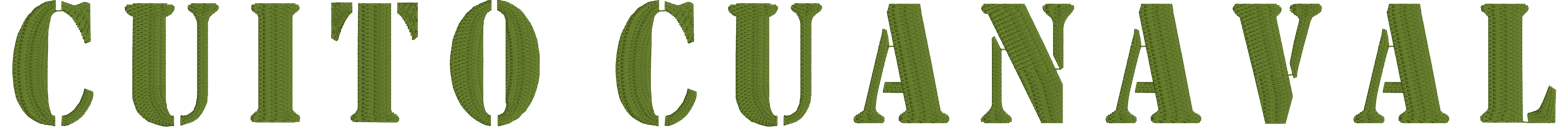
| Cuito Cuanaval — Battle of Cuito Cuanavale (1987–88); spelling on some colours follows the issued form “Cuito Cuanaval”. Note: Issued spelling on some colours; commonly Cuito Cuanavale. |

==== Recipient units ====
- 61 Mechanised Infantry Battalion Group

Module code: Cuito_Cuanaval

=== Kunene ===
Main article: Cunene River

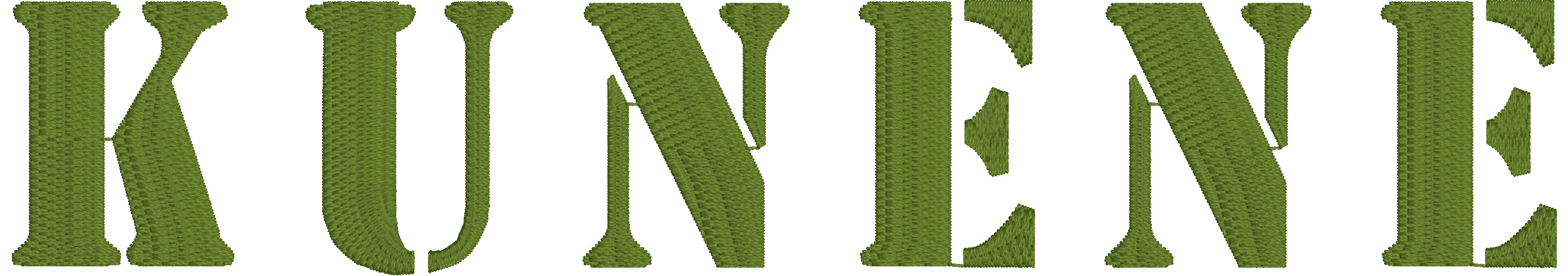
| Kunene — Operations along the Kunene (Cunene) River frontier during the Border War. |

==== Recipient units ====
- Special Service Battalion

Module code: Kunene

=== Calueque ===
Main article: Battle of Calueque

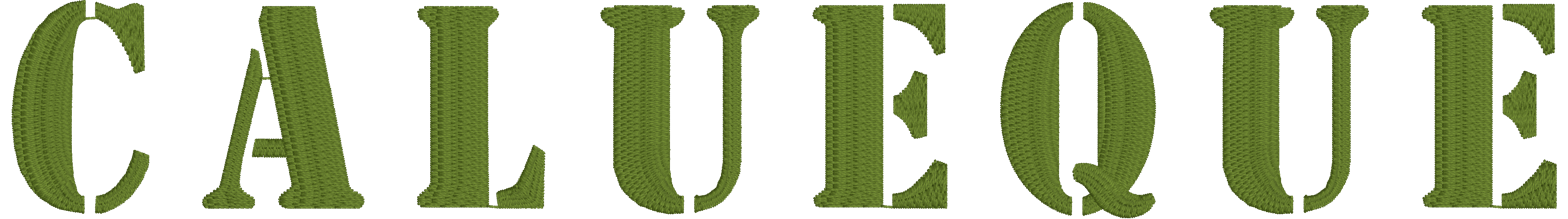
| Calueque — June 1988 strike on the Calueque dam/bridge complex on the Cunene during the late Border War. |

==== Recipient units ====
- 61 Mechanised Infantry Battalion Group
- 8 South African Infantry Battalion

Module code: Calueque

=== Bangui ===
Main article: Battle of Bangui (2013)

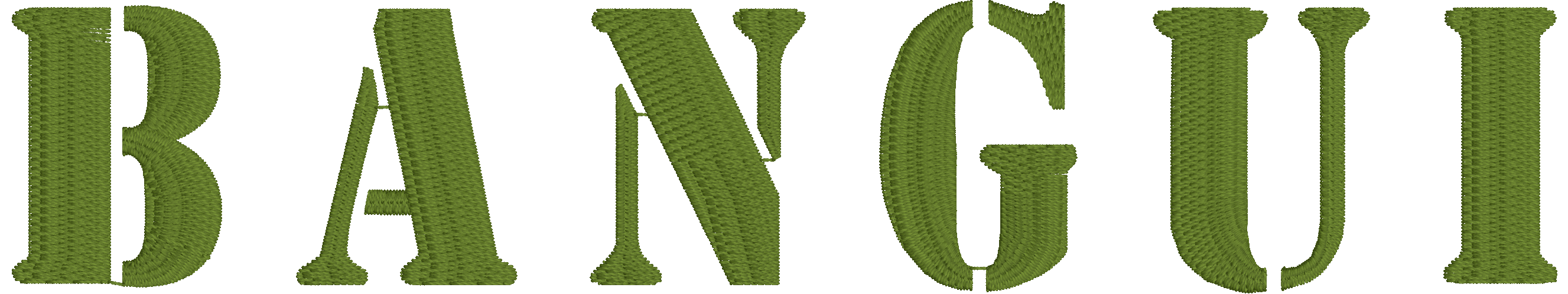
| Bangui — Battle of Bangui (March 2013), in which a small SANDF force fought Seleka rebels during a Central African Republic deployment. |

==== Recipient units ====
- 1 Parachute Battalion
- 5 Special Forces Regiment
- 7 Medical Battalion

Module code: Bangui

== See also ==
- Battle honours of South Africa
- List of South African military units
- Template:BattleHonour
