= Eland armoured car =

South African light armoured car

Eland Mk7
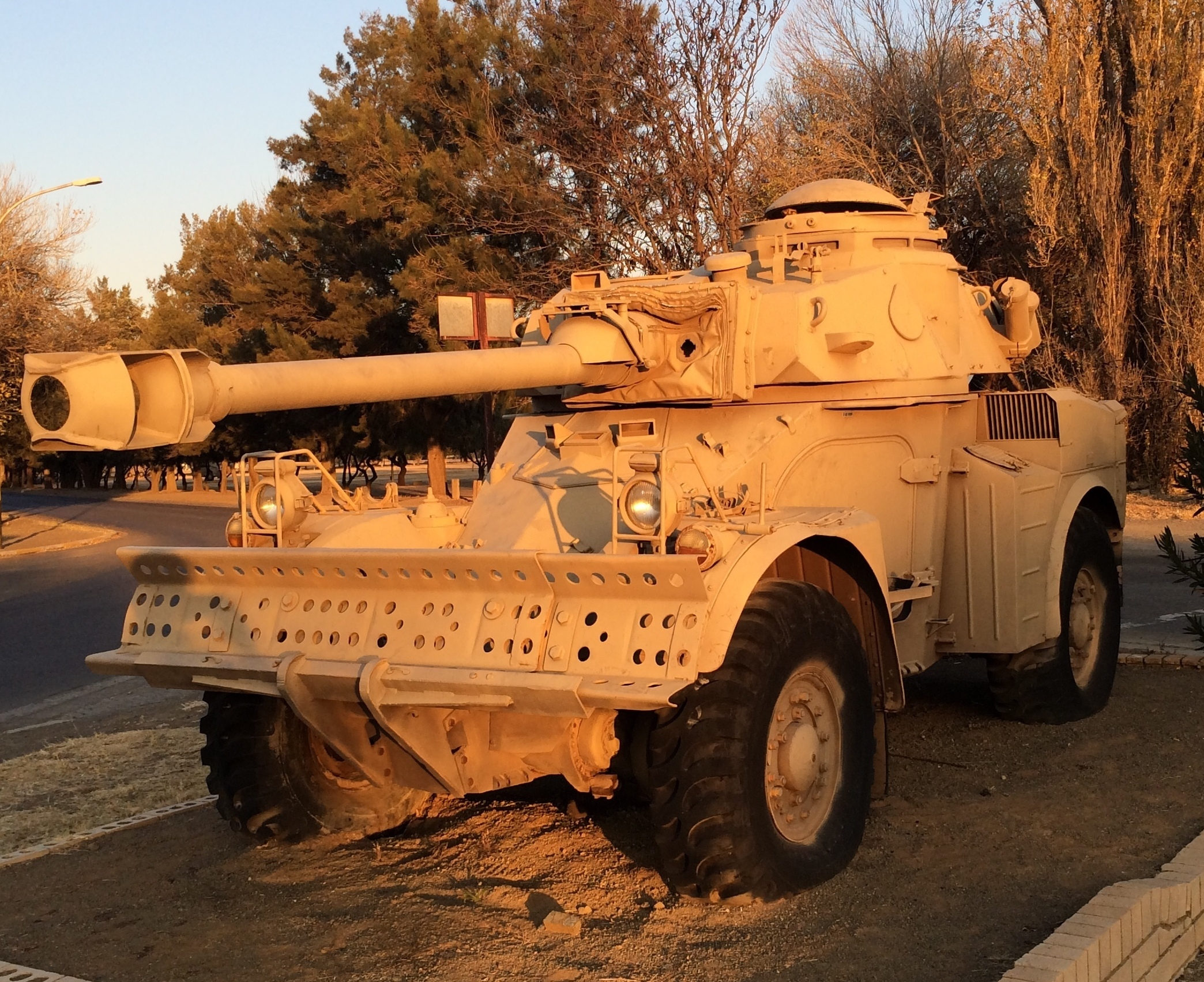
- Eland Mk7 at the Tempe School of Armour, Bloemfontein
- Type: Armoured car
- Place of origin: South Africa

Service history
- In service: 1962–1994 (South Africa); 1967–present (other)
- Used by: See Operators
- Wars: Angolan Civil War; Rhodesian Bush War; 1981 Entumbane Uprising; South African Border War; Western Sahara War; Second Congo War; Chadian Civil War; Northern Mali conflict; Boko Haram insurgency

Production history
- Designer: Sandock-Austral
- Designed: 1962
- Manufacturer: Sandock-Austral; Reumech OMC
- Produced: 1964 – 1986
- No. built: 1,600
- Variants: See Variants

Specifications
- Mass: 6 tonnes (6.6 short tons; 5.9 long tons)
- Length: 5.12 m (16 ft 10 in)
- length: 4.04 m (13 ft 3 in) (hull)
- Width: 2.01 m (6 ft 7 in)
- Height: 2.5 m (8 ft 2 in)
- Crew: 3 (commander, driver, gunner)
- Main armament: 90mm Denel GT-2 (29 rounds); OR; 60mm K1 mortar (56 rounds)
- Secondary armament: 2x 7.62mm M1919 Browning machine guns (2400 - 3800 rounds)
- Engine: Chevrolet 153 2.5 L (150 in^{3}) inline 4-cylinder water-cooled petrol
- Transmission: 6-speed manual constant mesh
- Suspension: Independent 4X4; active trailing arms
- Ground clearance: 380 mm (1 ft 3 in)
- Fuel capacity: 142 L (38 US gal)
- Operational range: 450 km (280 mi)
- Maximum speed: 100 km/h (62 mph)

The Eland is an air-portable light armoured car based on the Panhard AML. Designed and built for long-range reconnaissance, it mounts either a 60mm (2.4 in) breech-loading mortar or a Denel GT-2 90mm (3.5 in) gun on a very compact chassis. Although lightly armoured, the vehicle's permanent 4X4 drive makes it faster over flat terrain than many tanks.

The Eland was developed for the South African Defence Force (SADF) in South Africa's first major arms programme since World War II, with prototypes completed in 1963. By 1991, 1,600 examples had been built for home and export; prominent foreign operators included Morocco and Zimbabwe (formerly Rhodesia). Local overhauls incorporating lessons from internal operations have resulted in a vehicle capable of withstanding the unforgiving Southern African environment and highly mobile operational style of the SADF.

== Development history ==
=== Background ===
For many years the standard armoured car of the South African Defence Force was the Daimler Ferret, which was developed in the late 1940s and armed with a single general-purpose machine gun. By the mid-1960s, Ferret spares were becoming difficult to obtain, and its armament was considered less than adequate. In 1961, South Africa accordingly secured a similar platform with a much wider range of armament installations: the French Panhard AML. That July a South African military delegation headed by Minister of Defence Jim Fouché and Commandant-General Pieter Grobbelaar, chief of the SADF, went to France to negotiate a licensing agreement with Panhard. The AML was favoured because the SADF's priorities at the time were fighting a possible counter-insurgency campaign or an unconventional bush war, the basic requirements of which were light armoured vehicles with the greatest mobility and most simplified maintenance.

One hundred AMLs were purchased, presumably for preliminary evaluation purposes, as well as enough turrets, engines, and other associated parts for the later assembly of another 800 in South Africa. Panhard also approved a licence for domestic production of the AML chassis in South African plants. A separate licence was obtained from the French government's Direction technique des armements terrestres (DTAT) between 1964 and 1965 for the manufacture of the AML turrets and armament. The result was the VA (Vehicle A) Mk2, first offered to the SADF's armoured car regiments and reconnaissance commands in 1964. Bids were accepted from four local companies for the manufacture of 300 AMLs with working armament, along with another 150 turretless demonstrators; this contract was claimed by Sandock-Austral, now Land Systems OMC. The production lines were set up with technical assistance from Henschel, an engineering firm based in the Federal Republic of Germany. Panhard subcontracted the project to Henschel rather than carrying out the work itself as it was anxious to avoid criticism from its potential clients in other African states.

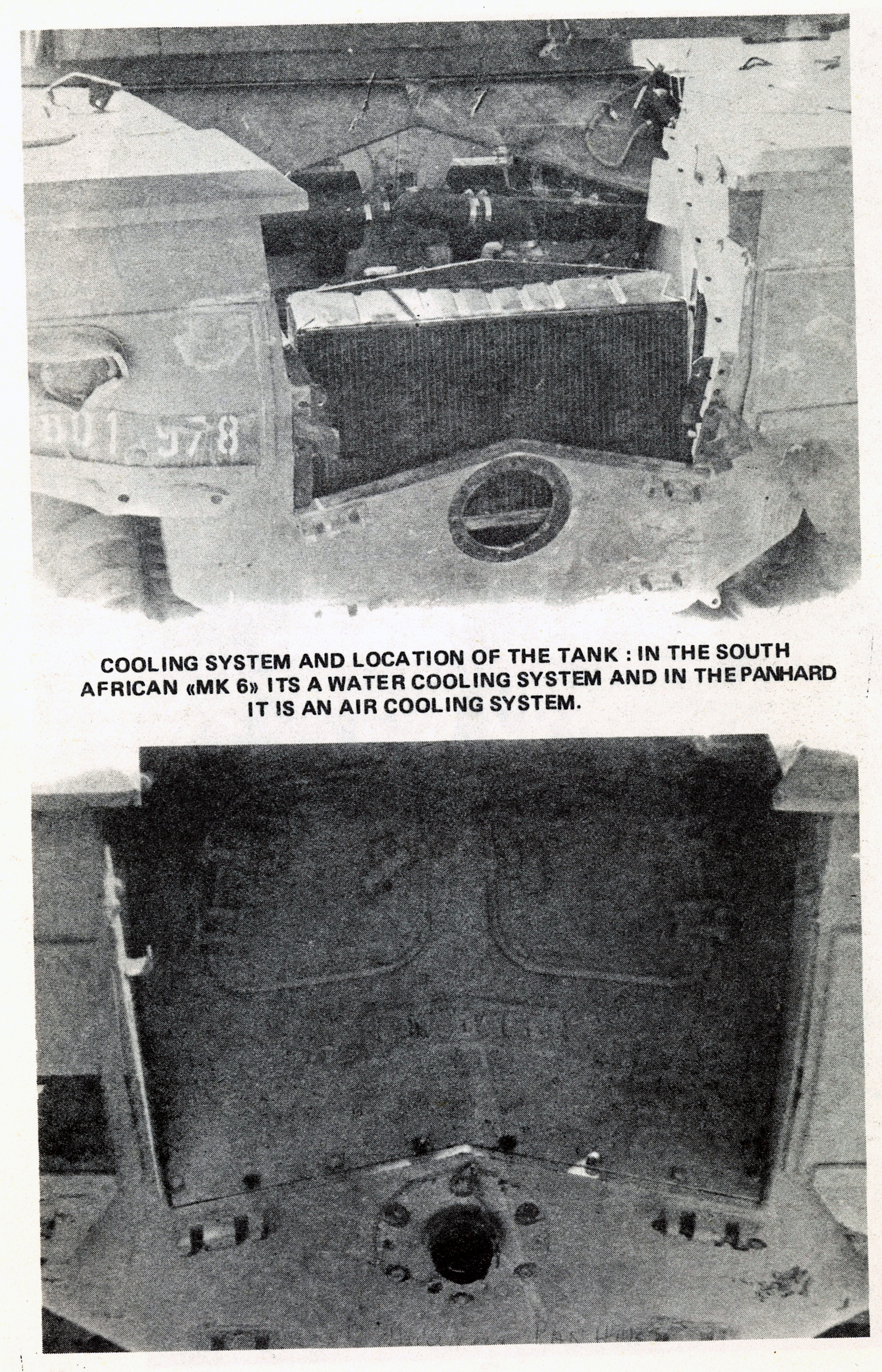
Comparison of the rear hulls and cooling systems of an Eland Mk6 and a Panhard AML

Sandock VAs initially fared rather poorly; all 56 models furbished in 1966 were rejected by the South African Army. An extensive rebuild programme followed - the Panhards were returned to the manufacturer, completely disassembled, restructured, and trialled again. These new vehicles claimed a local content of forty per cent but remained heavily bolstered by components imported from France in 1961. Upon undergoing several upgrades to the steering (Mk2) and brakes (Mk3), each vehicle was also equipped with a custom fuel system; the electric clutches were concurrently replaced by more conventional pressure plate clutches (Mk4). While South Africa's AMLs remained externally similar to their French counterparts, up to two-thirds of their parts were of local origin by 1967, the main part of that balance being a new water cooled inline-4 cylinder petrol engine installed in the Mk5. Subsequent models were officially designated Eland.

Panhard's initial licensing contract with the South African government extended to the local assembly or manufacture of up to 1,000 AMLs. Furthermore, all vehicles produced under the terms of this licence could only be re-exported with written permission from the French Minister of Defence. It is unclear whether these restrictions extended to the second generation of Elands, which were produced with wholly South African parts and components beginning in 1973. South Africa may have renewed the original Panhard licence as part of a larger agreement with France concerning the transfer of arms and defence technology around January 1974; another 700 Elands were manufactured between 1974 and 1986. By 1985 production had reached two hundred vehicles a year. A surplus of parts were manufactured for the Eland as well as the original AML series; according to General Jannie Geldenhuys, after 1979 Panhard actually fulfilled orders for older AML parts it no longer produced by sourcing them from South Africa.

Operated by a crew of three, each Eland was built on a small and remarkably lightweight 4X4 chassis with a height of 2.5 metres, a length of 5.12 metres, and a weight of 6 metric tons. The Eland had a maximum range of 450 kilometres and a mileage of 2 kilometres per litre. As South Africa was primarily interested in a light patrol vehicle armed for counter-insurgency purposes, most Elands were armed with the 60mm Brandt Mle CM60A1 gun-mortar, better known by its South African manufacturing code K1 and also designated in SADF service as the M2, as well as two 7.62mm Browning machine guns. This was known as the Eland-60.

The second most common variant was designed specifically to fulfill a South African requirement for a gun-armed armoured car capable of furnishing mobile fire support for the mounted units and undertaking aggressive reconnaissance as needed. As the SADF had been organised along the lines of Commonwealth doctrine in general and British doctrine in particular, it wanted a vehicle capable of filling the same role as the Alvis Saladin. Although the Saladin was evaluated favourably since it shared most of its interchangeable parts with the army's Alvis Saracen armoured personnel carriers, the AML licence had already been purchased and there was an advantage to fulfilling the same requirement with another preexisting vehicle type. Negotiations to purchase Saladins from the United Kingdom also stalled after the election of Harold Wilson and his incoming Labour Party government, which took a harder line on arms sales to South Africa.

In response to SADF inquiries concerning an AML more similar to the Saladin in terms of armament, Panhard produced the AML-90. There was substantially more firepower in the new variant: its 90mm low-pressure rifled cannon, with a range of 1,200 metres, enabled it to knock out all but the heaviest contemporary tanks. This evolved into the Eland-90 in South African service.

=== Service life ===
Elands formed the mainstay of the South African Armoured Corps for nearly three decades, although as early as 1968 SADF officials were discussing their replacement or supplementation with something more suited to countering tank warfare as the prospect of conventional military conflict in southern Africa became increasingly likely. That year the armoured corps undertook a feasibility study for replacing the Eland with a larger, more mobile, and more heavily armed wheeled vehicle. While acknowledging the Eland was sufficient for border patrol and counter-insurgency, South African strategists were also concerned that it was unsuited for conventional battlefields. During a wargaming exercise designed to simulate a foreign invasion of South West Africa, the SADF found that the Eland-90 suffered from three major disadvantages: it had no trench-crossing ability, its off-road mobility was limited due to its four wheels and high ground pressure, and the 90mm cannon was ineffective against enemy armour at long range. In 1969, South African officials proposed fitting the existing fleet with ENTAC wire-guided anti-tank guided missiles (ATGMs). This was never implemented but the advantages of an ATGM capability in armoured car regiments were recognised as a means to compensate for the mediocre range of the Eland-90's main armament. Another proposal for an Eland variant armed with an autocannon appeared in 1971. The armoured corps evaluated several Elands armed with 20mm and 40mm autocannons between 1971 and 1972 and finally settled on the Hispano-Suiza HS.820 as its armament of choice. This was known as the Eland-20 but was not adopted by the SADF.

In 1970 the South African Army was operating 500 Elands of various marks, with another 356 on order. The fleet then consisted of 369 Eland-60s and 131 Eland-90s. This was followed by the Eland Mk6 programme, which entailed older models upgraded to Mk5 standards. By 1975 the army had 1,016 Eland Mk5s and Mk6s in service. The Eland was first tested in combat that year against Cuban and People's Armed Forces of Liberation of Angola (FAPLA) forces during Operation Savannah. Reports of PT-76 and T-34-85 tanks being fielded by FAPLA during the Angolan Civil War perturbed South African military advisers then involved in training FAPLA's rivals, the National Union for the Total Independence of Angola (UNITA) and its armed wing. The advisers reported that UNITA's anti-tank capabilities were next to nonexistent and requested a squadron of SADF armoured cars, along with their crews, to help turn the tide against FAPLA. Twenty-two Eland-90s were flown out to UNITA's headquarters at Silva Porto in mid-October 1975, and soon clashed with FAPLA armour. Elands were to acquire a fearsome combat reputation in Angola, where they earned the moniker "Red Ants" due to unorthodox but effective crew tactics and the lack of any equivalent Cuban or FAPLA vehicles. Less than two months later, Cuban general Abelardo Colomé Ibarra cited his inability to counter the Elands' superior manoeuvrability as one of the greatest tactical challenges facing the Cuban-FAPLA coalition in Angola. Nevertheless, with the onset of the Angolan rainy season the wheeled vehicles were increasingly hampered by mud, and their crews found fighting capability constrained when operating on terrain better suited for tracked vehicles. They criticised the lowness of the hull as well, which made sighting difficult over thick bush. The Elands' reliability was also somewhat called into question: nearly half the armoured cars in the squadron were rendered unserviceable at one time or another due to engine failures. These limitations emphasised the need for the development of a new mark of Eland further modified for southern African conditions.

The Eland continued to enjoy distinction in SADF service, especially with the 1 Special Service Battalion and 61 Mechanised Infantry Battalion Group. During Operation Protea and Operation Askari in 1981 and 1983, respectively, Eland-90s proved capable of eliminating Cuban and FAPLA T-34-85 and T-54/55 tanks at close range. The SADF began to gradually retire its Elands beginning in the mid-1980s, replacing them with the larger and notably more dependable Ratel-90 and Ratel-60 infantry fighting vehicles, which could carry the same armament but also a squad of infantry.

I turned to see one of our small, odd-looking Eland armoured ‘Noddy' cars with its long 90-millimetre gun barrelling towards us at almost top speed from across the chana...it turned nimbly, kicking up a cloud of dust as he came directly through our scattered line and then turned again, this time towards the tank. The little armoured car came to a quick stop right in the middle of the open ground about 80 metres from the tank, waited a couple of seconds and then fired one shot from [its] 90-millimetre with a loud bang. The shot was right on target. When the smoke drifted away the T-34's turret was lying off to one side and the open body was burning, belching dense black smoke.

— South African paratrooper describes a standoff between an Eland and a T-34-85 during Operation Protea. It was common for armour contacts to be fought at extremely close range in the Angolan bush.

Once envisaged only as a scout car, the Eland auspiciously doubled in the role of an assault gun and an ersatz tank destroyer—but its obsolescence was highlighted by several factors, namely a flammable petrol engine which was especially vulnerable to rocket-propelled grenades or mine explosions, and its limited off-road mobility. The effectiveness of the low-pressure 90mm gun against modern tanks was also questionable; during Operation Askari Eland-90s' high-explosive anti-tank shells rarely penetrated enemy T-54s without multiple hits.

Although they remained relatively popular with the armoured corps, Elands were not well-regarded by the mechanised infantry due to several unsuccessful attempts to integrate them with Ratel-mounted combat teams. The Eland simply lacked the range and mobility to keep pace with the Ratels during a firefight, and was more prone to technical malfunctions in the bush. The squat, compact vehicles were often ridiculed as "noddy cars" by infantrymen due to their quaint profile and small size as compared to the much heavier Ratel. This derisive nickname may have also been a reference to an Eland-90's tendency to rock on its axles while firing its main gun. Nevertheless, it was later adopted with affectionate pride by Eland crews.

The final variant to enter production, the Eland Mk7, was introduced in 1979. It possessed new power brakes, a modified transmission, and a lengthier hull for accommodating taller South African crewmen. A domed cupola with vision blocks was also added over the commander's hatch. Hard lessons driven home by Operation Savannah ensured the new Elands were also designed for operating long distances from supply and logistical centres, with maximum ease of maintenance in the field. For example, the engine was now mounted on a rail frame so it could be removed and replaced in under forty minutes. The Eland Mk7 was kept in production for another eight years, until its basic technology had become quite dated despite continuous upgrades. The South African Armoured Corps retired most of its Elands from combat service in the late 1980s, utilising them primarily for training Ratel-90 crews. In October 1988, South Africa unveiled a new indigenous armoured car known as the Rooikat. The Rooikat, which had emerged from the original requirement for a larger and more effectively armed vehicle to supplant the Eland series on conventional battlefields, was much more mobile and carried a sophisticated 76mm high-velocity cannon capable of engaging armour at longer standoff ranges. In 1994, the Eland-60 and Eland-90 were formally retired from the newly integrated South African National Defence Force (SANDF) in favour of the Rooikat.

== Combat history ==
=== South Africa ===
==== Initial service ====
South Africa's determination to retain the disputed territory of South West Africa, which it had governed essentially as a fifth province since World War I, resulted in an armed insurgency by the People's Liberation Army of Namibia (PLAN), the militant wing of the nationalist South West African People's Organisation (SWAPO). Insurgent activity took the form of ambushes and selective target attacks, particularly in the Caprivi Strip near the Zambian border. Reflecting a trend characteristic of many Anglophone Commonwealth states, local police were initially granted responsibility for managing counter-insurgency operations rather than the South African armed forces. However, by 1969 the security situation in Caprivi had deteriorated to the point that the SADF was forced to deploy a troop of Elands and several companies of infantry there.

A year later, PLAN began adopting mine warfare as an integral part of its attempts to hinder the mobility of South African convoys on the limited road network. Mine-laying was often used as a means to throw the convoys into disarray prior to an ambush. This tactic resulted in some of the heaviest SADF and police casualties thus far and evolved into one of the most defining features of PLAN's war effort for the next two decades. The SADF's immediate solution was to utilise its Elands for convoy escort purposes, as they were the only vehicles it possessed capable of surviving a mine explosion and also suppressing an ambush. An Eland-60 or Eland-90 was delegated to lead each convoy, with the other drivers continuing in its tracks. However, it soon became clear this practice was not an effective countermeasure. The armoured cars' petrol engines were vulnerable to the risk of fire whenever they detonated a mine. PLAN also responded by acquiring anti-tank mines, namely Soviet TM-46s, in large quantities.

On one occasion an Eland-90 detonated two TM-46s, which sent the vehicle airborne and hurled it about thirty metres away, after which it landed on its turret. Although the three crew members escaped serious injury, incidents like these demonstrated that the Eland simply lacked the mass to absorb the explosive force of an anti-tank mine. For the SADF and the police, the only other viable option was the adoption of armoured personnel carriers with mine-proof hulls that could move quickly on roads with little risk to their passengers even if a mine like the TM-46 was encountered. This would trigger a series of experiments aimed at producing a new class of military vehicle, the mine resistant and ambush protected vehicle (MRAP). From 1974 onward, Elands began to be replaced in their traditional role of convoy escort by specialised mineproofed vehicles.

==== Operation Savannah ====
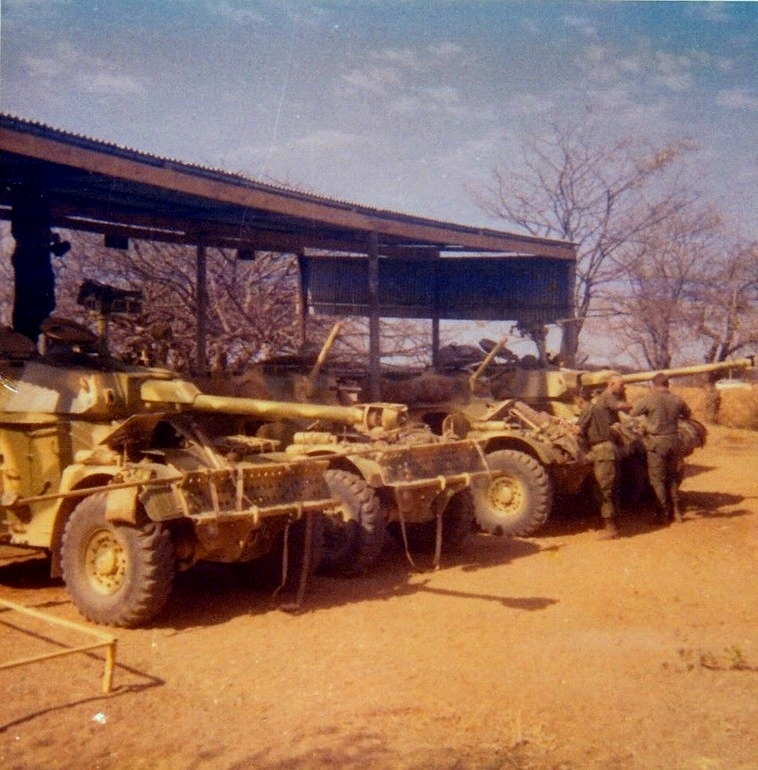
Elands in forward staging areas prior to Operation Savannah

The collapse of Portuguese colonial rule in South West Africa's northern neighbour, Angola, led to dramatic changes in South African foreign and defence policy. Factional infighting between the three rival Angolan nationalist movements pursuing their own separate strategies directed towards consolidating political power and influence in the colonial state was almost inevitable; by mid 1975 the country had degenerated into outright civil war. South Africa discreetly sponsored two of three Angolan factions, the National Union for the Total Independence of Angola (UNITA) and the National Liberation Front of Angola (FNLA), in the hopes of eliciting their cooperation with the SADF to deny PLAN sanctuary in Angola; this project was known as Operation Savannah. However, both UNITA and the FNLA were defeated and driven from the Angolan capital, Luanda, by the third faction—People's Movement for the Liberation of Angola (MPLA) that July.

Unlike the FNLA and UNITA, the MPLA possessed a militant wing, the People's Armed Forces for the Liberation of Angola (FAPLA), which was well-equipped for conventional warfare and aided by an infusion of arms from the Soviet Union and Cuban military advisers. Instrumental in its capture of Luanda were a number of second-hand Soviet T-34-85 tanks, likely manned by well-drilled and experienced Cuban crews. Neither the FNLA nor UNITA possessed anti-tank weaponry, and their lightly armed troops were no match for the FAPLA armour. As part of its own covert intervention programme in Angola, the Central Intelligence Agency was able to persuade Zaire to donate some Panhard AML-90s and M40 recoilless rifles to the FNLA and UNITA in exchange for receiving more modern American weaponry. South Africa assembled an advisory and liaison team which included six armour instructors to train the UNITA AML crews. The SADF advisers planned to have three crews trained in several weeks, but they were not afforded this luxury as a FAPLA offensive was already underway to seize UNITA's headquarters at Nova Lisboa. Permission was granted by the South African political leadership to have the AMLs manned by the instructors until such a time as the UNITA crews could be trained to a minimal standard. UNITA and the SADF advisory team first clashed with a FAPLA armoured unit at the village of Norton de Matos, where they came under heavy fire from T-34-85 and PT-76 tanks. The South Africans attempted to fight off their opponents with their AML-90s and some ENTAC anti-tank missiles, but were forced to withdraw after a fierce skirmish.

The action at Norton de Metos had deeply shaken South Africa's confidence in UNITA's ability to win the war against FAPLA on its own, especially with its limited arsenal. During a meeting with UNITA leader Jonas Savimbi and the heads of the advisory mission on October 7, the SADF instructors argued that they would need better armour assets than the handful of dilapidated AMLs possessed by Savimbi. Their request was approved on the condition that any extension of the SADF's operational capacities in Angola remain strictly covert. All equipment, weapons, vehicles, and ammunition bound for the Angolan front were to be supplied through nonconventional channels and unmarked. SADF uniforms and insignia were explicitly prohibited. On October 9, a squadron of Eland-90s and their crews were hurriedly deployed to the border, ready to be airlifted deep into Angola five days later. The personnel involved were stripped of all their identifiable equipment, even their dog tags, and re-issued with nondescript uniforms and personal weapons impossible to trace. They were told to pose as mercenaries if questioned. Officials exempted Elands from the ban on South African weapons because it was well known that UNITA and the FNLA operated the externally identical AML, and they were regarded as suitably anonymous. To reinforce this impression, SADF crew members painted the armoured cars with UNITA markings. The Elands were attached to two separate composite battlegroups of motorised infantry, code named Task Force Zulu and Task Force Foxbat, respectively. Their objectives were to destroy the FAPLA forces south of Luanda and advance northwards, seizing as much territory as they could for the FNLA and UNITA before Angola's formal independence date on November 11, six weeks away. It was intended for Eland troops to merely support motorised infantry on roads, but since no other armour was available the South Africans deployed them as column spearheads. Eland-90s performed reconnaissance by fire, depending on their speed and mobility to carry them through potential ambushes. The SADF's use of light, fast-moving Elands backed by truck-mounted infantry advancing at full speed allowed it to retain the initiative and keep FAPLA continually off balance. Task Force Zulu was able to cover about ninety kilometres per day, even when the rainy season slowed momentum. By the time FAPLA redeployed sufficient forces along its southern front to halt the SADF advance, Zulu and Foxbat had advanced over 500 kilometres and captured eighteen major towns and cities.

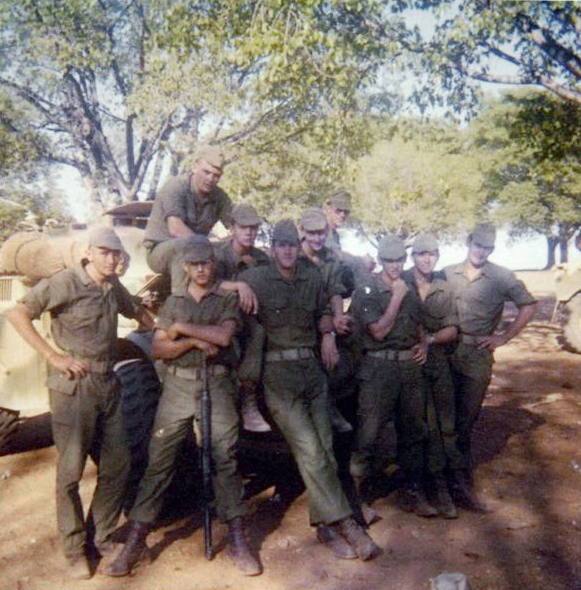
Eland crews pose with their vehicles during Operation Savannah. Note the nondescript uniforms.

FAPLA hastily established a rough line of defence from Norton de Matos to the strategic railway junction at Catengue, which lay on the highway between Nova Lisboa and Luanda. Unbeknownst to the SADF, Catengue was situated near a FAPLA training camp which housed a significant contingent of Cuban advisers. The Cubans planned an elaborate defence of Catengue, intending to pin the South African armoured cars on the road and strip away the supporting FNLA foot soldiers with a composite battery of 82mm mortars and Grad-P 122mm rocket artillery. As the Eland crews attempted to redeploy to suppress the defenders, a FAPLA anti-tank section with B-10 recoilless rifles and RPG-7s would finish them off. Although they had to come to a halt to return fire, the Elands escaped destruction during the actual engagement by rapidly manoeuvring between firing positions. While the armoured cars laid down suppressing fire on the mortar pits and kept the FAPLA troops preoccupied, the supporting SADF and FNLA infantrymen regrouped and carried out a successful flanking attack. The defenders were routed. Four Cubans had died during the battle for Catengue, seven were wounded, and another thirteen listed as missing in action.

Unaware that Catengue had fallen, several companies of Cuban and FAPLA infantry and an armoured reconnaissance platoon advanced south to reinforce the junction. The Eland-90s took up positions alongside the narrow highway and ambushed the approaching FAPLA vehicles one at a time, destroying them. Meanwhile, the revelation that Cuban advisers had been engaged by South African regulars with armour of their own prompted President Fidel Castro to approve a request from FAPLA for direct military assistance. In the following weeks, Cuban combat troops began arriving in Luanda by sea and air. Upon their arrival, they were supplied with T-34-85 tanks, hundreds of which had been shipped directly to Luanda by the Soviet Union to avoid transshipment delays in Havana.

The next major engagement between the Cubans and South African armour did not occur until November 23. One of the last settlements the SADF needed to capture before it could reach within striking distance of Luanda itself was Porto Amboim. To slow the SADF's advance, Cuban sappers had destroyed all the bridges over the Cuvo River south of Porto Amboim. Undeterred, both South African battlegroups began searching for alternative routes towards the east. More Cuban units redeployed to block their advance again at Quibala, a town which sat astride the only other highway to Luanda. While reconnoitering potential routes by which to attack Quibala from the east, Foxbat encountered an intact bridge over the Mabassa River near the village of Ebo. The defenders had anticipated that the SADF might attempt to cross the river there and had laid an ambush with recoilless rifles, BM-21 Grads, and a ZiS-3 anti-tank gun. When the South African armoured cars began crossing the bridge, the Cubans opened fire. The first Eland on the bridge was immediately knocked out by an RPG or recoilless rifle round, followed in rapid succession by three more. The surviving Elands on the opposite bank found it difficult to take evasive action due to their inability to manoeuvre in thick mud, and another three were destroyed. Futile attempts were made to recover the armoured cars for several hours, after which Foxbat withdrew. FAPLA later extricated the damaged and wrecked Elands on site and towed them away for propaganda purposes.

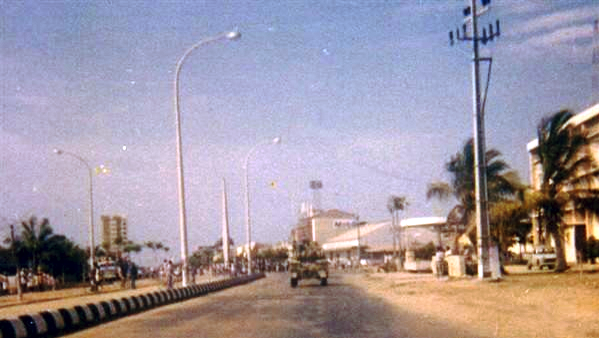
An Eland-90 driving into Lobito in November 1975

With its advance stymied for the time being, the SADF continued its search for alternative routes to Quibala and discovered another surviving bridge on the Nhia River, which had been damaged but not thoroughly demolished by Cuban sappers. This was known informally as "Bridge 14". South African army engineers began to repair the bridge under the cover of darkness on December 11, allowing the accompanying Elands to launch a surprise attack across it at dawn. Cuban mortar crews and anti-tank platoons armed with 9M14 Malyutka missiles had begun to deploy into ambush positions just beyond the bridge; however, several were wiped out when the SADF took the precaution of shelling the opposite riverbank with artillery. As they advanced the Eland crews also avoided the centre of the bridge, where the Cubans had trained their missiles. Taken by surprise, the defending Cuban and FAPLA units began a disorderly withdrawal. They regrouped at the village of Catofe, about sixteen kilometres south of Quibala, where they were reinforced by a company of T-34-85 tanks and prepared to make a final stand. Foxbat's Elands approached within five kilometres of Catofe but did not advance any further, owing to concerns about having overextended their lines.

While the campaign south of Quibala was in progress, two new battle groups modelled after Foxbat and Zulu, codenamed X-Ray and Orange respectively, had been formed in Silva Porto to fight the Cuban-FAPLA alliance in eastern Angola. Orange was dispatched northwards to capture Malanje while X-Ray moved further east to secure the railway line from Benguela. On 18 December, the first armour-to-armour engagement between South Africa and Cuba occurred when a troop of Eland-90s attached to Battle Group Orange reconnoitring potential river crossings east of Bridge 14 encountered three T-34-85s on the opposite bank. The Elands opened fire, destroying the lead tank and forcing the others to withdraw.

South Africa's decision to terminate Operation Savannah in the face of heavy international opposition and an increasingly formidable Cuban troop presence was made around January 1976, and the last SADF forces departed Angola in March. A detailed study of the Eland's advantages and shortcomings during that campaign was subsequently undertaken by the South African Armoured Corps. Much of the lessons learned from Angolan operations could also be readily applied to northern South West Africa, where the characteristics of the annual rainy season, compounded by dense vegetation and muddy terrain, were quite similar. Eland crews found that the density of the bush impeded their mobility, line of vision, and the traversing angle of their turrets. The region was also prone to dry flood plains, which filled into marshlike oshanas during the rainy season and posed a notoriously difficult obstacle for the four-wheeled armoured cars. While the Eland-90s brought to bear enormous firepower, they possessed limited ammunition stowage capacity. During Operation Savannah, it was not uncommon for an Eland to expend all its stored ammunition during a firefight and have to withdraw to the rear to resupply. Fourthly, the Eland was not designed as a troop-carrying vehicle. It possessed no interior space to accommodate an infantry section, forcing the attached SADF infantrymen to proceed on foot or ride in unarmoured trucks which offered minimal protection during ambushes. These issues highlighted the need for a dedicated infantry fighting vehicle in SADF service, which soon emerged in the form of the Ratel.

==== Operations Reindeer and Sceptic ====
Elands were again mobilised by the SADF for Operation Reindeer in May 1978, a coordinated strike on three suspected PLAN training complexes in Angola. For the purposes of this operation, the SADF experimented with an integrated combat team consisting of mechanised infantry mounted in the new Ratels, backed by attached Eland-90s providing fire support as needed. Three combat teams of Ratels and Eland-90s were created for the assault on a heavily fortified PLAN camp known as the "Dombondola Complex", also code named Objective Vietnam. One troop of Eland-90s would follow the Ratels during the attack, while the other two were to redeploy on the nearby highway linking Cuamato to Chetequera, where they could intercept stragglers or potential guerrilla reinforcements. The combat teams were backed by rear echelon which included a battery of towed BL 5.5-inch Medium Guns and logistics vehicles carrying enough fuel and ammunition for the journey; these were escorted by Eland-60s in a supporting role.

During the course of Operation Reindeer, numerous Elands repeatedly stalled in mud and even loose sand, leaving no alternative but to tow them out with the much heavier Ratels. The speed at which the combat team was able to cover ground was negatively affected by the Elands' poor momentum on broken terrain. Their petrol engines were also an issue, since this factor necessitated a separate logistics apparatus from those of the Ratels. When the attack on Vietnam began, the Eland-90s deployed into a static formation and began firing on the PLAN defenders. This would prove to be a fatal error, as the close proximity of the Elands to each other and their crews' failure to exploit their mobility allowed the guerrillas to concentrate their mortars and anti-tank weapons on the lightly armoured vehicles. It also limited their arcs of fire. Due to poor visibility on the battlefield, turret crews were inclined to leave all their hatches open for maximum situational awareness. The open hatches resulted in injuries and deaths due to mortar fragments. Additionally, the crews raised complaints about the 90mm ammunition, which was difficult to load and resulted in stoppages due to some inefficient plastic components.

As a result of the lessons incorporated during Operation Reindeer, the SADF and Sandock-Austral made several changes to the Eland and its main armament. The latest mark of Eland to be introduced incorporated a raised commander's cupola with vision blocks, similar to that of the Ratel. This improved the crew commander's observation capacity without compromising the protection afforded by the turret armour. Furthermore, the use of 90mm ammunition sourced from France was discontinued and production of local 90mm ammunition optimised for the Eland was accelerated. Finally, the armoured corps acknowledged that in a composite mechanised infantry group, the Eland-90 was not suited to fight in tandem with the Ratel. The former's fire support potential was useful, but its mobility was inferior to that of the Ratel and the need to maintain a separate logistics apparatus for a separate vehicle type, especially one with a petrol engine, was not deemed economical. These concerns were addressed in the short run by mating a Ratel chassis to an Eland-90's turret and 90mm gun, creating the Ratel-90. The Ratel-90 was seen as the ideal solution, since it simplified logistics and did not compromise the overall mobility of a mechanised combat team. Its six wheels, longer operating range, and 72 stowed rounds of 90mm ammunition were also considered much more suitable for mobile bush operations.

In June 1980 the SADF launched Operation Sceptic, the largest combined arms operation undertaken by any South African military force since World War II. Sceptic was essentially identical to Reindeer in terms of objectives and organisation: there were three mechanised combat teams equipped with Ratels, including the new Ratel-90s; the SADF also attached a fourth combat team consisting of Eland-90s and support infantry in Buffel armoured personnel carriers. There were also fifth and sixth combat teams composed entirely of paratroops, who functioned as light infantry, and a rear echelon. Their objective was to eliminate three PLAN training camps in southern Angola. The Eland-90s were given the task of leading the combat teams because the narrow width of their wheels made it difficult for them to follow in the wide tracks left by the Ratels. South African strategists also recognised that the Elands retained the poorest momentum and placed them at the front of the column to prevent them from being separated from the Ratels in the thick bush. As a consequence of this decision the combat teams advanced at a maximum speed of about 20 km/h. When the terrain became more challenging, the advance slowed to about 10 km/h. Due to their limited operating range several of the Elands ran out of fuel and had to be towed to the objective. When the combat teams reached the first PLAN facility, the stalled Elands were inadvertently towed by the Ratels into an insurgent ambush. Their crews found themselves unable to support the mechanised assault group while fighting for their own survival, and the 90mm guns were used as extremely close range to suppress counterattacking PLAN forces.

==== Operation Protea ====
SWAPO cadres and their Angolan hosts were undeterred by preceding SADF campaigns. Partisan recruitment continued in earnest, and the difficulties experienced in storming "Smokeshell" forced South African tacticians to recognise that conventional cross-border operations were intricate affairs. Nevertheless, Operation Sceptic had demonstrated that pressure on the home front could be relieved with aggressive preemptive or counterstrike strategy. In August 1981, four mechanised battlegroups staged Operation Protea - converging on SWAPO camps at Ongiva and Xangongo. At least three were equipped with Eland-90s, the remainder of the force being bolstered by Ratels and Eland-60s (again seconded to an artillery troop). Protea had three objectives: to disrupt SWAPO's logistical apparatus in southern Angola, to preempt further infiltration of South West Africa, and to capture or destroy as much military equipment as possible. This offensive was destined to encounter an unexpectedly large presence of Angolan regular forces, who brought their heavy armour into offensive action for the first time. In preparation for potential encounters with FAPLA T-34-85 tanks, elements of 61 Mechanised practised "firebelt" actions, integrating mutual support and specialised manoeuvres. It was, however, stripped of its Ratel-90 antitank platoon for Protea, necessitating a greater dependence on the Eland: a vehicle unable to keep pace with Ratels during rapid firebelts.

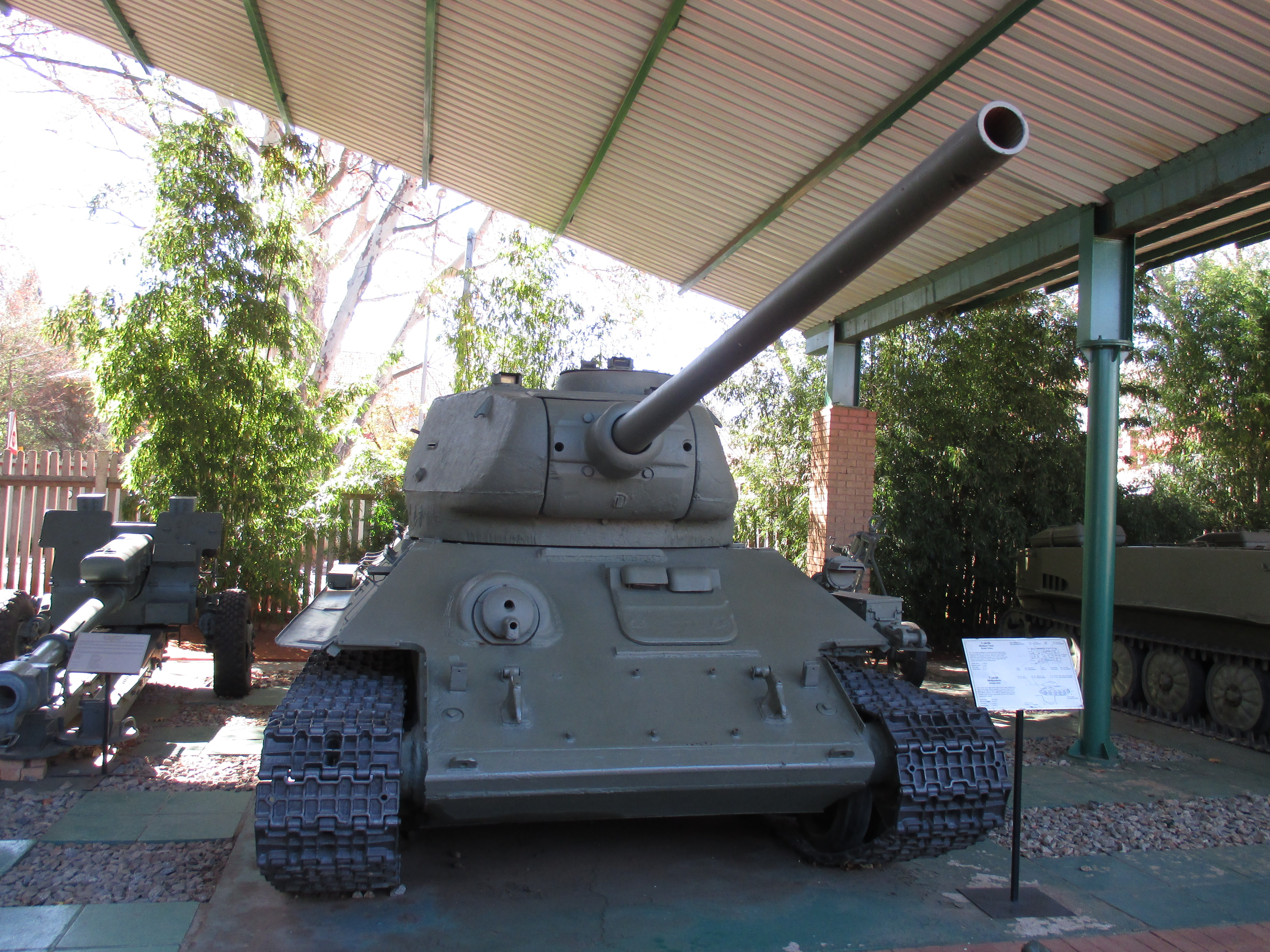
FAPLA T-34-85, one of several encountered by Elands during Operation Protea

South African forces advanced on 23 August, cutting Xangongo off from Ongiva and establishing a blocking force near Chicusse. They stormed into Xangongo at 1:25 PM the following day, though it was late afternoon before the battle intensified. This settlement was garrisoned by FAPLA's 19th Brigade, which included a T-34 company and mechanised squadron. Although Elands were vulnerable to the T-34's 85mm gun, their vastly superior mobility and the experience of SADF crews made a considerable difference. Three tanks had been demolished by late afternoon. Elands were also deployed with the blocking force on the main axis of the Xangongo-Cahama highway, where it was hoped that their speed on tarred surfaces could be better exploited. They did not have to wait long. In the evening a sizeable FAPLA convoy, consisting of armoured personnel carriers, infantry, and artillery, was glimpsed fleeing towards Cahama. Upon identifying the point vehicle as a BRDM-2, a South African spotter ordered "skiet hom met ‘n 90," ("shoot it with a 90[mm]"). Hit by three rounds, the vehicle ignited. A number of trailing BTR-152s, GAZ-66s, and BM-21s were also captured or destroyed.

The assault on Ongiva began with an air strike on 27 August, while artillery engaged in knocking out predetermined FAPLA or SWAPO targets. Angolan troops counterattacked on at least two occasions with T-34s, three of which were annihilated by concentrated fire from the Ratel or Eland-90 squadrons. In hindsight, tanks played a relatively limited role in the defence. Most had been dug in for use as static artillery - firing from entrenched positions near FAPLA camps and installations. This restricted their trajectory. Moreover, the T-34s faced south; their crews were thus unable to counter South African armoured cars arriving from the north.

==== Operation Askari ====
At the end of Operation Protea, South Africa had captured over 3,000 tonnes of ammunition, overrun some 38,850 square kilometres of Angolan territory, and inflicted serious casualties on SWAPO and FAPLA. Most significantly, the SADF installed its own garrisons at Xangongo and Ongiva - leaving behind two companies detached from the South West African Territorial Force (SWATF), an Eland squadron, and the special forces of 32 Battalion. Throughout 1982 Eland-90s were a common sight on the roads around Xangongo, deterring SWAPO from reentering the town.

By 1983, FAPLA had completed an exhaustive two-year retraining and reequipment programme, greatly increasing in size, sophistication, and competence under the eye of Soviet military advisors. Luanda was spending 35% of its budget on external defence, and Mikoyan MiG-21s were beginning to disrupt the traditional South African Air Force superiority. Within five months of Protea, Cuba had committed another 7,000 troops to Angola. They also brought T-54/55 tanks, which were more formidable than the antiquated T-34.

In April South Africa began compiling intelligence on SWAPO plans to move an additional 1,000 guerrillas into the operational area, using the Cunene rainy season for cover. Modelled after Protea, Operation Askari began on 20 December 1983: headed for insurgent staging areas identified by aerial reconnaissance, four battalion-sized combat groups crossed into Angola. Askari called for a single unit of Eland-90s, which were scraped together from Regiment Mooirivier and Regiment Molopo. Unlike past operations, their crews were predominantly reservists. The Elands were assigned to Task Force Victor, which was to acquire the unfortunate reputation of being Askari's poorest element. Marshalled against them were four FAPLA brigades stationed at Caiundo, Cuvelai, Mulondo, and Cahama, or one-seventh of the Angolan Army. Soviet commander Valentin Varennikov, who was instrumental in directing the Angolan defence, was confident that "given their numerical strength and armament, the brigades...[would] be able to repel any South African attack".

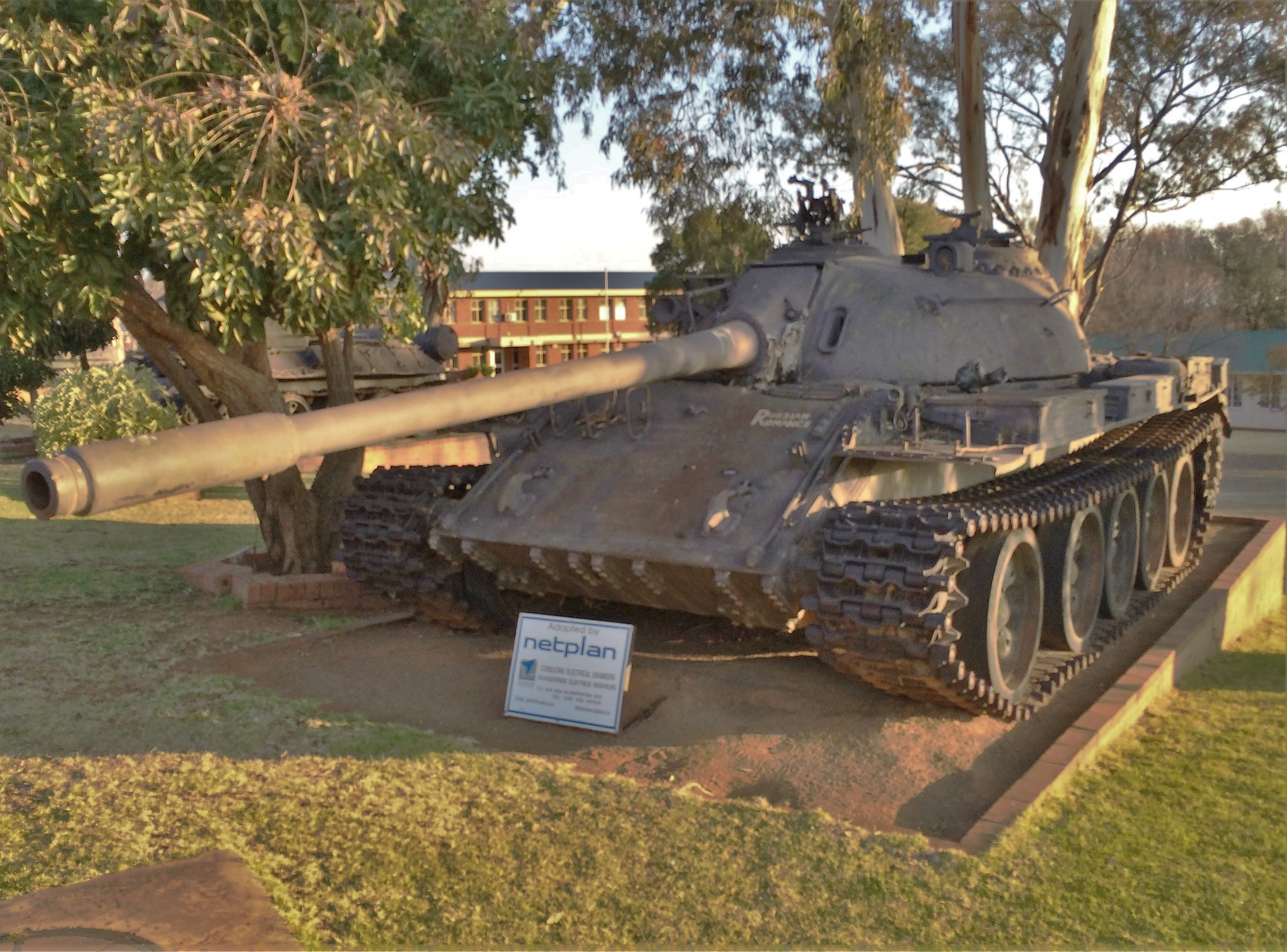
FAPLA T-55. Able to turn more sharply than the enemy tanks, Elands and Ratels used flanking manoeuvres to reach a T-54/55's rear

The SADF, however, had no intention of making frontal attacks that could be costly in lives or resources. Askari depended on being able to keep FAPLA at bay through air strikes, long-distance bombardment, and light probing. In keeping with this principle, Task Force Victor marched east through Mongua before harassing FAPLA's 11th Brigade at Cuvelai, their intended target. Angolan defenders responded with heavy artillery. A disappointed General Constand Viljoen warned that if no major successes were achieved before 31 December, the operation might not continue. But Cuvelai had been identified as a key location in SWAPO's upcoming monsoon offensive, and had to be neutralised before Victor could be withdrawn. A flurry of new orders were issued accordingly: probing actions were to cease, and the enemy attacked "forcefully" prior to the 31st. The SWAPO camps near the town were the objective: South African officers were confident that neither Angola nor two adjacent Cuban battalions nearby would intervene.

In line with his new directives, Victor commandant Faan Greyling was instructed to advance from the northeast. But this route was barred by the Cuvelai River, which was in flood and complicated by the heaviest rains in living memory. Predictably, the Elands got stuck as they struggled up the muddy banks of every stream. SWAPO was waiting for Victor in force behind artillery, sixteen minefields, and ZU-23-2 anti-aircraft guns. Faulty intelligence also complicated the attack: FAPLA did come to SWAPO's assistance with 13 T-55 tanks. As his men were poorly equipped with antitank weapons, Greyling's Eland-90s had to bear the brunt of the armoured thrust. (Note: This confrontation took place during the general assault on the morning of December 31, 1983. The Eland-90s involved were escorting an infantry company, call sign Juliet 19, just outside Cuvelai when they encountered the T-55s. South African and Soviet sources alike noted that several T-55s were penetrated by Eland-90 fire, presumably during this action, but did not elaborate on FAPLA's losses.) Their inadequate low velocity cannon had great difficulty against the T-55s, often dispensing multiple shells before penetrating the tanks' armour. Crew tactics were to encircle single tanks with an Eland troop (four cars) and keep on shooting until their target burned. This required intense coordination between the Eland commanders, who directed each other by radio until they were able to concentrate their fire on a T-55's exposed side or rear, preferably while its turret was pointed in another direction.

Sensing an opportunity to disengage, Greyling called off the attack, but it was too late. Exhausted by the intensity of the firefight and already demoralised by their repeated failures, the South Africans retreated. Headquarters demanded he resume the advance—Greyling retorted he would not do so without coherent planning or reconnaissance. It eventually fell to an overworked 61 Mechanised to complete the objective. Due to the higher profile of their Ratel-90s they could locate T-55s over dense vegetation before the Angolan gunners in turn spotted them, an advantage Elands did not possess. The armoured cars succeeded in knocking out at least five tanks on the river, which were captured and retained for inspection. South Africa finally took what was left of Cuvelai on January 7.

==== Later service ====
The mediocre performance of improvised tank destroyers at Cuvelai convinced Ep van Lill, commander of 61 Mechanised, that his men could no longer be asked to fight tanks with armoured cars. Van Lill informed General Viljoen that the Eland-90 simply could not stand up to the heavier protection and armament of T-54/55s. "Tank busting" expended too much 90mm ammunition and fatigued recoil systems. As demonstrated during Askari, crew morale was also affected when ordered to take on T-55s in their vulnerable vehicles. This contradicted South African Armoured Corps (SAAC) doctrine, which was to fight tanks with tanks.

A few weeks later, van Lill was vindicated when a squadron of British Centurions - modified in South Africa as the "Olifant Mk1" - were delivered to the 61 Mechanised base in Omuthiya. As Angola was not seen as a conventional threat to South West Africa itself, the retention of tanks in that territory was not regarded as cost-effective and Olifant crews frequently rotated out. During Operations Moduler, Hooper, and Packer, Ratel-90s were again used in the role of tank destroyers.

At SADF review meetings, the antiquity of the Eland was noted, which was beginning to hinder operations. It was not deployed in front-line service in Angola by the SADF again.

=== South West Africa ===
Although most Elands were gradually removed from front-line service with the SADF after 1984, being relegated to the role of training vehicles for Ratel-90 crews, a large number continued to be deployed by the SWATF during internal counter-insurgency operations against PLAN. The armoured cars frequently patrolled the roads to deter guerrilla raids and escorted local convoys. South Africa equipped the SWATF with a single regiment of Eland-90s and Eland-60s at its inception in 1980, drawing their crews from local national servicemen. The regiment rarely operated as a cohesive unit. Rather, its squadrons were attached on a rotating basis to a variety of modular infantry battalions. In concert with the supporting infantrymen, Eland crews carried out search and destroy operations, manned road patrols and road checkpoints, and guarded static installations.

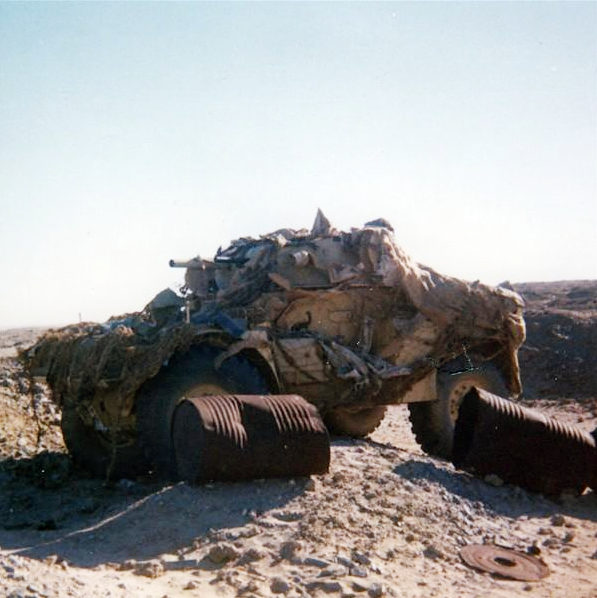
An Eland-60 concealed under camouflage netting in South West Africa

In August 1987, the SADF launched Operation Moduler to turn back a major FAPLA offensive in southern Angola, sparking the Battle of Cuito Cuanavale. During Moduler, the SWATF's 201 Battalion was ordered to deploy as far north as Ongiva and prevent Angolan units from re-occupying that settlement. For the purposes of this operation they were provided with an oversized squadron of Eland-90s. Most of the infantrymen were armed with a combination of anti-tank rifle grenades and RPG-7s in the event they needed to support the Elands against FAPLA tanks. Due to a shortage of troop-carrying vehicles, some were transported riding atop the armoured cars. They took up concealed positions on the road between Ongiva and Xangongo, and on October 5 a large FAPLA motorised contingent was sighted approaching the settlement, consisting primarily of truck-mounted infantry and a few BTR-60 and BTR-40 armoured personnel carriers. The advance was being screened by a reconnaissance troop of BRDM-2s, which blundered into the killzone and were engaged by the Eland-90s. While taking evasive action, one of the BRDMs drove off the road and collided with an Eland, causing momentary confusion. Most of the FAPLA column was destroyed in the ensuing firefight. Following this incident, FAPLA began deploying the more heavily armed BMP-1 infantry fighting vehicles for convoy support purposes in areas where it was likely to encounter South African armour.

The ambush on October 5 is not mentioned in official Soviet or FAPLA communiques. However, an Angolan state bulletin dated September 13 alludes to an unspecified attack by SADF or SWATF troops specifically involving Eland-90s and Eland-60s. It is unclear whether this is a reference to the same action, as FAPLA claimed the South African unit responsible was 32 Battalion, which was not deployed near Ongiva at the time and only equipped with Ratel-90s. According to the bulletin, four Elands were destroyed during that engagement. Soviet sources reference at least three Eland-90s knocked out during Operation Moduler and Operation Hooper. The first was observed by a road near the Chambinga river crossing on 17 November 1987, and had apparently suffered a catastrophic kill as a result of being impacted by a BM-21 rocket. The other two were reported as destroyed by FAPLA's 59 Brigade on 2 December 1987. These could only have been SWATF vehicles, as the Eland was no longer being actively used by the SADF; nevertheless, they do not appear among the losses acknowledged as a result of Moduler and Hooper.

SWATF Elands were mobilised again as part of Operation Hilti to counter a division of Cuban troops massing near the South West African border in mid 1988. The Cuban forces were believed to possess a brigade-sized formation of T-55 and T-62 tanks, which the SWATF would find difficult to deter with its outnumbered and obsolete Eland fleet. On 24 June, the SWATF and SADF retreated south after clashing with the Cuban tanks advancing on Cuamato, just north of the border. The following day, twelve Eland-90s were deployed to Cuamato to help 201 Battalion stop the tanks. However, the anticipated Cuban attack did not materialise, and the armoured cars were subsequently withdrawn without incident. Three were detached to safeguard the hydroelectric dam at Calueque, while the others returned to South West Africa. One was destroyed in an air strike by Cuban Mikoyan-Gurevich MiG-23s just outside Calueque on 27 June.

=== Rhodesia ===
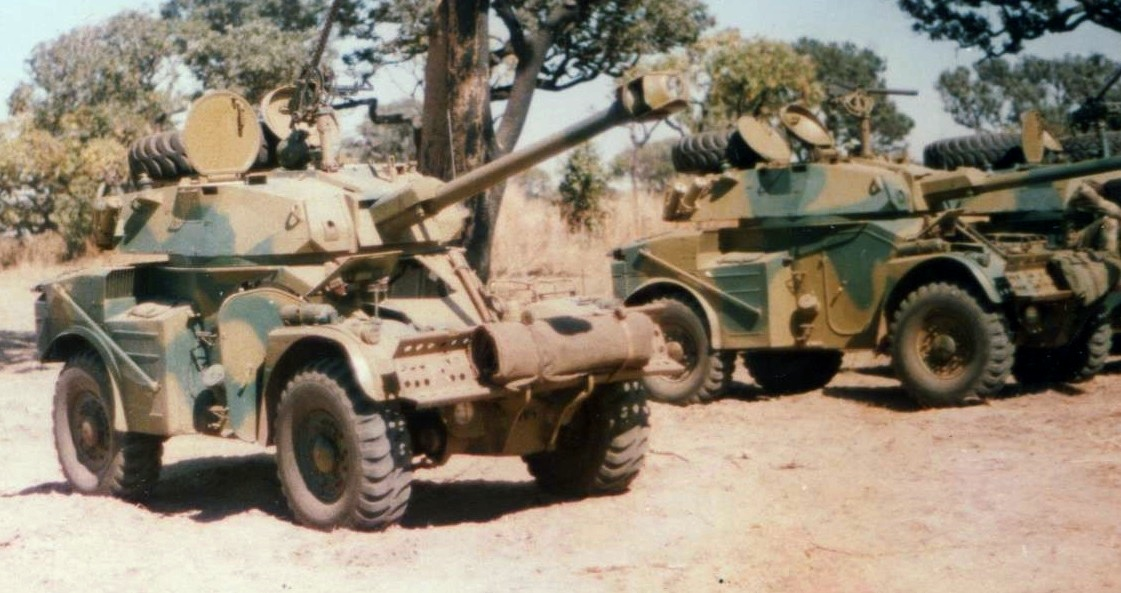
Eland-90 Mk6s of the Rhodesian Armoured Car Regiment in 1979

Rhodesia waged a long and bitter counter-insurgency campaign against two rival insurgent armies, the Zimbabwe African National Liberation Army (ZANLA) and the Zimbabwe People's Revolutionary Army (ZIPRA), from 1965 to 1980. From the beginning of the war, the Rhodesian Air Force was perturbed by the likelihood of insurgent saboteurs disrupting fuel depots, forward airfields, and other installations vital to its operational capabilities. In 1971, the Rhodesian Air Force Security Training Unit (STU) was established for base security duties. The STU was trained and equipped by the South African government, which provided it with radios, small arms and ammunition, and basic weapons instruction. Requests for new equipment were made through a liaison officer attached to the Rhodesian Special Branch, who overheard an airman demand, perhaps in jest, "a dozen armoured cars please" when he asked the STU if there was anything else he could procure for them. This was interpreted and approved as an official request, and by the end of year twelve Eland-60s had been delivered by rail to the STU. The deployment of these armoured cars subsequently became an integral part of the unit's doctrine.

The Elands gave much-needed mobility to STU personnel and allowed them to take part in responding quickly to insurgent raids, particularly one well-planned ZANLA assault on Grand Reef Air Base in 1978. They were dug into fixed revetments while on static guard duty, but also carried out routine patrols before each aircraft landed. At one point, it was standard practice at New Sarum for at least one Eland-60 crew to circle the airfield and check for suspicious activity or any other irregularities before an aircraft landed. During an insurgent raid, the Eland-60s would emerge from their revetments and intercept the attackers, providing much-needed fire support and firing illumination rounds to pinpoint insurgents for the dismounted security personnel.

The first STU Eland crews underwent a twelve-week training programme in Bloemfontein with the South African Armoured Corps, but subsequent intakes were trained locally. The armoured cars were all initially deployed in a single squadron at New Sarum Air Base, where their crews were mockingly referred to as “Desert Rats”, in reference to a popular nickname for British tank crews serving with the 7th Armoured Division in North Africa during World War II. The STU later embraced this mascot and adopted “Desert Mice” as an informal callsign for the Eland-60 squadron. Its motto, “Seek and Squeak”, parodied the “Seek and Strike” maxim of the RhAF's No. 4 Squadron.

The Rhodesian Armoured Car Regiment (RhACR), originally formed as part of the British Empire's war effort in 1941, was reactivated in 1972 and equipped with Ferret scout cars. However, the Ferrets were in delipidated condition, having been inherited by Rhodesia from the British Forces Aden after seeing several years of hard use in the Aden Emergency. The Ferret design also lacked the firepower to be truly effective against hardened ground targets and dug-in insurgents, being armed with just a single general-purpose machine gun. Following a failed project to increase the Ferret's firepower by the addition of a 20mm autocannon, the Rhodesian government turned to South Africa, which offered to supply RhACR with Eland-90s. The first sixteen Eland-90s were delivered to the regiment in 1975. More Eland-90s were successively donated or loaned to the RhACR until 1979, and the earlier Eland Mk5s replaced by Mk6s. Estimates of the total number of Eland-90s in service with the Rhodesian Army by late 1979 range from 30 to 60. Eventually, four composite Eland-90 and Ferret squadrons were formed: A, B, and C squadrons were strictly reserve formations, while D squadron was a regular unit. The reserve squadrons were attached to the "independent companies" of the Rhodesia Regiment on an ad hoc basis, and were the first to be mobilised for cross-border raids on the insurgents' external base camps in neighbouring Mozambique.

For the most part, the RhACR Eland-90s were utilised in the internal security and convoy escort role. The armoured cars were deployed at army roadblocks and frequently patrolled the borders to deter insurgent infiltrators. In the event of a conventional conflict, the Eland-90s were to be used in their secondary role of conventional reconnaissance vehicles. Their light armour protection was always a concern for the Rhodesian crews, particularly after trials proved that the Eland's hull could be penetrated by armour-piercing 7.62×39mm rounds. Problems with the clutches were also encountered, which led to all the RhACR's Elands being retrofitted with new clutches adopted from the army's Land Rover utility vehicles.

All the Elands supplied to Rhodesia were fitted with number plates registered to the South African Police, which had a presence on Rhodesia's northern border. This measure was initiated to maintain some form of deniability and keep South Africa's role in arming the Rhodesian Security Forces covert. However, the Rhodesians abandoned the façade after the last South African police officers were recalled from that country in 1976. Another South African condition made unenforceable by the departure of the police was that the Elands were not to be deployed outside Rhodesia; after 1976 this was routinely ignored and the vehicles were used in external operations as needed. During Operation Miracle in 1979, Rhodesian Eland-90s spearheaded an assault on "Monte Cassino", a heavily fortified ZANLA complex at New Chimoio, Mozambique. The Mozambicans responded by counterattacking with a T-54 tank company, supported by mechanised infantry in BTR-152 armoured personnel carriers. The Rhodesian forces managed to disperse the tanks with artillery and air strikes without committing their armoured cars.

=== Zimbabwe ===
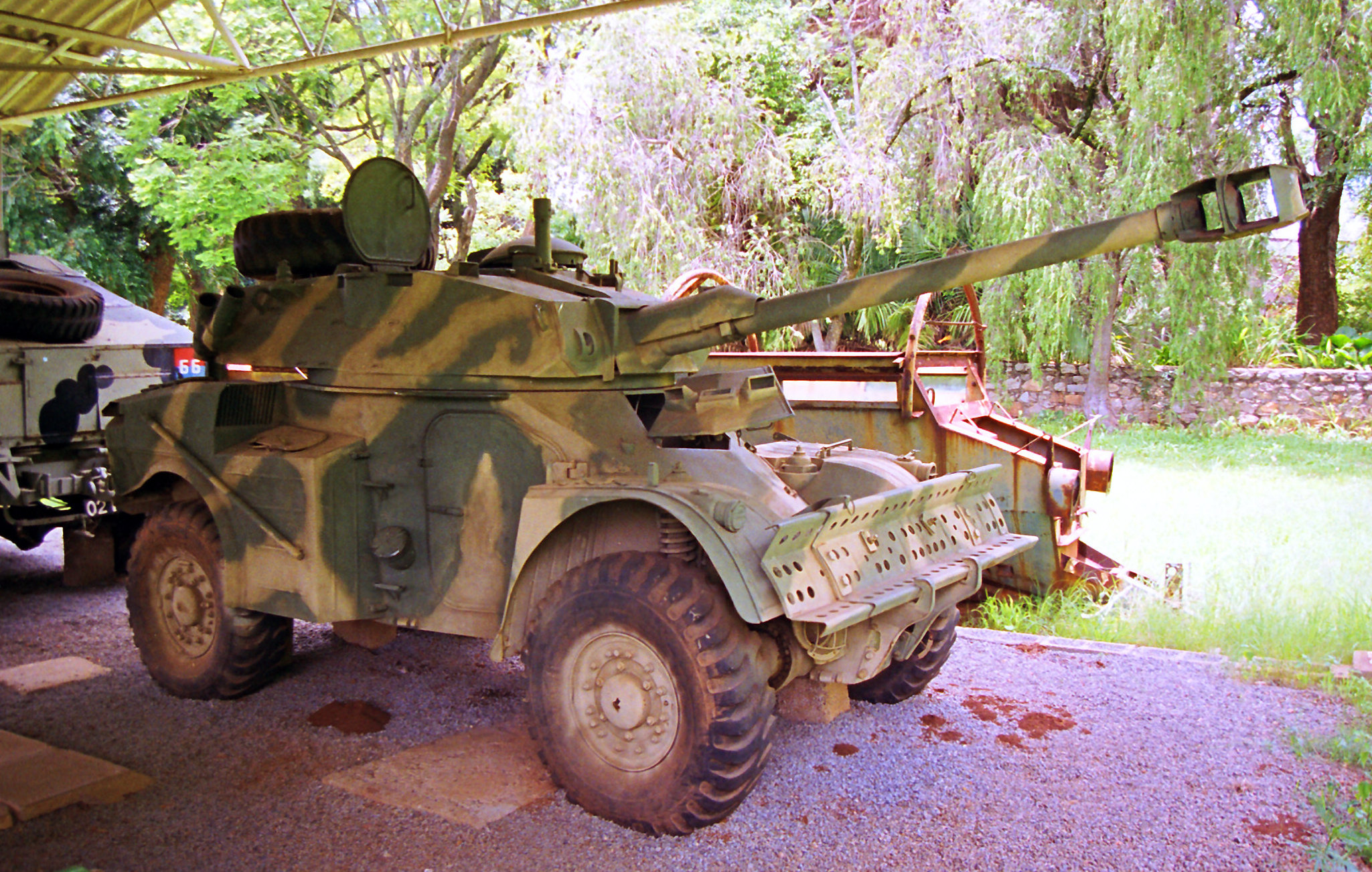
Eland-90 in Zimbabwean tigerstripe camouflage. What its firepower could do to the thinly armoured BTR-152 was gruesomely demonstrated at Entumbane in 1981.

As Rhodesian hopes for an eminent victory in the bush war quickly faded in the wake of Operation Miracle, the government acceded to a constitutional conference, mediated by the United Kingdom, with the senior insurgent leadership. The conference concluded after forty-seven plenary sessions with agreements on a phased political transition, a constitutional conference including the insurgent factions, and a ceasefire on 15 December 1979. Recognising that its Rhodesian allies were politically moribund, the South African government began withdrawing its support. It also demanded the return of the Eland armoured cars and hundreds of FN MAG machine guns supplied to Rhodesia on ostensibly permanent loan. A senior general officer in the Rhodesian Army was appointed to make the necessary arrangements. Just prior to the country's 1980 elections, the STU Eland-60s were driven directly across the border. Most of the RhACR Eland-90s were loaded onto tank transporters and trucked back to South Africa as well. However, this process had not yet been completed when the political transition period ended and Rhodesia obtained internationally recognised sovereignty as Zimbabwe, under a new regime dominated by the former insurgent leadership. The repatriation of the armoured cars was abruptly terminated, leaving a handful of Eland-90s in the possession of the fledgling Zimbabwe National Army (ZNA). The number of Elands inherited by the ZNA is disputed, with some sources citing sixteen and others twenty-eight.

The SADF had no desire to leave the Eland-90s in the hands of a potentially hostile regime, and was implicated in a plot to destroy the armoured cars. SADF intelligence operatives sabotaged the fuel tanks of the Eland-90s and a number of other vehicles parked at King George VI Barracks in Harare with timed explosive devices in December 1980. The explosives were discovered when two detonated prematurely after becoming saturated by petrol. ZNA engineers disarmed and removed the remaining devices, albeit with some difficulty, as the Elands' turrets had to be removed to access their fuel tanks.

Zimbabwe was ravaged by inter-factional clashes between ex-ZANLA and ZIPRA militants between 1980 and 1981. Being relatively neutral in the dispute, the former Rhodesian Armoured Car Regiment was seen as a prime candidate for restoring order. In January 1981, a troop of four Eland-90s manned by national serviceman and led by Sergeant "Skippy" Devine was dispatched to keep the peace in Bulawayo, where rival ZANLA and ZIPRA units were encamped pending their integration into the national army's 13th infantry battalion. The following month, the ZIPRA troops across Bulawayo revolted in what became known as the 1981 Entumbane uprising. On February 8, the armoured cars charged the mutineers' camp at Glenville and overran it with little resistance. Three days later, ZIPRA reinforcements in the form of a motorized column led by BTR-152 armoured vehicles and possibly including T-34-85 tanks was spotted approaching Bulawayo. Devine was ordered to intercept and destroy them. The Eland-90s promptly identified and knocked out a BTR at an outlying intersection. Taking up positions on the high ground overlooking Selborne Avenue, they stayed in place until two more BTRs attacked, firing indiscriminately with DShK machine guns. Both were destroyed by 90mm shells at two hundred metres. Devine's Eland-90s knocked out a fourth BTR mere hours later. The ZIPRA tanks were later found abandoned near the road; none were in fighting condition. Devine was awarded the Bronze Cross of Zimbabwe for his actions at Entumbane.

After 1980, the former Rhodesian Armoured Car Regiment, now part of the Zimbabwe Armoured Corps, was reduced to a single regular squadron of Eland-90s. The Zimbabwean Ministry of Defence wanted to bring the regiment up to its pre-1980 strength of four squadrons, one to complement each of the ZNA's four infantry brigades. From 1984 onwards, the Eland-90 was largely superseded in front-line service by the heavier, six-wheeled EE-9 Cascavel, which was adopted in sufficient numbers to form the three additional armoured car squadrons. A proposal to retrofit the ZNA Elands with upgraded 90mm guns and turrets was discussed but never reached fruition. In Zimbabwean service, the armoured cars suffered from a dwindling supply of spare parts and erratic maintenance. Some were still in service as late as the Second Congo War.

=== Western Sahara War ===
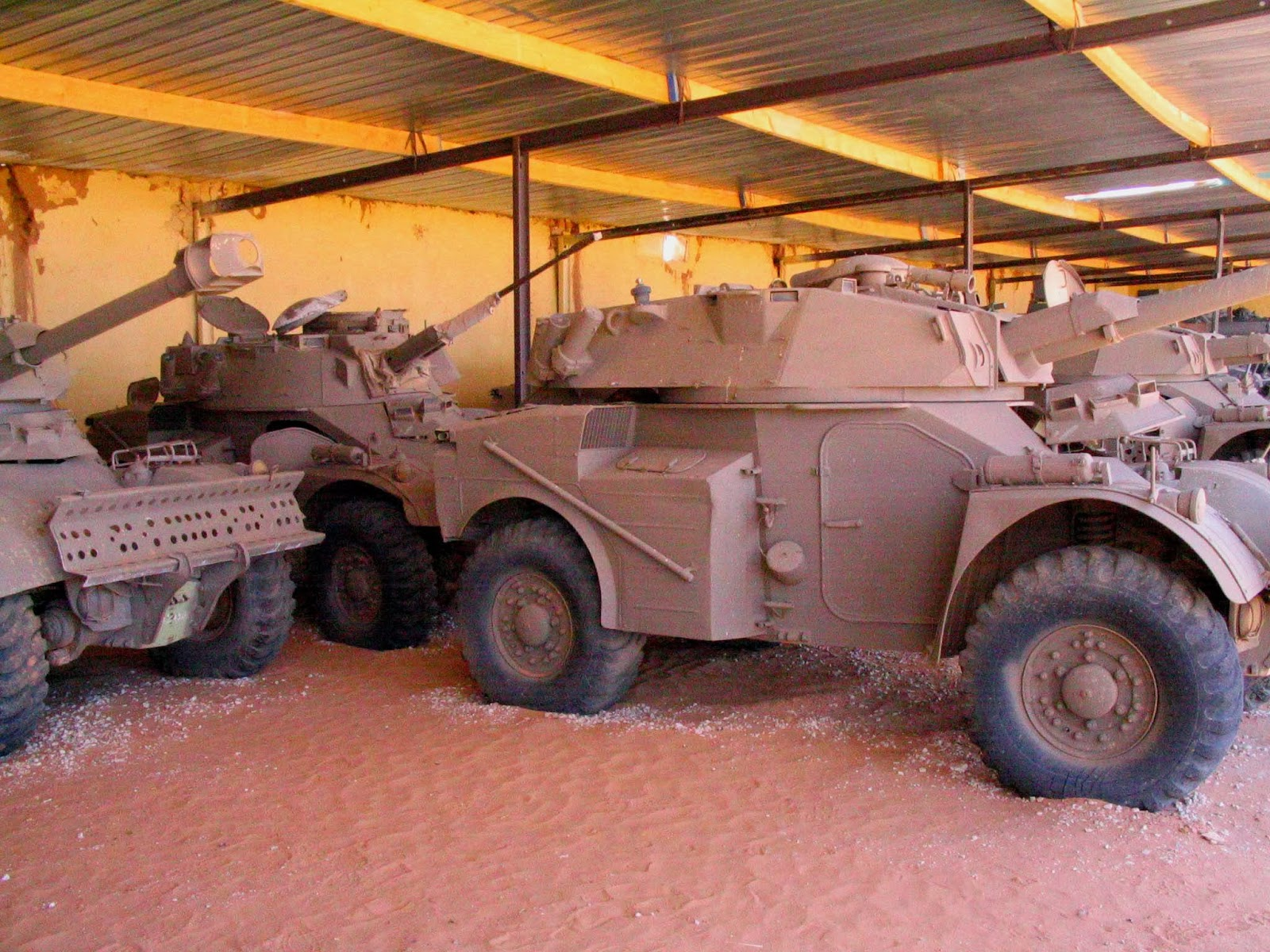
Captured Moroccan Elands in the Polisario Military Museum, Algeria. Note the Eland-20 to the left.

Prior to the outbreak of the Western Sahara War, the Royal Moroccan Armed Forces (FAR) received relatively little modern armament, particularly from non-Francophone states. Meanwhile, the Polisario Front, intent on waging an armed struggle for Sahrawi independence, had stockpiled weapons from Algeria and seized additional equipment during raids on Moroccan forces. The hardware attrition rate spiralled upwards after the Madrid Accords and it quickly became apparent that new suppliers were needed to fill the bulk of FAR's needs. A gradual arms buildup in the Sahara began in 1976. Financial assistance from Saudi Arabia allowed Rabat to tap a broad supply network: weaponry was obtained as far abroad as Iran, West Germany, and Belgium. Orders for Panhard AML-90s were placed with France; although some did arrive in second-hand condition, Panhard had long closed its production line and referred Morocco to South Africa. The first Eland Mk6s were imported in 1976. Others appeared with Ratels in the FAR after 1978. They were accompanied by eight South African instructors for training Moroccan crews, though other personnel were expressly forbidden to approach them.

Morocco grew more concerned with each successive FAR setback, and in September 1979 General Ahmed Dlimi adopted a new strategy of consolidating the forces spread out across Western Sahara. Individual garrisons were mustered into tactical groups for massed search and destroy operations against Polisario guerrillas menacing Dakhla, Zag, and Tarfaya. FAR's Elands were first sighted during Operation Imam, one such attempt to break the encirclement of Zag. The Moroccan crews proceeded through a narrow valley against the counsel of their South African instructors, who correctly suspected a Polisario ambush. A large guerrilla force was able to trap and cut off the column of armoured cars in the valley. Over 30 Elands were captured during the failed offensive and some were destroyed. Domestic markings had been censored prior to export, but the vehicles were identified by an Afrikaans inscription on their intact fill caps. Eland-90s remained a notable feature in El Aaiún's anniversary parades for several years to come.

=== Other conflicts ===
South Africa supplied 40 Elands of unknown designation to the Ugandan People's Defence Force in the mid-1990s, along with Buffel mine-protected troop carriers. The armoured cars likely entered service during the Second Congo War, and may have seen action with Ugandan armour at Kisangani. They were later deployed against the Lord's Resistance Army. Local media also published reports that Nelson Mandela's administration offered Elands to Pascal Lissouba before his loyalists were defeated by Angolan invaders in the Republic of the Congo Civil War. These claims could not be independently verified. Another source maintains that the original Congo order was placed in 1994 and only one was delivered.

At least 100 Eland-90s and 20 Eland-60s were emptied from SANDF surplus in 1999 and handed to a Belgian defence contractor (Sabiex) for resale. In September 2006, it emerged that President Idriss Déby of Chad was negotiating their purchase. The first 40 were delivered via France on March 3, 2007, and soon blooded in the fighting against a rebel faction encroaching on Adré. While Belgium reported the 1999 deal to the United Nations Register of Conventional Arms, it neglected to offer any details regarding Chad. Sabiex could neither confirm nor deny the sale to Amnesty International. The Wallonia Directorate for Arms Licences merely recalled authorising export to a buyer in France, without any restrictions as to further sales or transfers. Chad has since used its Elands on routine patrols near the Sudanese border, and against Islamic radicals in northern Mali.

Because the Eland is regarded as a cheap alternative to improvised technicals in areas where climate, terrain, and lack of support infrastructure or technical skill forestall the operation of large heavy armour forces, it has remained popular with sub-Saharan armies and insurgent groups.

== Description ==
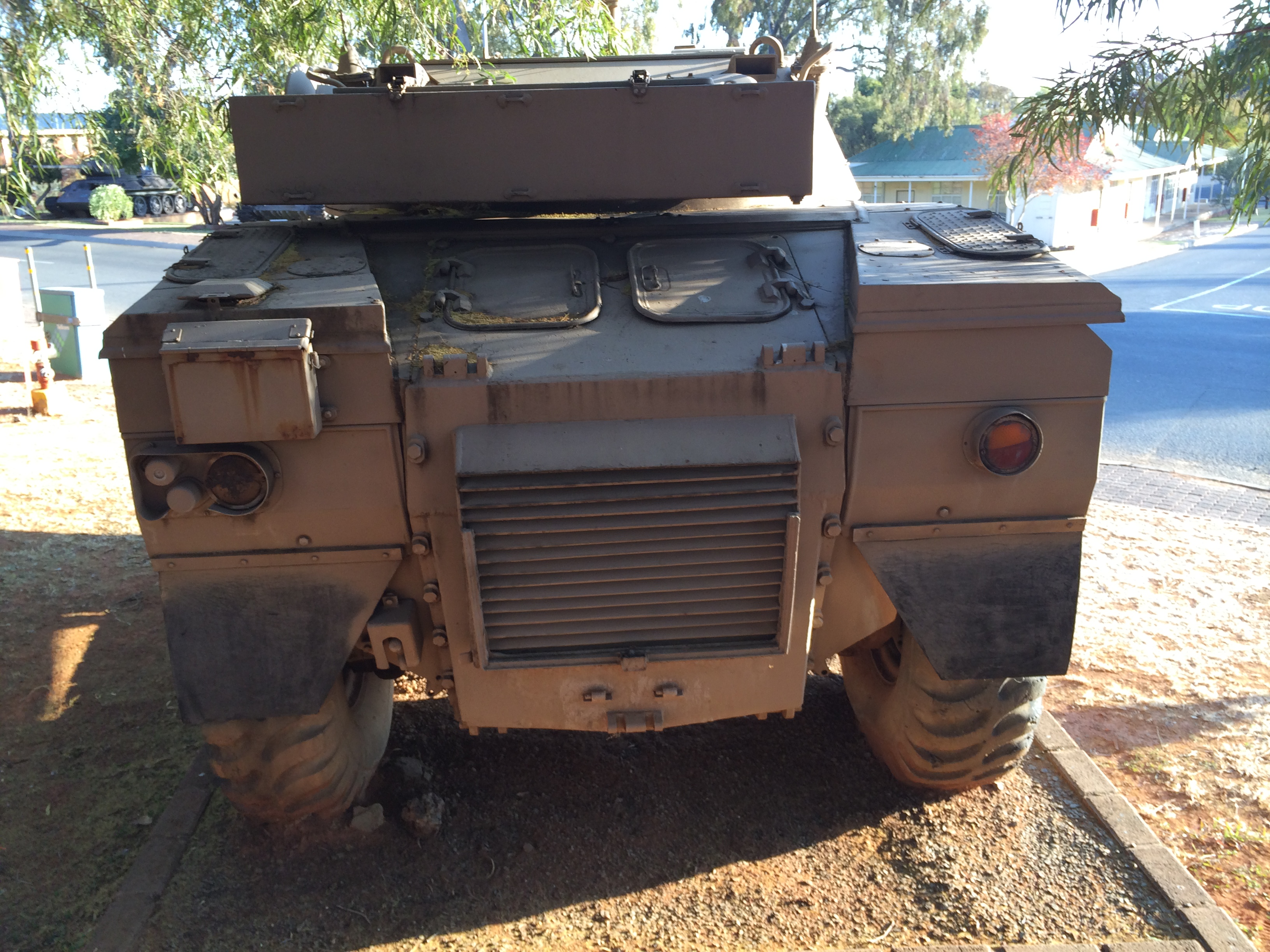
Rear of an Eland Mk7. The engine compartment is a recognisably South African feature.

Eland hulls are constructed of a welded homogenous steel that provides moderate protection against grenade fragments, antipersonnel mines, and light weapons. The driver is seated at the front of the vehicle and is provided with a one-piece hatch cover that swings to the right. He has a total of three integral periscopes, which may be replaced by passive infrared or night vision equipment for driving in darkness. The turret is in the centre of the hull, where two other crew members are alternatively seated by variant. The rear power plant is completely enclosed in the hull with air intake and exhaust openings safeguarded through a ballistic grille conceding unrestricted air passage.

An Eland's gearbox has one reverse and six forward gears. It is crosswise, coupled to both sides of the bevel pinion. Drive is transmitted from the gearbox to two lateral transfer boxes via pinions to the rear wheels and drive shafts that follow the hull to the front wheels. The shafts have extra universal joints beneath the turret. Each shaft drives a second cam type differential which bar either of the two wheel pairs from exerting a speed radically different from the other. In this respect Elands are less likely to experience transmission fouls and tyre wear than other armoured cars with a single central differential. The Panhard electric clutch, a major stumbling block for inexperienced drivers, has been replaced by a more concurrent hydraulic system for easier maintenance and reduced crew training time.

Also noteworthy is the independent suspension consisting of coil springs and hydropneumatic shock absorbers on trailing arms in the wheel mechanism; South Africa later adopted this design for the Rooikat. All four wheels are of the split rim type and fitted with Dunlop 12.00x20 tyres. There are two hydraulic braking systems, one for the front and one for the rear.

=== External ===
A squat, four wheeled, vehicle, the Eland slopes downwards at the front and less prominently at the rear. There are large semicircular wheel arches, which are obscured by storage bins adjacent to each rear wheel. Sand channels are stowed across the front of the hull, with headlamps located on either side of the towing shackle, beneath the channels. There are three periscopes over the driver's position. Turrets are shallow and rounded, with sloping sides and a prominent sighting periscope to the right. There is a domed cupola over the commander's hatch.

== Variants ==
=== Eland-60 ===
Modelled after Panhard's AML HE-60-7, the Eland-60 was the first Eland variant to enter service. It is armed with twin 7.62mm machine guns on the left and a single 60mm mortar on the right. Unlike its French predecessor, only one machine gun is mounted coaxially in the turret. A second was typically carried on a pintle for anti-aircraft use. The mortar has an elevation of +75° and a depression of -11°. A single type of mortar is available: the Hotckiss-Brandt CM60A1, produced under licence as the Model K1. It can be fired on a flat trajectory and is effective up to 300 metres in the direct role, or 1,700 metres in the indirect role. No more than 56 rounds of 60mm and 3,800 rounds of 7.62mm ammunition are carried. South African crews usually stored 44 mortar bombs per vehicle.

Eland-60s have a rounded turret with a large, dual-piece, hatch cover opening front and rear.

=== Eland-90 ===
Modelled after Panhard's AML H-90, the Eland-90 functioned as a fire support platform and assault gun. In this role it was easy to underestimate. During combat against tanks, its biggest edge was superior mobility, although this was diminished somewhat by the lack of a stabilised cannon. The armoured cars were often decisively outranged by the Angolan tanks, and their inability to fire on the move resulted in a poor rate of engagement. Eland-90s are equipped with a Denel GT-2 90mm gun; a coaxial 7.62mm machine gun is also mounted to the left of the main armament. The GT-2 has an elevation of +15° and a depression of -8°. Turret rotation is manual and takes approximately twenty seconds. A gunner is seated on the right and has a one-piece hatch cover. The loader or commander is on the left of the gun and a single hatch cover provided for the commander. Total ammunition capacity is 29 rounds of 90mm and 2,400 rounds of 7.62mm.

When needed, Eland-90s could accommodate two ENTAC or SS.11 missiles, both of which slide out of external rails to be launched.

=== Eland-20 ===
The Eland-20 was a base Ratel's turret atop the Eland chassis. It is fitted with a 7.62mm machine gun and 20mm GI-2 (M963 F2) autocannon offering an elevation of +38° and a depression of -8°. The 20mm cannon has a cyclic rate of fire of 750 rounds per minute. If required, another 7.62mm machine gun can be mounted on the turret roof.

Destined for export, Eland-20s were marketed primarily to Morocco. At least 18 of Ireland's AMLs were also upgraded to this standard by South Africa and redesignated "AML H-20".

=== Other variants ===
In 1994, an Eland was showcased with a turbocharged diesel four-cylinder powerpack developing 103 hp at 4,000 rpm. This was mounted on a sliding frame to facilitate easier engine removal and maintenance. Apart from the new engine, other changes were made to enhance performance in tropical climates. These included modified air conditioning and cooling systems. Reumech OMC—then a subsidiary of Vickers—marketed the design as Eland Mk7 Diesel Turbocharged, or simply "Eland Mk7 DT". An estimated 200 Mk7s were haggled from the SANDF for diesel conversion.

Mechanology Design Bureau, another South African firm, has proposed removing the Eland-90's turret altogether and replacing it with a giant cupola. This relieves ground pressure considerably, allowing for the installation of a specialised electronic reconnaissance suite. A similar upgrade was proposed for the Eland-60, although the latter retains its original turret.

Several foreign companies currently offer extensive rebuild or overhaul programmes for the Eland, particularly with regards to improving engine performance and reliability. Saymar, an Israeli firm, has proposed a modified Eland with a two-litre Toyota diesel engine developing 76 kW (102 hp). Another upgrade programme is being marketed by Belgium's Sabiex International, which includes the complete refurbishment of the vehicle's transmission, electrical system, and drive train.

Various demonstrators have been built at the SANDF School of Armour utilising an Eland drive train, suspension, or chassis. Examples include an armoured personnel carrier resembling the Panhard M3 and an 8X8 Rooikat prototype.

== Armament and ammunition ==
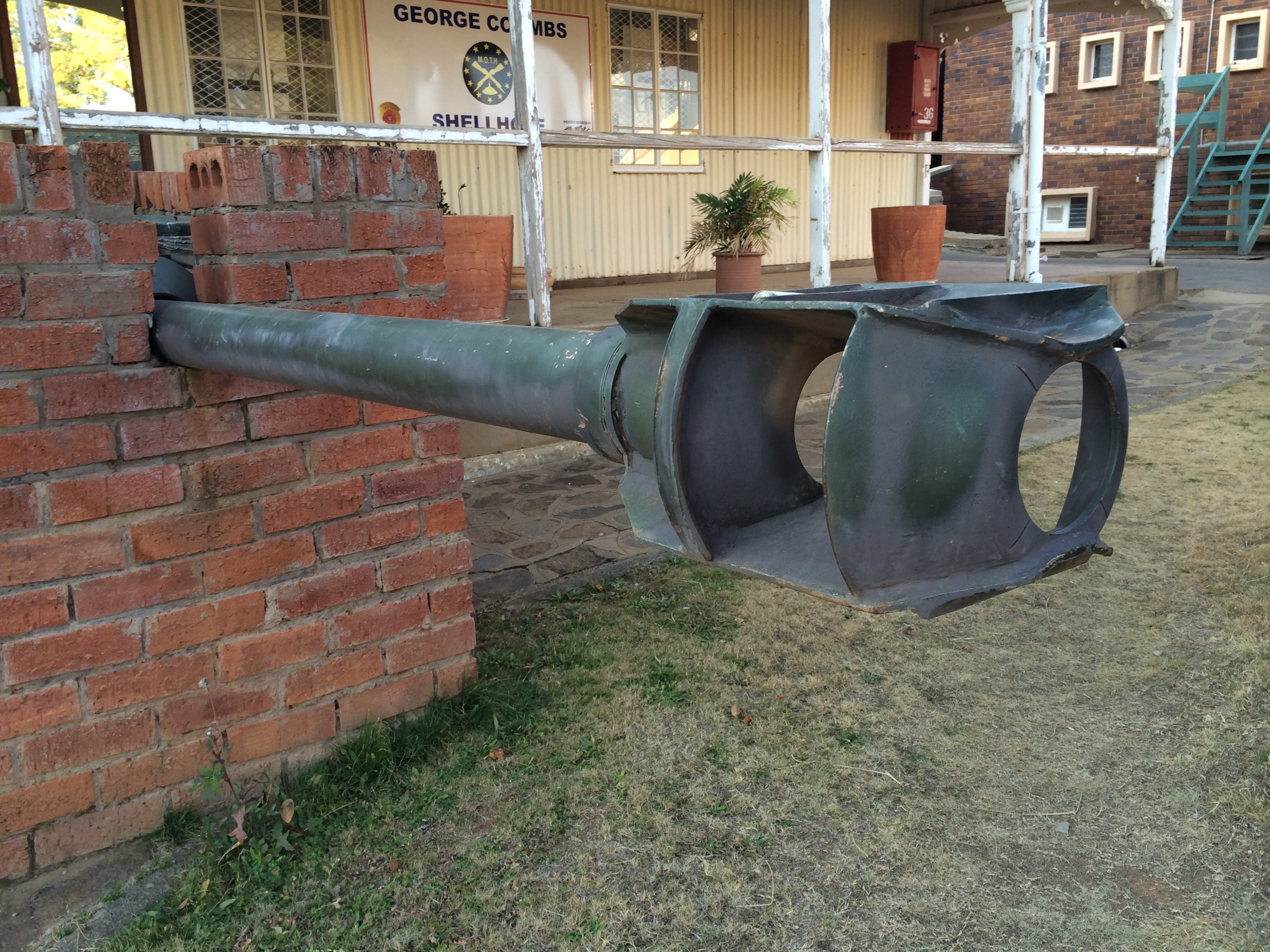
90 mm GT-2 barrel and muzzle brake displayed in front of the George Coombs M.O.T.H Shellhole, formerly located at the School of Armour.

The modular design of Eland weapon systems allowed Sandock-Austral to update or downgrade armament with ease according to prospective clients' wishes. Ranging is manual and Eland-90s assisted by a non-stabilised optical fire control system.

Like the AML, the Eland is equipped with a two-person turret. The original Eland-60 had an unusual combination of the 60mm K1 mortar and two medium, or one heavy, machine guns - a combination inspired by French experiences in the Algerian War. The mortar weighs 75 kg and is 1.8 metres long. Maximum effective range of the K1 as produced by Denel Land Systems is stated to be 1,700 metres. An Eland-60 was always present in every South African support troop due to the effectiveness of its illumination bombs during night operations.

It was the SAAC which first recommended an AML with heavier armament: they were then looking for a fire support platform to complement the Alvis Saracen. Due to parts compatibility the Alvis Saladin was an obvious initial choice. Nevertheless, the AML licence had already been purchased, so there were obvious advantages in filling the same role with an existing vehicle. Panhard's response was the AML H-90.

The 90mm Denel GT-2 gun, which fires fin-stabilised high-explosive (HE) and high-explosive anti-tank (HEAT) projectiles, is heavier than that mounted in the Saladin and provides the Eland with a very potent form of armament, considering its small size and speed. It weighs 380 kg and has a double baffle muzzle brake. With the muzzle brake, it measures 4.1 metres in length. Low-angled rifling is used in the barrel. The breech of the gun is semi-automatic and fitted with a vertical sliding wedge breech block. The firing mechanism utilises a mechanical firing pin which was prone to sticking and malfunction in dusty climates. There is also a recoil control mechanism consisting of a single cylinder with a constant stress spring and a hydropneumatic recuperator designed to return the GT-2 to its original firing position. This process entailed releasing oil into a nitrogen reservoir as the gun recoiled upon firing. Oil levels and the nitrogen pressure had to be monitored frequently; if neither was sufficient turret crews were forced to physically manhandle their gun back into position. During the 1970s, the recoil systems in all the Eland-90s were modified to allow the gun to be fired in all directions from the fully traversing turret without the risk of knocking the extremely lightweight armoured car over. In theory, these modifications also permitted the gun to be fired while the vehicle was in forward motion, although crews were prohibited from doing so due to the likelihood of transmission damage.

South Africa began producing its own 90mm ammunition in large quantities after French high-explosive rounds were blamed for causing stoppages in Eland-90s during Operation Reindeer.

Eland-90 ammunition
Type	Model	Weight, kg (cartridge/projectile)	Filler	Muzzle velocity, m/s
HEAT-T	OCC F1	7.077 / 3.65	RDX/TNT, 670g	760
HEAT-TP	TP-T BSCC 90 F1	7.077 / 3.65	Aluminum, tracer	760
HE	OE F1	8.662 / 5.27	RDX/TNT, 945g	650
WP-SMK	OFUM F1	9.07 / 5.4	White phosphorus, 800g	650
Canister	Canister GT-2	-	1100 lead spheres, 4 kg	450
Blank	Blank cartridge, 90mm F1 with shortened primer	3.4 / -	-	-

Maximum effective range of the Denel GT-2 is stated to be 2,200 metres (HE). The HEAT-T round will penetrate 320mm of armour at a zero angle of incidence or 150mm of armour at a 60° angle of incidence. A locally manufactured fin-stabilised, shaped charged, projectile was also under development in 1976. The complete round weighs 7 kg of which the projectile itself weighs 3.65 kg. The complete round is 654mm in length with the projectile being 500mm in length. This round has an m/v of 750 m/s and a maximum velocity of 760 m/s, and effective range is given as 1,200 metres.

== Doctrine ==
The Eland's first combat deployment to the Caprivi Strip revealed major flaws in South African armour doctrine. Firstly, the SAAC learned that significant swathes of Namibian (and Angolan) terrain were not ideal conditions for military vehicles. Caprivi had thick bush which restricted movement, turret traverse, and visibility. It also confounded textbook formations. Second, Eland crews were trained on the arid flats of Bloemfontein and Walvis Bay. The conditions they encountered were quite unlike anything the SADF had prepared them for.

Much was learned from Elands' performance in Operation Savannah. Their ability to move so swiftly over tar and packed gravel surprised FAPLA on multiple occasions. They were also rather silent; a quiet petrol engine enabled stealth during ambush or evasive manoeuvres. Furthermore, the Eland-90 proved that it was powerful enough to defeat the heaviest armour ranged against it, the Soviet T-34. Savannah was the SAAC's first experience of mobile warfare in the Angolan bush, creating a laboratory where new tactics could be tested.

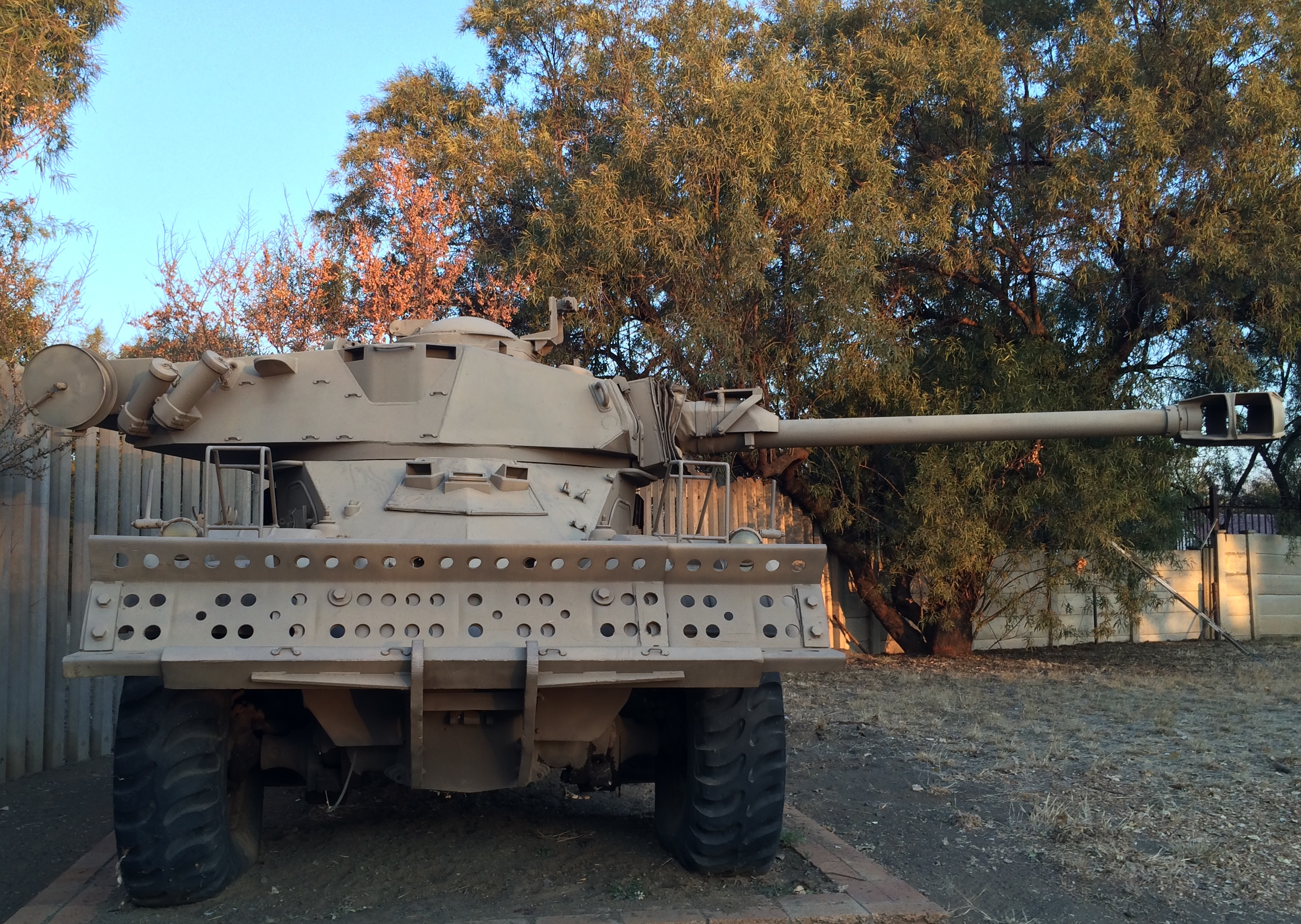
The Eland possessed the greatest power-to-weight ratio of any vehicle in the SADF

According to the South African Military College at Voortrekkerhoogte, which clearly recognised the Eland's weakness in attrition warfare, SADF doctrine was to be "based on not to hold ground but to create the design of battle in such a way that you would lure the enemy into killing ground and then [with] the superiority of fire and movement, you would kill him completely." Factors such as rapid movement, striking from the flank, surprise and confusing the enemy with continuous manoeuvring thus became integral components in the new SAAC. That Voortrekkerhoogte was worried about the Eland's light construction was apparent. It subsequently issued a requirement for a "heavy armoured car" and grafted support infantry into the existing squadrons to deal with the threat posed by RPGs. Due to lack of space in an Eland to accommodate support troops, infantry mobility vehicles were called for. The SADF experimented with Land Rovers, Bedford RLs, and Unimog trucks before United Nations Security Council Resolution 418 further limited their choices. There were logistical incentives for adopting the Panhard M3, which shared many interchangeable parts with the Elands, but this notion was rejected: Pretoria wanted a true MRAP. After dozens of trials and modifications the Buffel was finally born.

Eland squadrons operated on the troop (platoon) level in operational areas: one was assigned to virtually every major settlement (i.e. Rucana, Ondangwa, Eenhana, Katima Mulilo, etc.). There were four Elands in a troop - Bravo Car, Alpha Car, Charlie Car, and Delta Car. Alpha and Charlie were the troop sergeant and leader respectively. Bravo was always an Eland-60. Delta was the additional option: either a second Eland-60 or a support infantry Buffel. This provided an excellent mix of direct and indirect fire to troop commanders. Bravo could release illumination bombs for night attacks or create a smokescreen. Charlie and Alpha laid down suppressive fire. If present Delta infantry debussed and attacked on foot from the nine o'clock position. Communication in the troop was essential, as fire had to be lifted once Delta moved to target.

The armoured car troop was expected to operate independently. Its own crews carried out repair and recovery with limited resources. Operations were dictated by the amount of fuel, ammunition, water and ration that could be carried per vehicle. The Eland's easy maintenance allowed them to operate on makeshift repairs in the field for up to seven days, hunting SWAPO cadres by day and forming open laagers by night.

One of the first major breakthroughs of the late 1970s was the development of the Ratel. Three years after Springfield-Bussing built the first prototype in 1974, Magnus Malan reported to Parliament that the Ratel was "successfully industrialised". Ratels replaced Buffels in support troops and by 1982 all armoured car regiments had been retrained to depend on mechanised infantry during conventional operations. A second watershed came when twelve junior officers and senior noncoms underwent training as tank commanders in the Israel Defense Forces, which had amassed considerable experience with mobile mechanised warfare. Officers who attended courses at the IDF combat school included the later commanders of 61 Mechanised, including Gert van Zyl and Ep van Lill. The acquired expertise in armour tactics was implemented in SAAC curricula and manuals, replacing the archaic British doctrine of World War II. Commands became more concise, emphasis shifted to reaction speed, and evaluation methods improved substantially. Nevertheless, the SAAC defeated the purpose of Israeli tank drills by applying them directly to armoured cars, setting a trend that continued throughout the border war.

Throughout the 1980s, Elands played a supporting role for the Ratel-mounted mechanised combat groups. Specific infantry battalions such as 61 Mechanised also held generic platoons of Eland-90s or Ratel-90s as an antitank reserve. The latter was preferred, as Elands experienced difficulty observing other forces in thick bush. Spotting tanks was a particular problem. Their crews had an even chance of noticing FAPLA T-54/55s, which also had low profiles. This poor visibility in vegetation also complicated command and control, frustrating both driver and troop leader to no end.

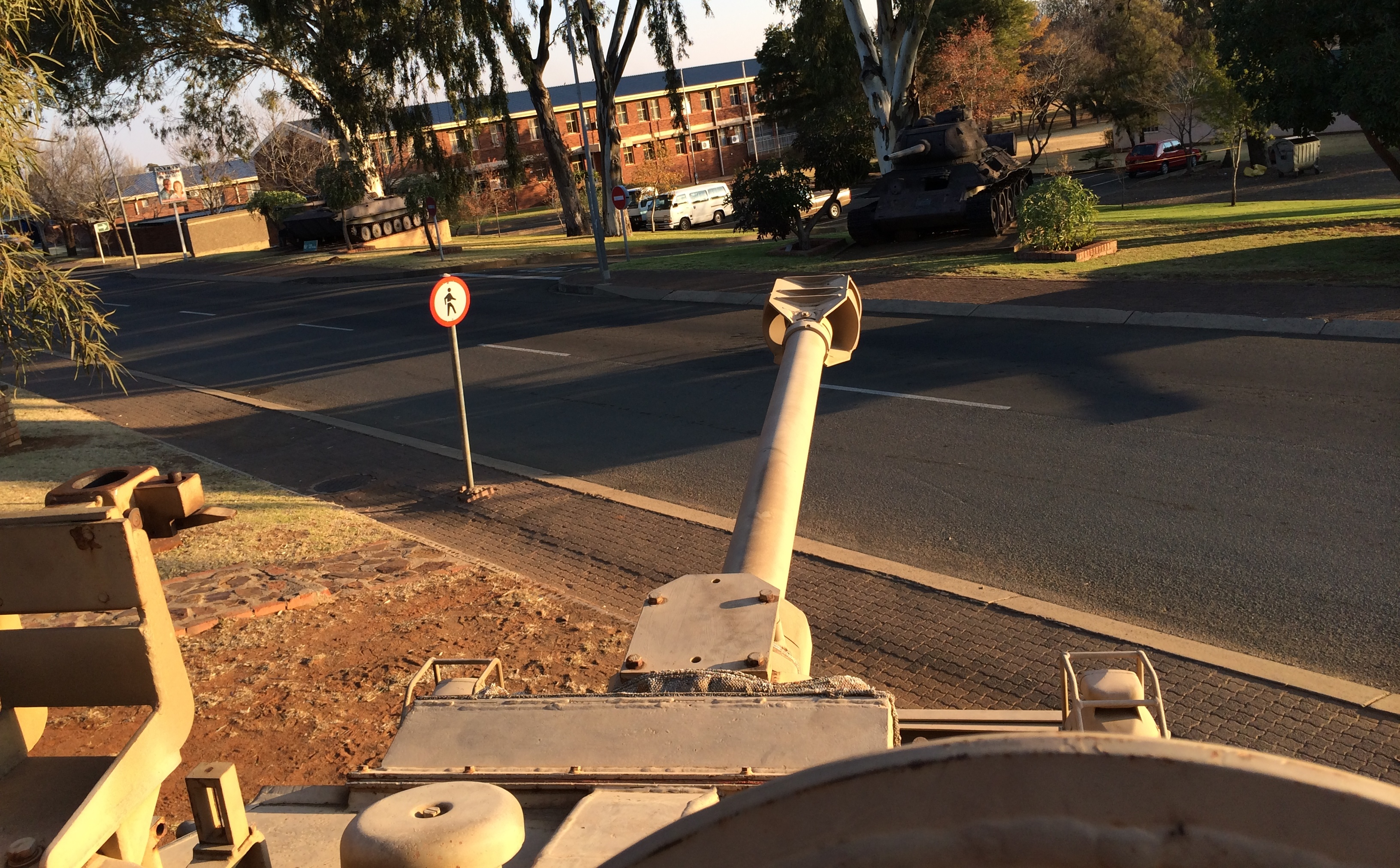
Gunner's view from the turret of an Eland-90. A FAPLA T-34-85 looms beyond the muzzle brake.

For decades, Elands were widely deployed in lieu of tanks in the SAAC. The main danger with this policy was that crews and commanders were often forced to use them against Angolan or Cuban tanks. Whenever T-55s appeared on the battlefield, they caused anxious moments for the Eland-90. The tanks carried stabilised cannon, so they could fire on the move, whereas the Eland-90 needed to come to a stop before discharging its main gun. Firing the 90mm GT-2 while in forward motion was theoretically possible but disrupted the recoil procedure and risked catastrophic damage to the vehicle's transmission. Their inferior armament and optics meant that Elands had to close in on a tank to eliminate it, which demanded considerable skill. Where possible gunners aimed for the rear, flank, or a vulnerable margin beneath the turret front. Naturally the tank would also turn to avoid exposing its thinner armour, so expert manoeuvring was required before they could get behind a T-55 and destroy it from there.

Eland-90 troops always identified one tank as a priority target. Then, when the chance came, the Elands fired simultaneously—knocking out the tank. To avoid being hit between volleys, they had to keep moving. This protocol was derived from SADF experience fighting T-34s and later applied to T-55s. Armoured car commanders believed it wouldn't have fared well against T-62s. Eland-90s struggled in big, dense, bushes while attempting to carry out their usual tactic during Operation Askari and were hereafter deemed unfit for high intensity campaigns.

== Survivors ==
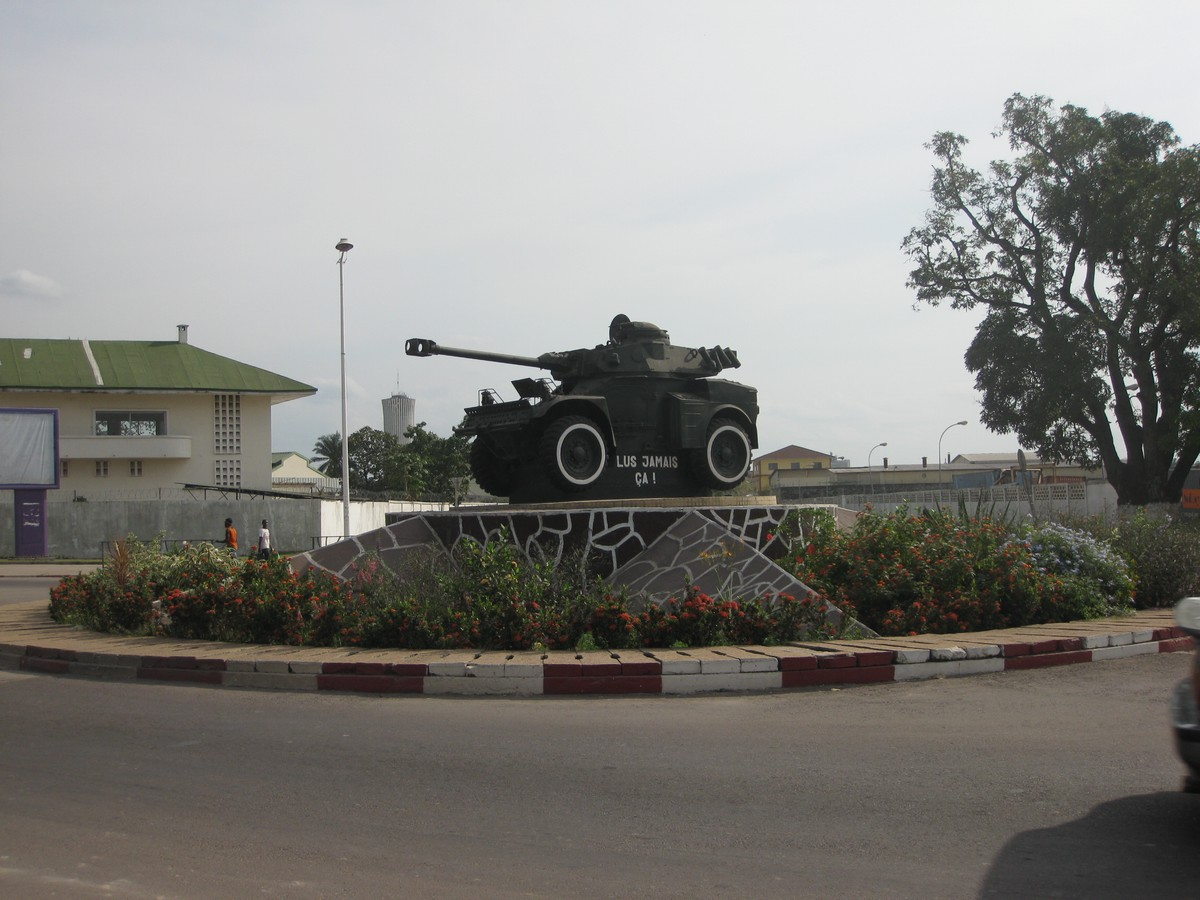
A plinthed Eland-90 on display in a public square in Brazzaville, Republic of the Congo.

South Africa formally retired its Eland fleet in 1994. However, at least one reserve armoured unit continued to operate Elands as late as 1996. Of the 1,268 still accounted for in 1991, only 235 remained in reserve storage by 1998. A statistic released by the Department of Defence in 1997 confirmed that Elands valued in excess of 41.3 million rand had been scrapped. In October 2005, all the SANDF's remaining Elands were offered for sale. Tenders for Eland-90s were still available in 2009.

In January 2005, two Elands at the South African National Museum of Military History were repossessed and impounded by the SANDF. The seizure of the vehicles was justified on the grounds that they had been marked off for disposal from the army's inventory some time prior, but SANDF officials had no record of their transfer to the museum. Why both Elands were being exhibited at the museum without the SANDF's apparent knowledge remains a mystery. The disputed Elands were eventually acquired by Denel, which had them overhauled at its own expense and returned to the museum in July 2015.

Both the South African Armour Museum in Bloemfontein and Sandstone Estates in Ficksburg have preserved at least one Eland-90 and Eland-60 apiece. Others survive on SANDF bases as gate guardians. Four armoured units are known to have retained individual Eland-90s for ceremonial purposes: 1 Special Service Battalion, the Umvoti Mounted Rifles, Regiment Mooirivier, and Regiment Oranjerivier. These vehicles participate in parades, public exhibitions, and fire gun salutes during special occasions, such as the anniversary of the South African Armoured Corps. Turretless Elands modified with ring-mounted handrails are still used for transporting SANDF dignitaries on parade grounds during official inspections.

An Eland-90 was sold at a private auction in Portola Valley, United States, on July 11–12, 2014. Another Eland-60 was sold to the Jordanian government by an unidentified supplier in the United Kingdom the following year, for exhibition at the Royal Tank Museum in Aqaba. Other foreign museums known to possess Elands in their collections include the Gweru Military Museum in Zimbabwe and the Sahrawi People's Liberation Army Museum in Algeria.

For several decades, an Eland-90 captured by FAPLA during Operation Savannah was publicly displayed in a square near the centre of Luanda. This vehicle has undergone at least one restoration and now resides at the Angolan Museum of the Armed Forces.

== Operators ==
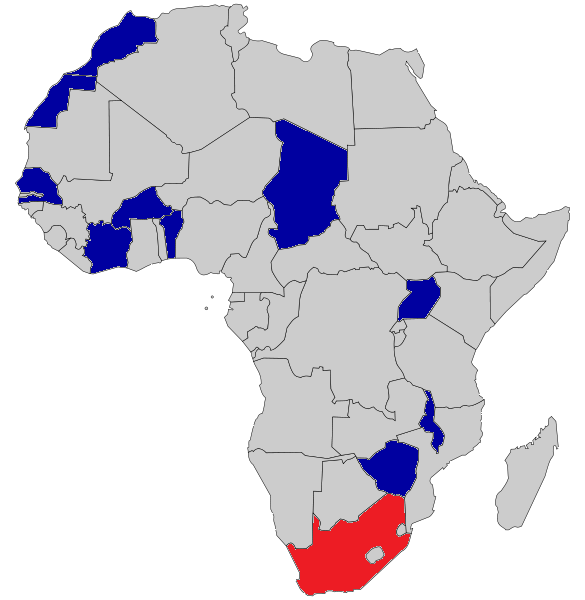
Operators Current Former

- Benin - Beninese Army: 3 Eland-90s, supplied from unidentified source in 2010. Beninese crews trained by 1er RHP, France.
- Burkina Faso - Burkinabe Army: 4 Eland-90s, supplied from unidentified source in 2006.
- Chad - Chadian Ground Forces: 82 refurbished Eland-90s purchased from a Belgian firm in 2007.
- Gabon - Gabonese Army: 4 Eland-90s and 4 Eland-60s in service with the presidential guard.
- Ivory Coast - Ivorian Gendarmerie
- Malawi - Malawian Army: 13 Eland-90s purchased from the SANDF in 1994.
- Morocco - Moroccan Army: 60 Eland-90s and Eland-20s delivered in 1981; provided with instructors for training the Moroccan crews.
- Sahrawi Arab Democratic Republic - Polisario Front: Presumably captured from Morocco.
- Senegal - Senegalese Army: 47 Eland-90s purchased from the SANDF in 2005.
- Uganda - Ugandan Land Forces: 40 Eland-90s purchased prior to the Second Congo War.
- Zimbabwe - Zimbabwe National Army: 16 to 28 Eland-90s inherited from the Rhodesian Army in 1980.

=== Former operators ===
- South Africa - South African Army: 1,268 Eland-60s and Eland-90s in active service in 1989.
- (South Africa) South West Africa - South West African Territorial Force: At least 40 Elands provided by the SADF; deployed exclusively with 91 Brigade.
- Rhodesia - Rhodesian Army and Rhodesian Air Force: Up to 60 Eland-90s and 12 Eland-60s donated by South Africa on semi-permanent loan.
- Portugal - Portuguese Army: at least 32 Eland-60 loaned by South Africa for use in Angola and Mozambique.

== In popular culture ==
Eland-90s painted with UNITA markings make an appearance in Call of Duty: Black Ops II, during a fictitious engagement of Operation Alpha Centauri. A number of the armoured cars are knocked out by FAPLA T-62 tanks outside Jamba in the protagonist's first mission, "Pyrrhic Victory".

Eland armoured cars feature prominently in the Larry Bond novel Vortex, which depicts a hypothetical SADF invasion of newly independent Namibia during the early 1990s. The Elands are pressed into front-line service to complement the Rooikat in the reconnaissance and fire support role, as the SADF was equipped with relatively few of the newer armoured cars during the novel's time frame.

A mercenary unit surreptitiously acquires several mothballed Eland-90s from the SANDF's reserve stores with the connivance of two corrupt South African armour officers in The Liberators, by Tom Kratman. The armoured cars are subsequently used to destroy several T-55 tanks in a coup d'état attempt.

== Gallery ==
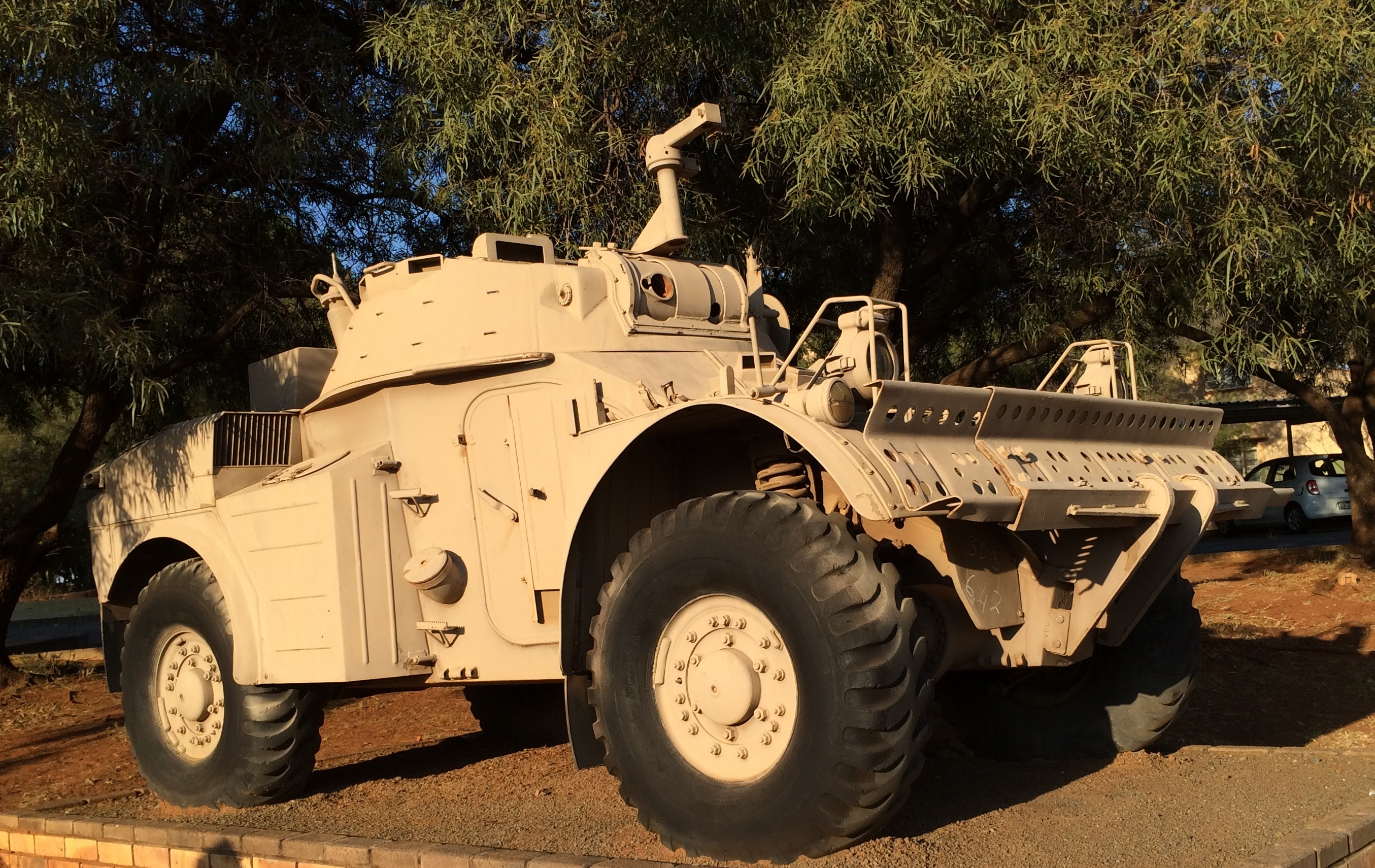
Eland-60, South African Armour Museum, Tempe Military Base, Bloemfontein

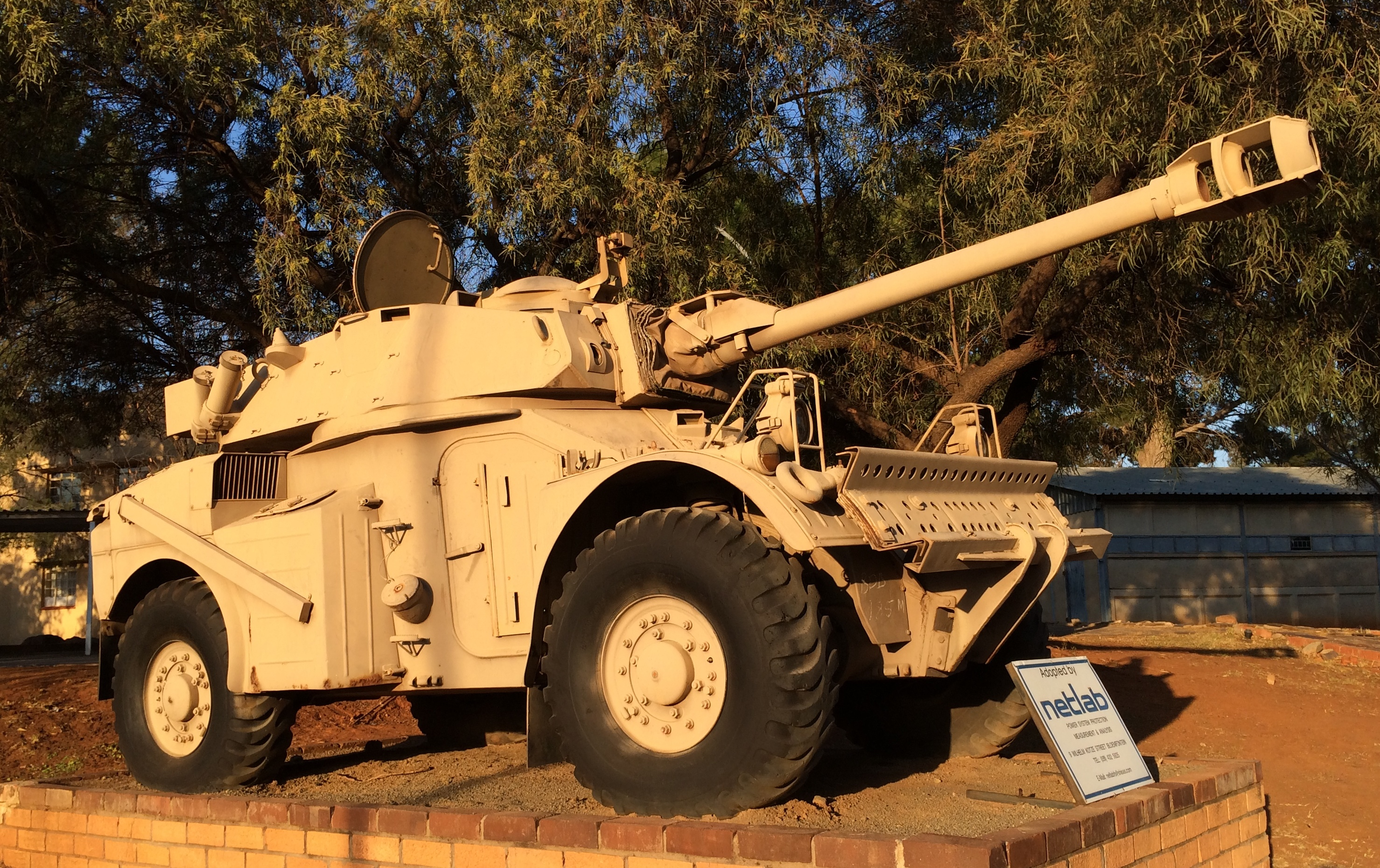
Eland-90, South African Armour Museum, Tempe Military Base, Bloemfontein

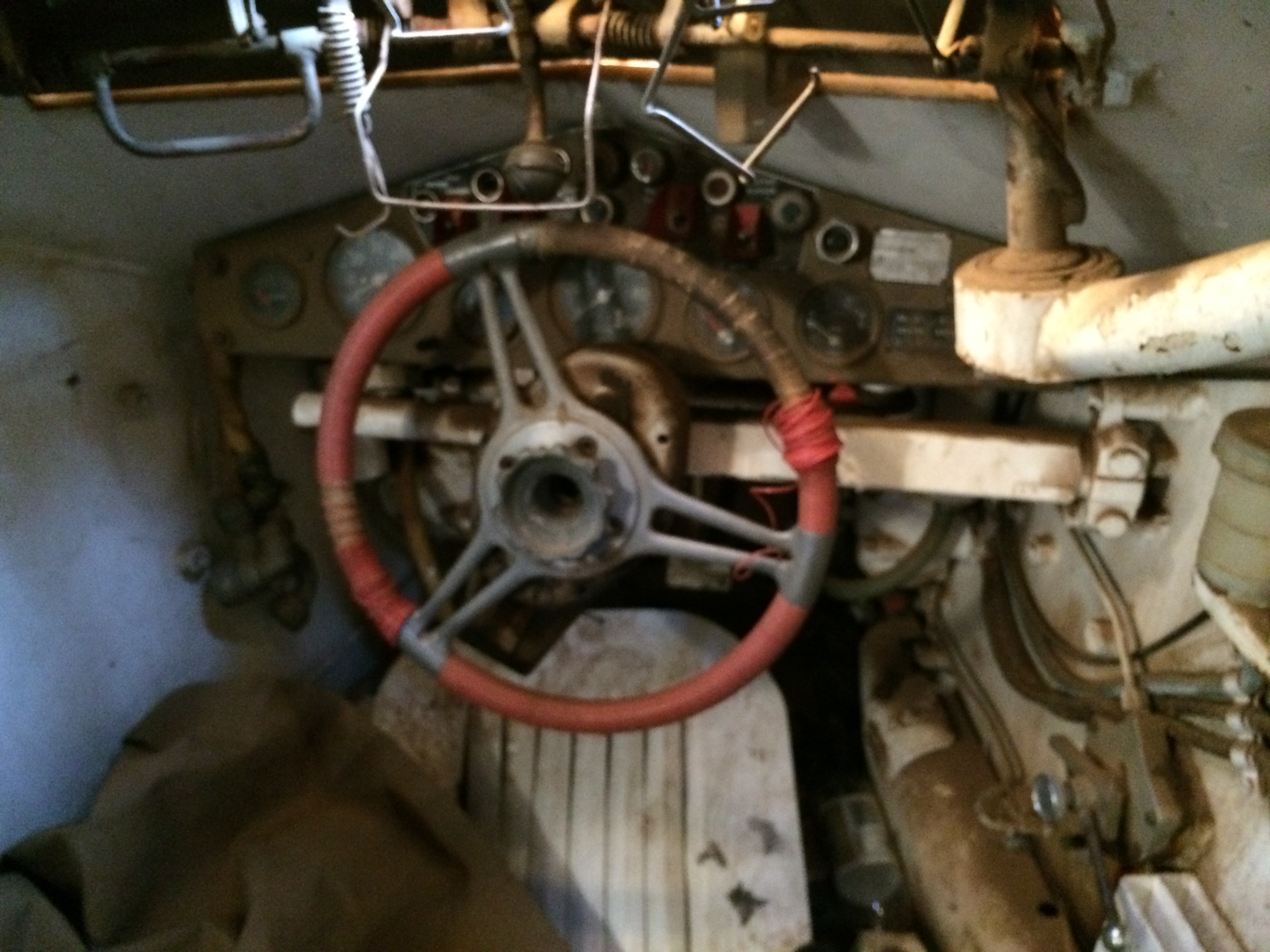
Driving compartment

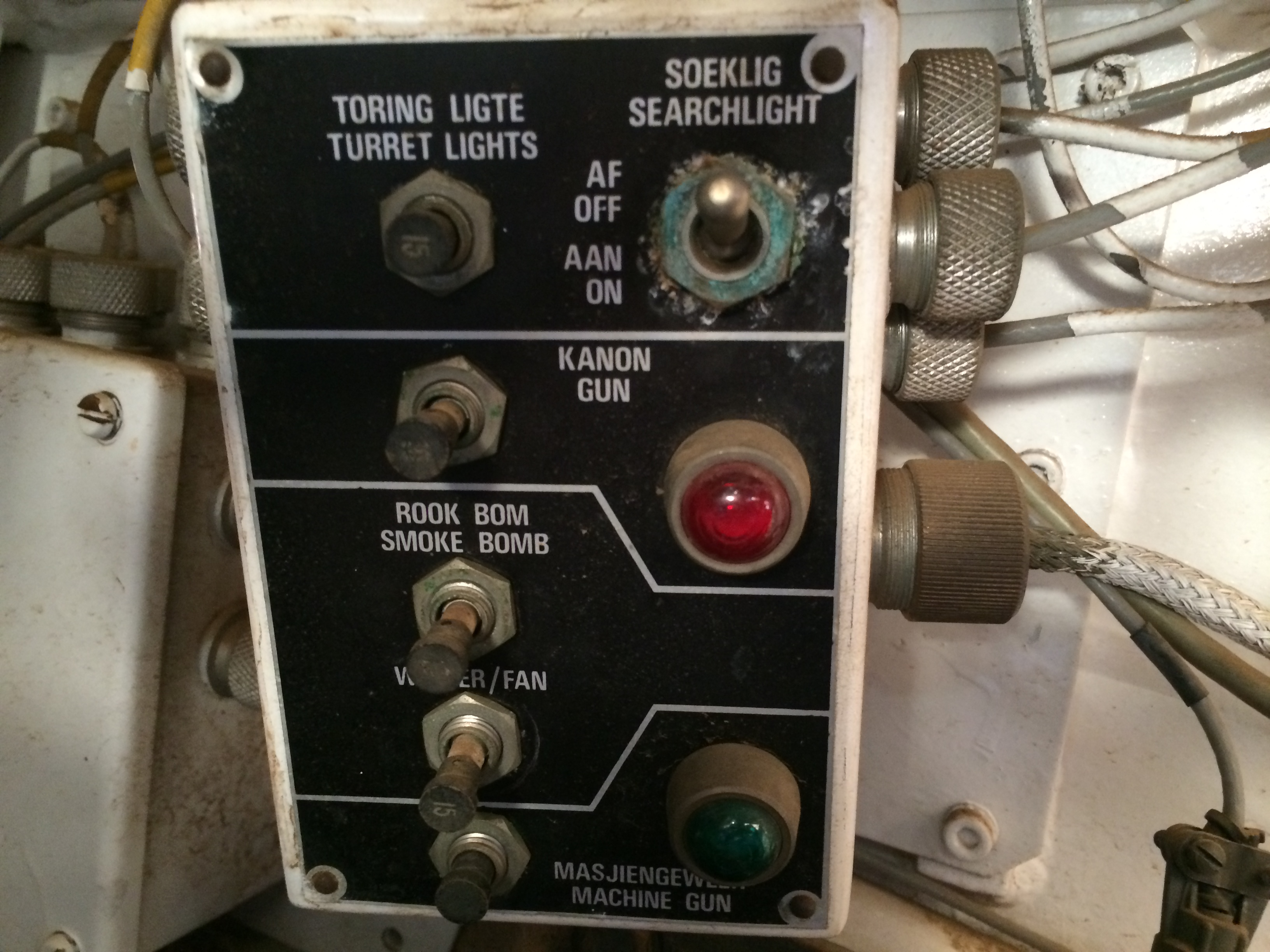
Gun selector switch box

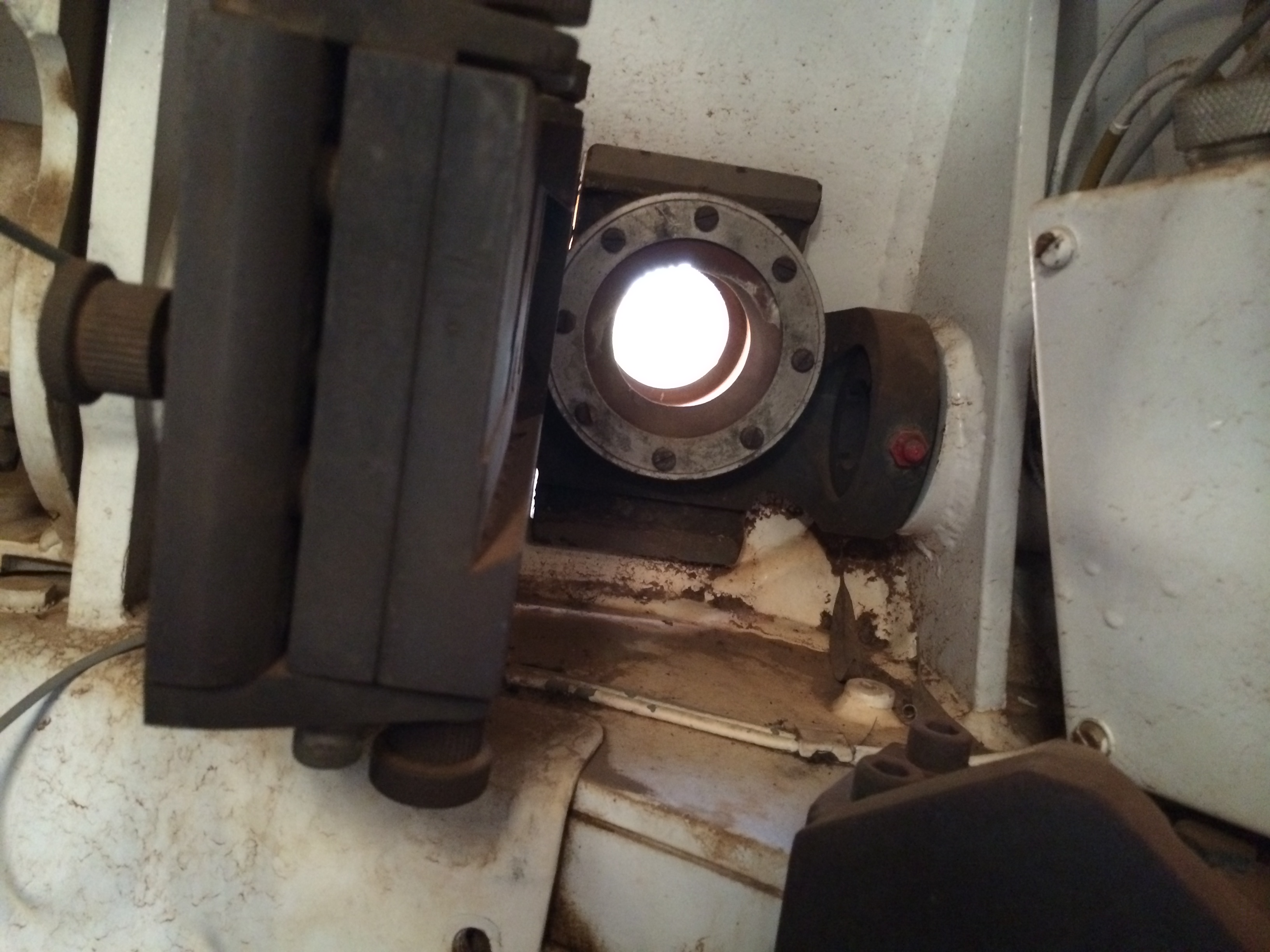
Gunner's sight (sight removed)

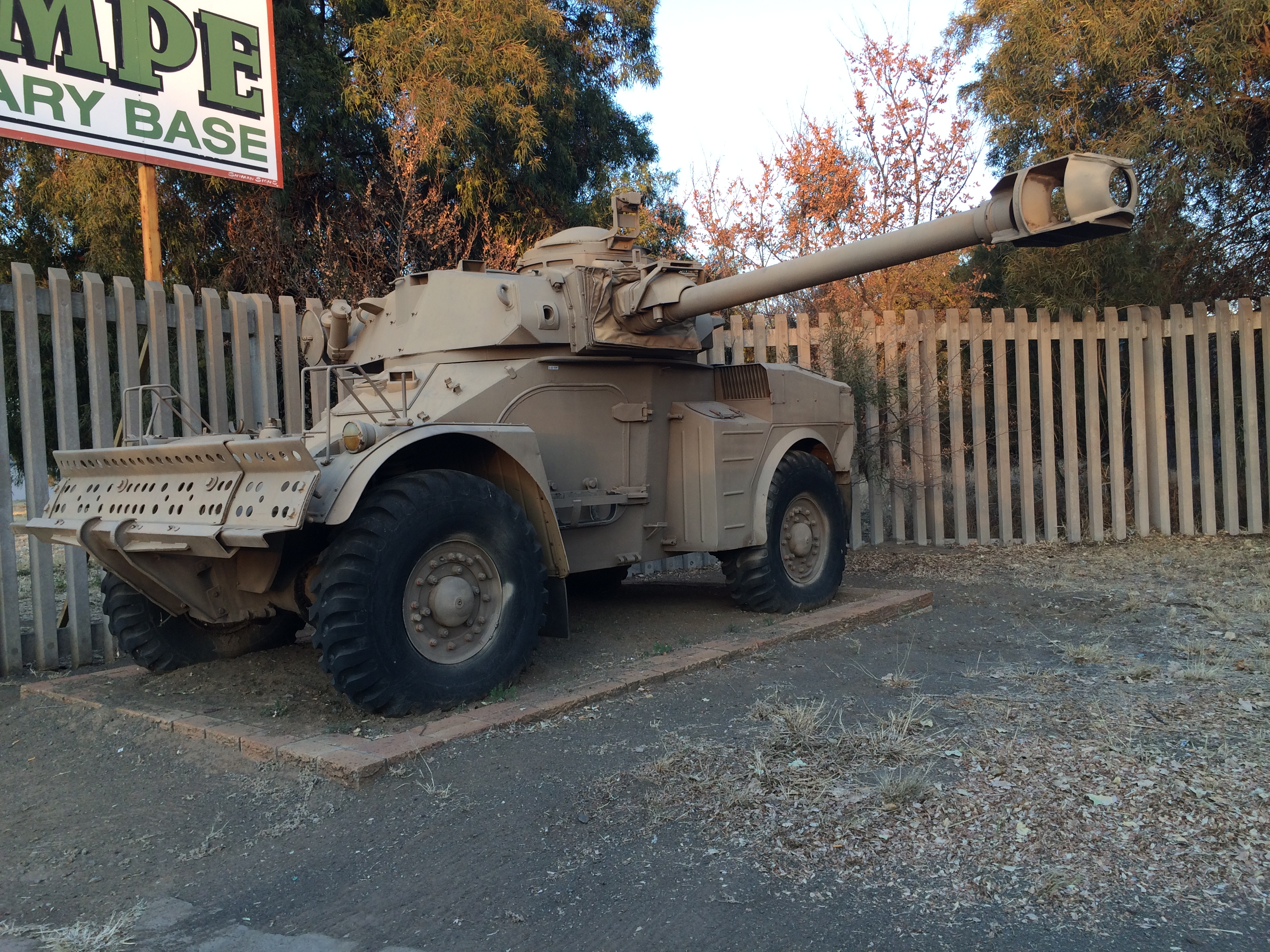
Eland-90 gate guardian, Tempe Military Base, Bloemfontein

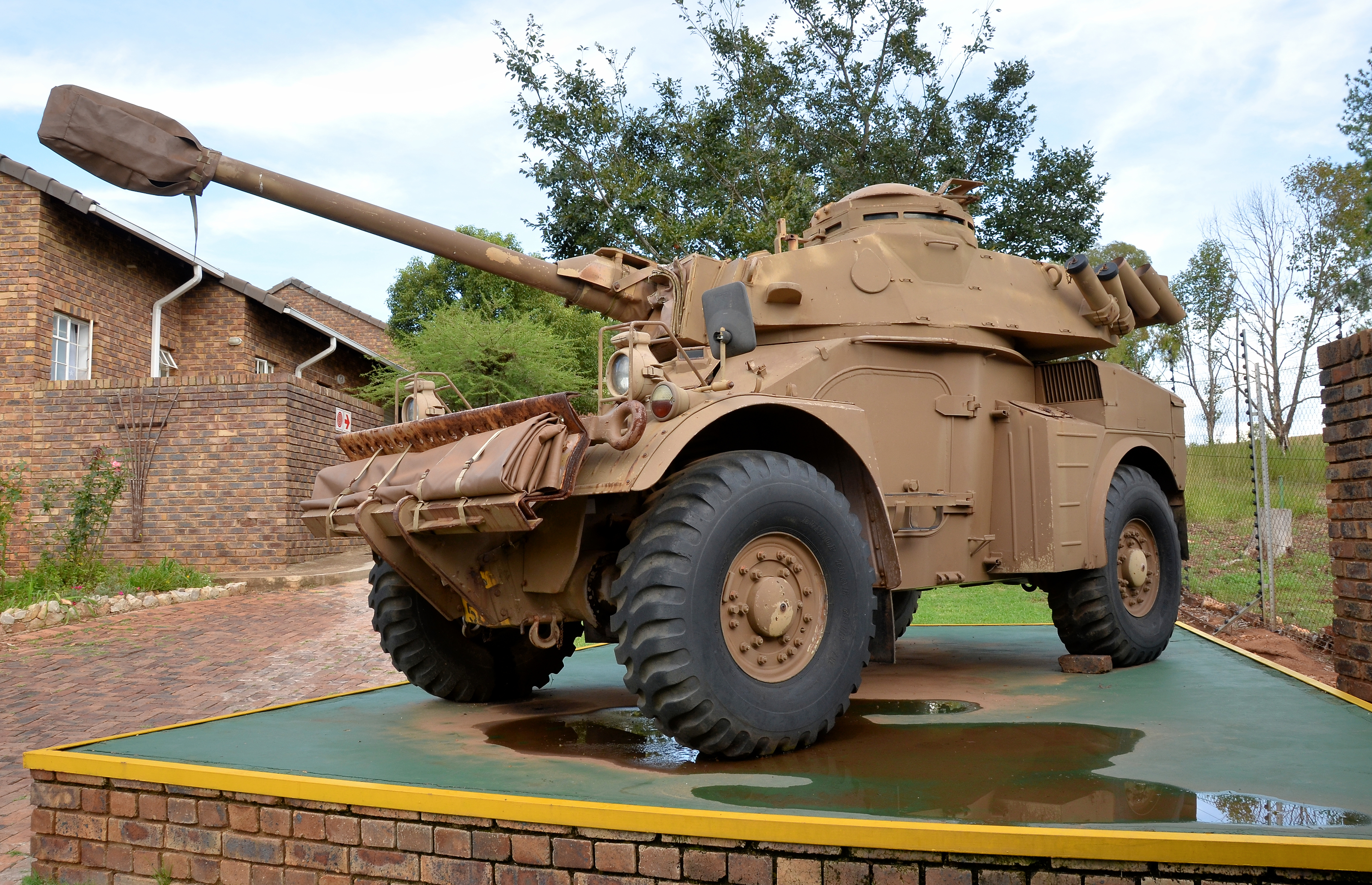
Plinthed Eland-90 in Irene

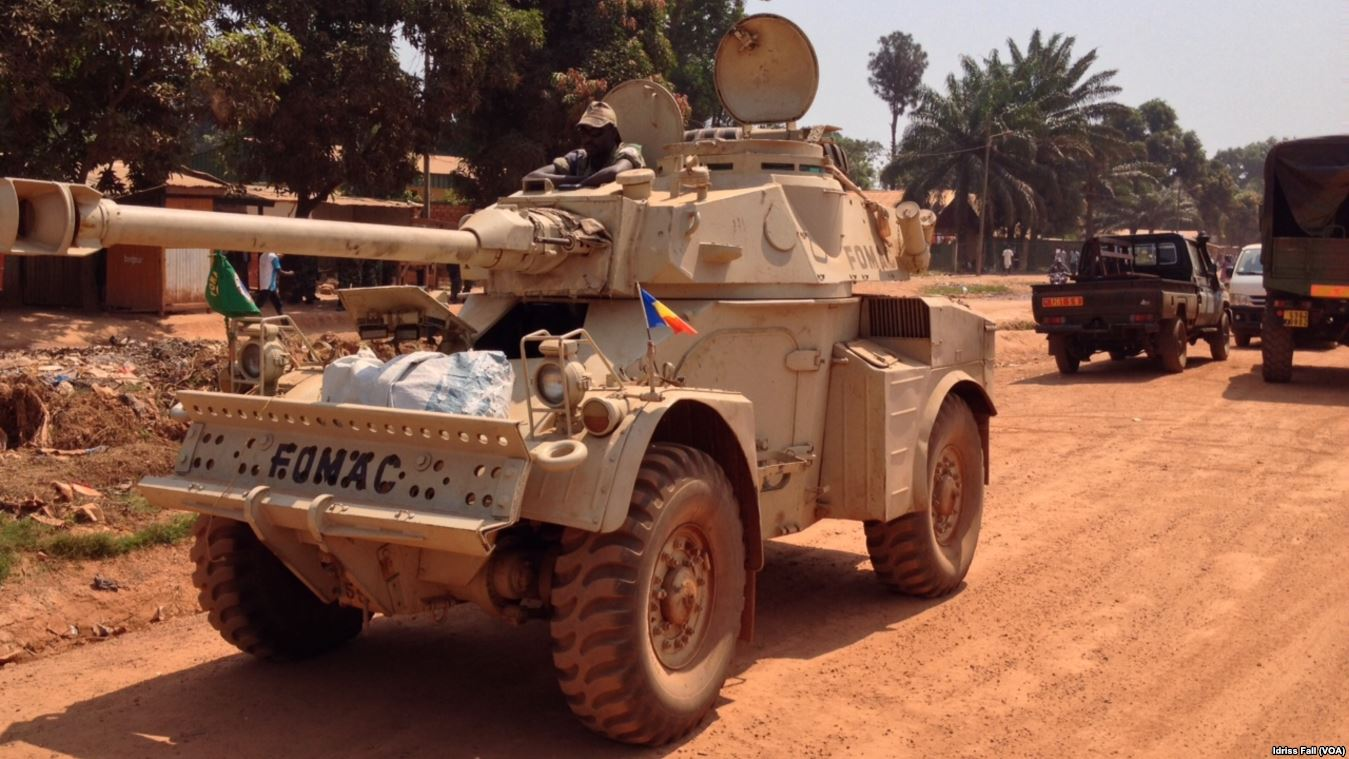
Chadian Eland on patrol in the Central African Republic
