= 6th South African Armoured Division =

South African Army combat formation

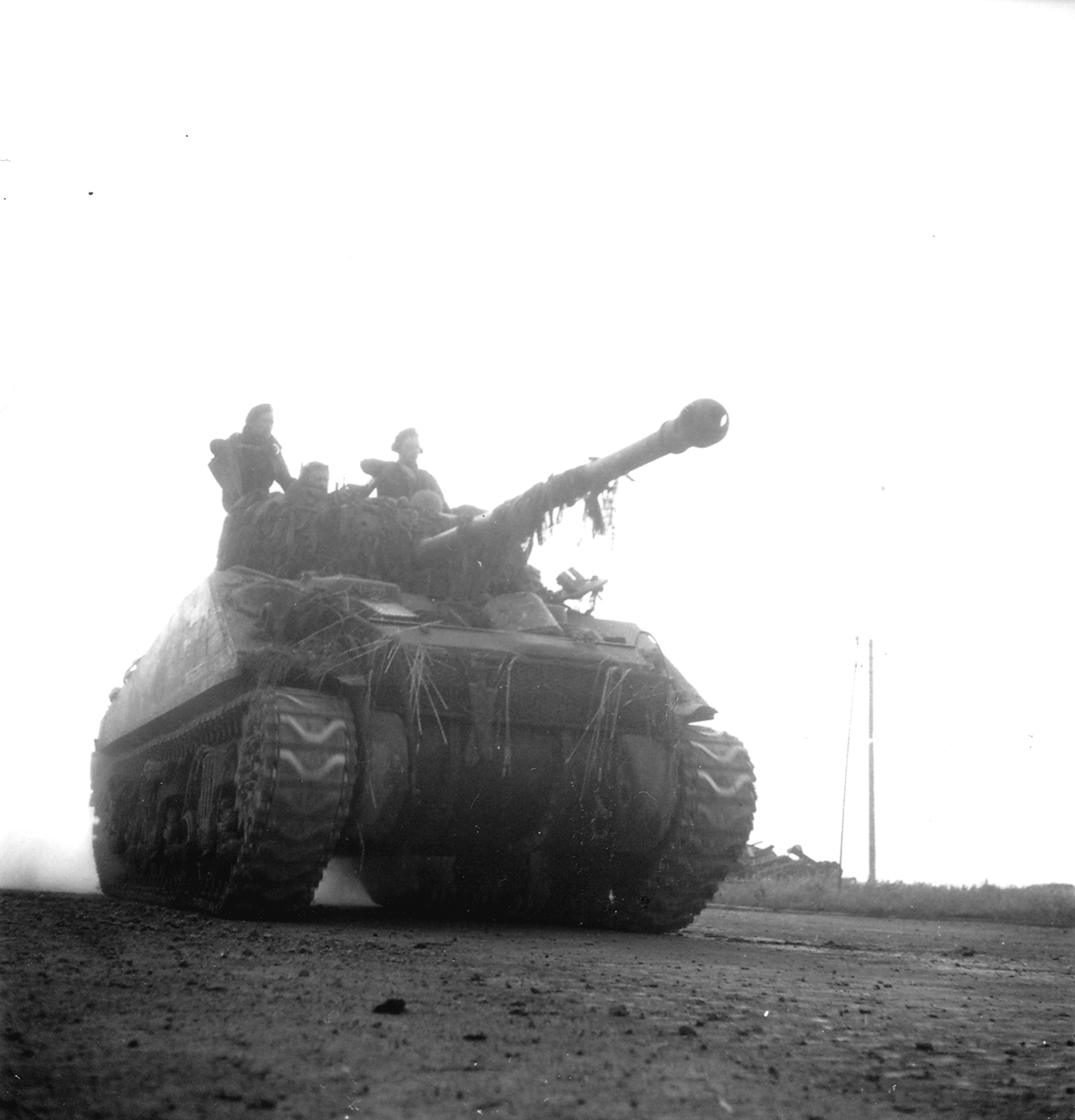
- Sherman Firefly as operated by the division in Italy.
- Active: 1 February 1943 – 2 May 1945; 1 July 1948 – 1 November 1949
- Disbanded: 1946
- Country: South Africa; Southern Rhodesia
- Allegiance: Allied forces of World War II
- Branch: South African Army
- Type: Armoured
- Size: Division
- Colors: Green and Yellow
- Engagements: Italian campaign

Commanders
- Commander: Feb 1943 to May 1945: Major General William John Evered Poole CB CBE DSO KStJ LOM (USA) (Note: CB, CBE, DSO, Commander of the US Legion of Merit, Commander of the French Légion d'honneur, Croix de Guerre avec Palme, Mentioned in Despatches)

Insignia
- Identification symbol

Major battles in red and Start (Taranto: 1944 – Black) and end (1945 – Green) campaign deployments

The 6th South African Armoured Division was the second armoured division of the South African Army and was formed during World War II. Established in early 1943, it was based on a nucleus of men from the former 1st South African Infantry Division who had returned to South Africa after the Second Battle of El Alamein in late 1942. The division was initially transferred to Egypt for training, after which it served in the Allied campaign in Italy during 1944 and 1945. In Italy, the division was initially deployed as part of the British Eighth Army, under command of Lieutenant-General Oliver Leese, and was then transferred to the U.S. Fifth Army, under Lieutenant General Mark W. Clark, for the remainder of the Italian Campaign. The division operated as a strongly reinforced division and was frequently used to spearhead the advance of the Corps and Army to which it was attached. They returned home after the end of the war in Italy and were disbanded in 1946. The division was also briefly active after the war from 1 July 1948 to 1 November 1949.

== Founding ==
The possibility of forming a South African armoured division was discussed as early as April 1941 between Major-General George Brink, Commander of the 1st South African Infantry Division and Prime Minister (Field Marshal) Smuts. At this time, South Africa was struggling to maintain the manpower levels needed to sustain two infantry divisions in the field. (Note: 1st Infantry Division and 2nd Infantry Division.) The 3rd Division was based in South Africa and was to provide the pool from which reinforcements were drawn to supplement the 1st and 2nd Divisions. All South Africans serving outside of South Africa were volunteers and far fewer men than expected volunteered their services and the view was held that if this trend continued, it would be necessary to convert one infantry division to an armoured division, as an armoured division would require fewer men. (Note: The South African ORBAT dictated an infantry division as requiring 24,108 men, whilst an armoured division required 14,195 men based on the British ORBAT.) Later, the vision was to establish two armoured divisions, as lower manpower levels became more pronounced.

After the Second Battle of El Alamein, the 1st Infantry Division was withdrawn to Quassasin with the understanding that its 1st Brigade would return to South Africa to regroup with the 7th Infantry Brigade (at this time the 7th Infantry Brigade was in Madagascar) to form the 1st South African Armoured Division. 1st Infantry Division's 2nd and 3rd Brigades would remain in Egypt to form the 6th South African Armoured Division which would replace the 2nd Infantry Division which had been captured at Tobruk in June 1942.

By January 1943, the Allied leaders had decided at the Casablanca Conference to pursue the war by invading Sicily, reducing the need for the number of armoured divisions as compared to those needed in the Western Desert. This, together with further manpower shortages led to the plans for a 1st South African Armoured Division being abandoned, with only the 6th Division being considered viable. All of the 1st South African Infantry Division brigades were returned to South Africa for re-training and amalgamation with other units to form the nucleus of the armoured division. The division was officially formed in South Africa on 1 February 1943 with Major-General W.H.E. Poole as commander and sailed for Port Tewfik in Suez on 30 April 1943 as a two brigade division, comprising 11th Armoured Brigade and 12th Motorised Brigade.

== Egypt ==
Training began in the desert at Khataba, north west of Cairo and was focused on tank operations and integrating the Rhodesian elements into the division. (Note: B Squadron of Prince Albert Guard (PAG) as well as C Squadron of Special Service Battalion (SSB) were Rhodesian armoured squadrons. The 17th Rhodesian Field Battery formed part of 1/6 Field Regiment and the Rhodesian 4th Anti-Tank Battery was re-designated as 1/22 Anti-Tank Battery within the division troops.) In addition, the lack of manpower had forced the merging of numerous units and much of the training time was spent on marrying up drills between the new composite units. The period of training was finally concluded by a series of training exercises, Exercise Cape Town being the first from 1 to 3 December for the 11th Armoured Brigade (11th Armd Bde) and Exercise Durban from 5 to 7 December for the 12th Motorised Brigade (12th Mot Bde). Training was concluded with Exercise Tussle (Note: The enemy troops consisted of British 10th Armoured Division, 11th Indian Infantry Brigade, 2nd Belgian Infantry Brigade and 1st and 4th Egyptian Infantry Brigades.) as a British III Corps operation finishing on 21 January 1944 and on 23 January the division moved to Helwan. By now, the division had been in Egypt for months due to indecision related to its role. (Note: The division was considered to be the most highly trained South African division to date. Of the 14,000 men in the division, 3,500 wore the Africa Star ribbon with the Eighth Army clasp, yet after one year from its planned deployment date, the division was still in the Middle East. There was a feeling that the Eighth Army did not require any additional armoured units and further, that the Army command preferred the South Africans to take over the Middle East policing duties performed by an Indian Division, allowing the Indian unit to be broken up to reinforce Indian units already serving in Italy (4th and 8th Indian divisions). This was preferred rather than introducing yet another national division into the Eighth Army, further complicating the Army organisation.)

On 3 March 1944, the division was instructed to move to Palestine and the advance parties left on 7 March. On 12 March however, this movement order was countermanded and the division was instructed to move to Italy. One year after arriving in the Middle East, the division embarked from Alexandria between 14 and 16 April to arrive in Taranto, Italy on 20 and 21 April 1944.

== Italy: Eighth Army ==
=== Detachment of 12th Motorised Brigade ===
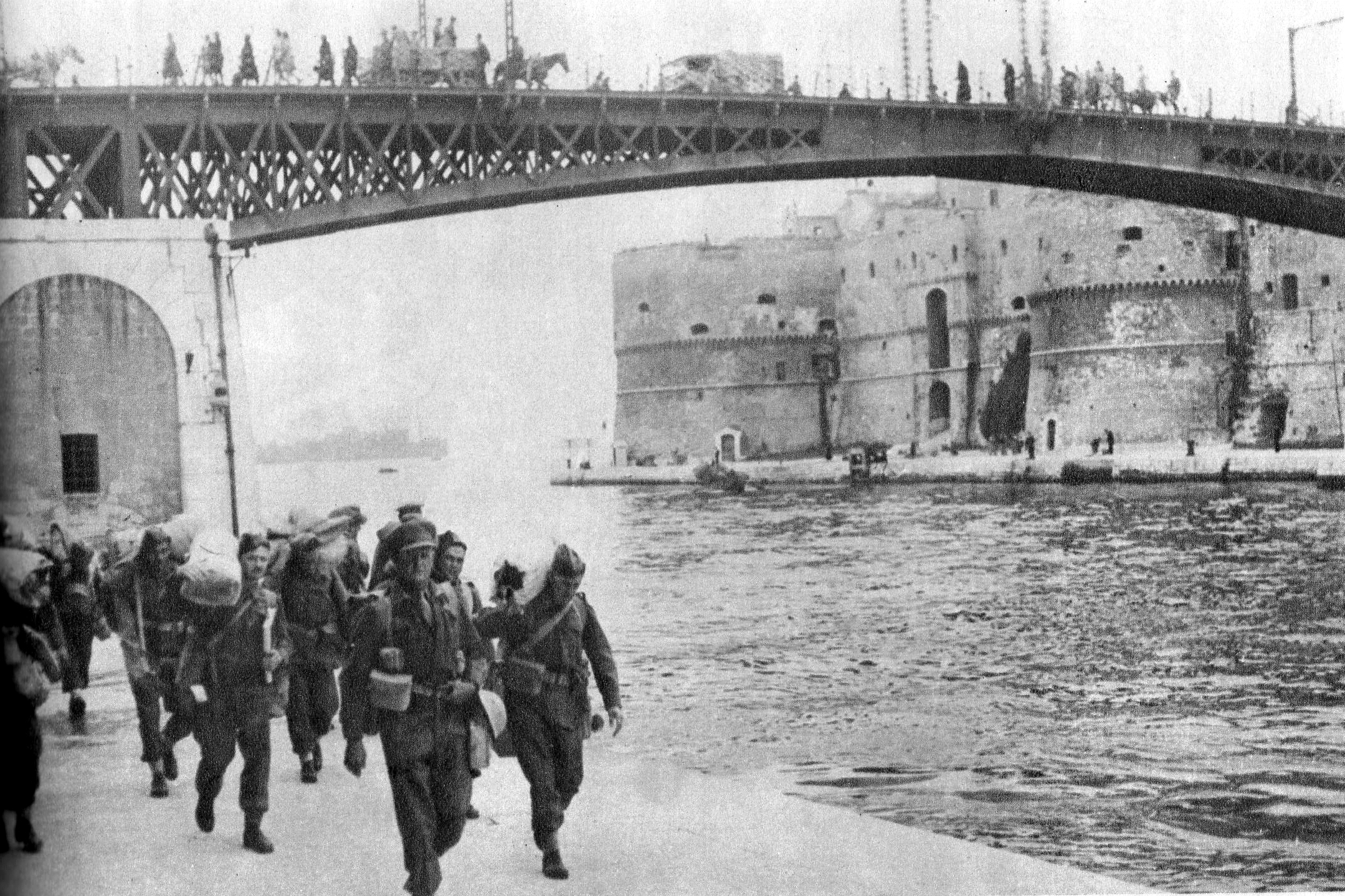
Troops of the 6th South African Armoured Division arriving in Taranto, Italy. April 1944

Regrouping was still in progress after arrival in Italy, when the 12th Motorised Brigade with artillery and support elements was ordered to move to the area of Isernia to prepare to relieve the 11th Canadian Infantry Brigade in the Cassino area and to come under command of the 2nd New Zealand Division in the British X Corps. These were the first division troops to enter combat in Italy. The South African Brigade held these positions until after the fall of Monte Cassino and the breakout from the Anzio beachhead, when they were withdrawn and reunited with the division.

=== Initial advance after the fall of Rome ===
Having formed part of British Eighth Army's reserve, the division was moved forward and attached to the Canadian I Corps after the Canadians and Polish II Corps had breached the Hitler Line north of Cassino. After Rome had been taken by the Allies in early June 1944, the division was ordered to move up the Via Casalina to take over the spearhead of the Eighth Army's British XIII Corps. To bring the division up to a full complement of three brigades, the British 24th Guards Brigade was placed under command, an association which lasted to the spring of 1945. The division advanced with the Tiber River to the east and Lake Bolsena to the west at a rate of 10 miles (16 km) per day, outstripping their flanking units. On 10 June the Armoured Brigade which was leading the advance, came up against the anti-tank screen of the newly arrived German 356th Infantry Division south of Celleno. For the first (and only) time Brigadier Furstenburg was able to deploy all three of his armoured regiments and his motorised infantry battalion in battle to gain an important victory. Lieutenant-Colonel Papa Brits (Special Service Battalion [SSB]) and Lieutenant-Colonel Bob Reeves-Moore (Imperial Light Horse / Kimberley Regiment [ILH/KR]) received DSOs for their leadership in the defeat of elements of the 356th Division. 11th Armd Bde's success permeated the whole division and on 12 June the division took Orvieto, having advanced 75 miles (121 km) in ten days. However, their daily rate of advance had been slowed considerably by consistently being in contact with the enemy.

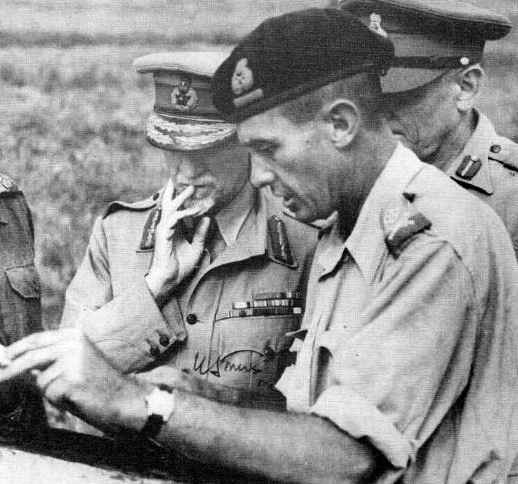
Field Marshal JC Smuts (Prime Minister), Major-General Poole (GOC) and Lieutenant-General Sir Pierre van Ryneveld (SA Chief of Staff), in Chiusi, Italy, 24 June 1944. The visit was to discuss the implications of the surrender of A Coy, First City/Cape Town Highlanders.

By 17 June, the Imperial Light Horse of the 11th Armd Bde had been stopped by the parachutists of the Hermann Göring Division on their first attempt to enter Chiusi but by 23 June, the town had been taken by the Cape Town Highlanders. During this attack on Chiusi, "A" Company of First City/Cape Town Highlanders was leading the attack up the terraces around the town. During the night of 21–22 June, the company was surrounded by strong German infantry elements closely supported by tanks and its surviving members were forced to surrender by noon on 22 June. Since the disaster of the surrender of the 2nd Infantry Division at Tobruk two years previously, the surrender of South African troops in the field had become a sensitive matter. This prompted Prime Minister Smuts, who had been meeting the British Chiefs of Staff on 21 June, to divert his aircraft to Orvieto airfield on his way back to South Africa to discuss the political and military consequences of this event with the division command.

=== Crossing the Albert Line ===
By 28 June, after stiff fighting, the Albert Line (referred to as the Trasimene Line by the Allies) had been broken and the Allies streamed north with the 24th Guards Brigade reaching Chianciano and the 11th Armd Bde pushing north of Lake Montepulciano. The Eighth Army's XIII Corps advance on Florence was led by the British 6th Armoured Division on the right, British 4th Infantry Division in the centre and the South African 6th Armoured Division on the left. The division advanced in two columns through Rapolano and Palazzuolo until they encountered the LXXVI Panzer Corps on the Georg Line, a delaying position on the north side of Route 73.

The strength of the Panzer Corps was not known initially and the leading elements of XIII Corps continued to probe forward expecting the German line to crumble under pressure without the need to launch a full-scale attack. The Corps fed in more battalions in an attempt to secure the Monte Lignano high ground and fighting for the hill continued on 6 and 7 July, but the 15th Panzer Grenadier Division continued to hold the heights. The South African Division had been stopped on the left flank with the two Infantry Brigades spread over a 10-mile (16 km) front, the armour having been withdrawn into reserve because of the difficult terrain. On 7 July, 2 New Zealand Division was brought forward from reserve and their attack together with the British 6th Armoured Division eventually took the high ground and caused the German Corps to withdraw towards the Heinrich Line behind the River Arno on 15 July. The South African Division could then continue their advance, directed on an axis towards Radda-Greve on the western side of the Chianti Mountains.

The division made good progress, advancing with two brigades leading the advance: the 12th Mot Bde astride the road defining the division's axis of advance and the Guards Bde on the right flank, on the slopes of the Chianti highlands. Radda was secured on the night of 17 July and orders were then received for the division to secure the heights of the Chianti Highlands. The Guards Bde took Mt. Maione by a night attack on the night of 18/19 July supported by the tanks of the Pretoria Regiment while 12th Mot Bde attacked to take Mt. St. Michele (Pt 892) on 20 July. The division now held the heights of the Chianti range, dominating the Arno Valley and the advances to Florence.

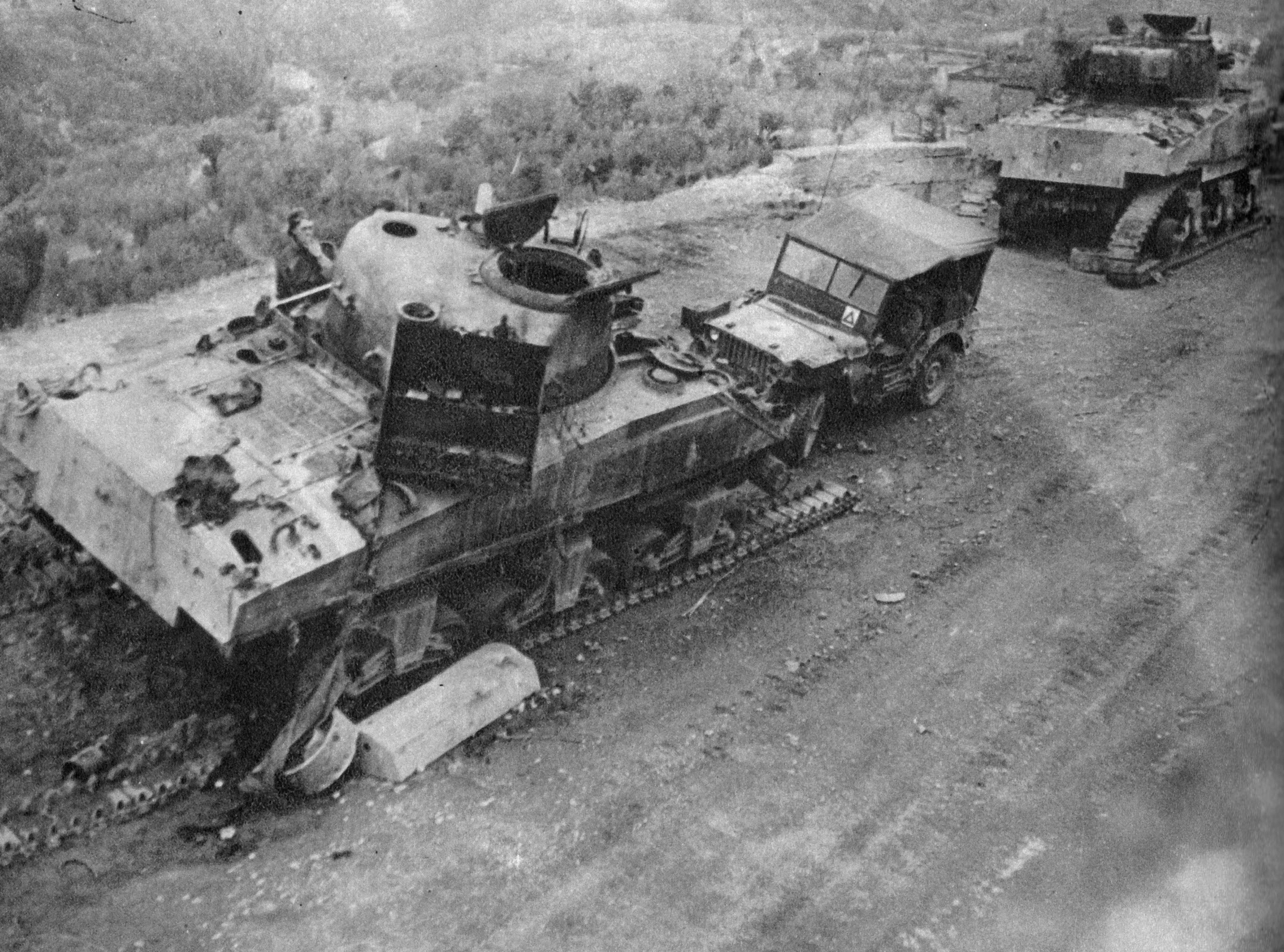
South African Sherman tanks disabled in the fight to take the Perugia Highlands. 1944

=== Florence ===
On 20 July General Kirkman, XIII Corps commander, issued orders for a "...powerful thrust to seize all crossings across the River Arno to the west of Florence." This effort was to be concentrated on the 6th South African Armoured Division front. The advance was to be led by the South African Division with the 4th Infantry Division to its right, supported on the flanks by the 6th British Armoured Division and the 8th Indian Infantry Division. The division's advance was slowed at the approaches to Greve due to heavy mining, where a number of tanks were lost but eventually the 11th Armd Bde succeeded in capturing Mercatale, which was defended by the German 356th Infantry Division supported by Tiger tanks. The division advanced through Greve and were again stopped by the German 4th Parachute Division on the River Greve on 24 July. The division had, however, outflanked the German Parachute Division, who then withdrew during the night of 24/25 July, allowing the South African, New Zealand and Indian Divisions to advance to the Paula Line which was reached on 28 July.

Kirkman again placed the South African and New Zealand Divisions as the spearhead of his Corps advance, this time to break the Paula Line and to take Florence. The New Zealand Division would carry out the main assault and the South African Division would neutralise the enemy on the high ground west of Impruneta and then clear Route 2 into Florence. The attack was scheduled for 30 July 1944. General Harold Alexander, commander of Allied Armies in Italy, had indicated that he had no intention of fighting in Florence and so Kirkman gave orders for the by-passing of the city. On 31 July the heavy artillery support for the attack had resulted in an ammunition shortage and Kirkman ordered a 24-hour pause for fresh supplies to arrive. The Desert Air Force flew over 100 sorties per day on 31 July and 1 August in support of the attack and by 3 August columns of South African, New Zealand and 4th Infantry Divisions were advancing towards Florence. By 4 August, advance parties were exploring the outskirts of Florence to find that all bridges across the Arno River viable for military transport had been destroyed. An Imperial Light Horse / Kimberley Regiment patrol however found the smaller Ponte Vecchio bridge intact and crossed it under heavy shelling, entering into the centre of the city at 4 am, to be the first allied troops to enter Florence. (Note: Although Florence had been declared an open city and had been evacuated by the Germans, they continued to shell troops advancing into the city.) (Note: This fact is contested by the Māori Battalion of the 2nd New Zealand Division whose regimental history claims that they were the first Allied troops to enter Florence.)

After reaching Florence, General Pool recorded in a Special Order of the Day, that the division had "... covered 601 miles (967 km) since leaving its concentration area at Taranto, its artillery had fired 201,500 rounds, the Divisional Engineers had built sixty five bridges (one a day!) and had made 196 major deviations necessitated by 'blows' and demolitions. The signallers had laid 3,752 miles (6,038 km) of telephone cable." The division was then withdrawn into Eighth Army reserve for rest and maintenance in the Siena / Castelnuovo area until 17 August, when orders were issued for the division to be transferred from British XIII Corps to U.S. IV Corps to partially replace divisions withdrawn to the U.S. Seventh Army for the assault of southern France. (Note: In addition to having lost troops withdrawn to support the Seventh Army landings, the U.S. Fifth Army then consisted of four infantry divisions (34th, 85th, 88th and 91st) and the U.S. 1st Armored Division. The addition of a Brazilian formation was discounted, as these troops were still undergoing training and the capabilities of the 92nd Negro Division which was on the way to Italy, was unknown. It was evident that in order to keep up with the British Eighth Army, the U.S. Fifth Army needed reinforcement. For this reason, the British XIII Corps was assigned from the Eighth to the Fifth Army and the South African Division was moved from XIII Corps to U.S. IV Corps (they in turn being replaced by the British 6th Armoured Division within XIII Corps) to add an additional armoured division to the Army. The 24th Guards Brigade remained with the South African Division in the transfer to the Fifth Army.) The 6th South African Armoured Division was assigned to their new Corps in the U.S. Fifth Army as from 22 August 1944 and was replaced in XIII Corps by the British 6th Armoured Division.

== Italy: Fifth Army ==
=== Crossing the Arno River ===
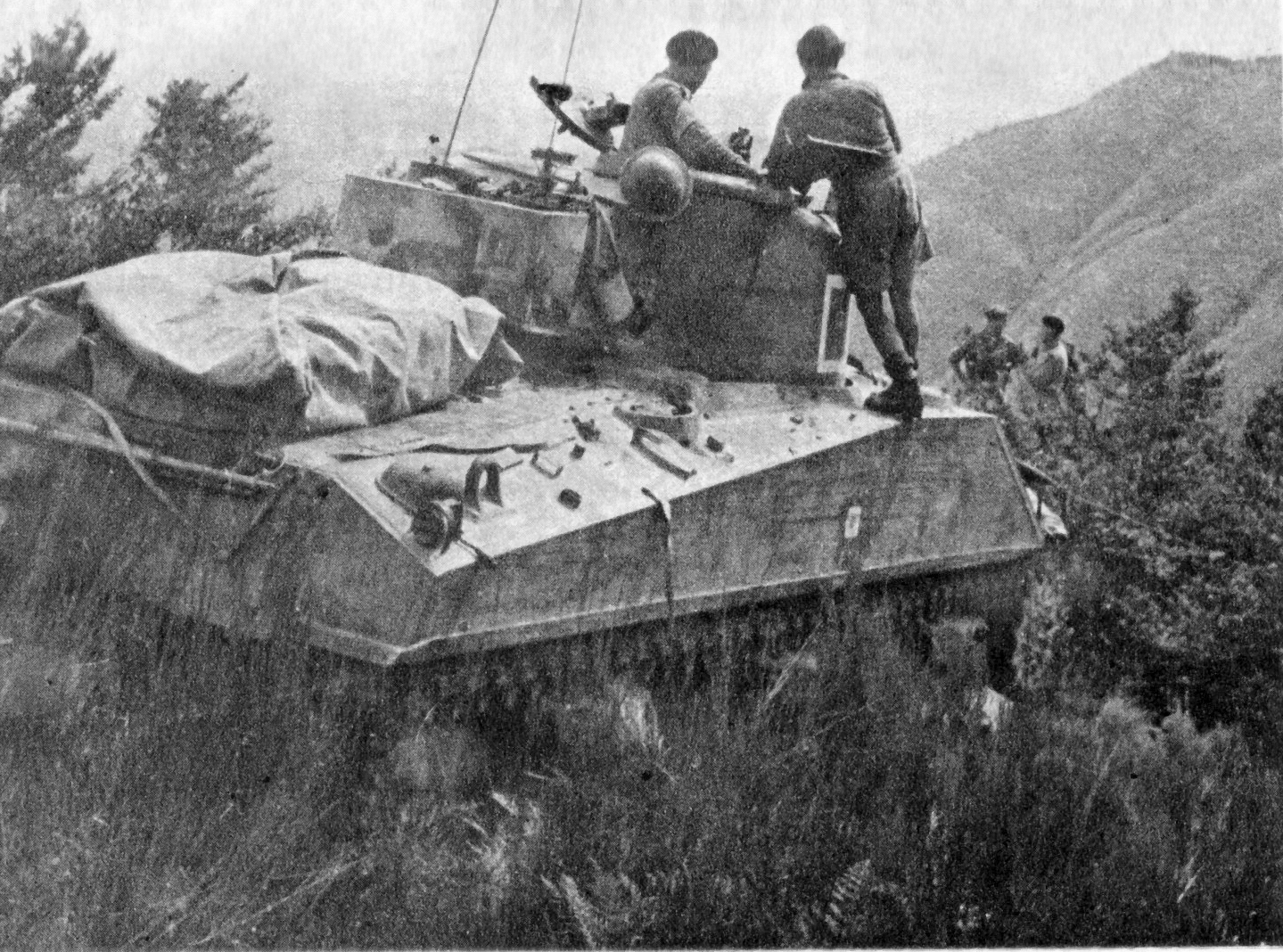
Pretoria Regiment Sherman on the summit of Monte Albano north west of Florence after crossing the Arno River

To continue the main Allied thrust north from Florence, the Arno River first had to be crossed. Reconnaissance patrols from the First City/Cape Town Highlanders [FC/CTH] found suitable crossing points close to Le Piagge allowing the 12th Mot Bde to cross during the night of 28/29 August under light enemy artillery fire. Reports from prisoners indicated that the German forces in front of the division were withdrawing, and this was confirmed by the sound of demolitions ahead of them. The 12th Brigade, as well as the Guards Brigade were tasked to send fighting patrols forward to determine the extent of the withdrawal. Reports indicated that the Germans had withdrawn across a wide front to what was to later become known as the Gothic Line. The division crossed the river thanks to Bailey bridges erected between the damaged abutments by the South African Engineers. Under sporadic shelling and some units encountering light resistance, the operation was completed by 3 September. General Pool, observing the lack of resistance ahead of the division, encouraged a rapid advance, but this was countermanded in order not to compromise the surprise of the main 5th Army attack north of Florence. The order to wait and hold the Albano Massif until further notice was deeply resented by the division command and was considered representative of the persistent inflexibility displayed by the Fifth Army leadership.

=== Apennines ===
The Eighth Army offensive on the German held Gothic Line was assigned the codename Olive and had commenced on 25 August 1944. Ultra intercepts had shown that the Allies had a significant numerical superiority in manpower, armour, air and artillery, although there were concerns regarding the relative inferiority of Allied tank armour and gun power as compared to German equipment. The U.S. Fifth Army attack was launched on 10 September against the mountain bastions south of Bologna and was led by U.S. II Corps. As part of the plan, the 6th SA Armoured Division was ordered to advance along Route 64 leading to Vergato and Bologna and to capture the twin peaks of Monte Sole and Caprara di Marzabotto. The division's 24th Guards Brigade were first to encounter the Gothic Line defences when the Brigade met strong resistance from two battalions of the Lehr Brigade as well as two battalions of the 362nd Infantry Division, fighting from strongly fortified positions which had been prepared throughout the previous winter.

After being ordered to hold the Albano Massif, the 11th Armd Bde was forced due to the terrain to operate dismounted from their tanks in order to contain the German 362nd Infantry Division. By 22 September, demolitions were again heard and it became evident that the Germans had started withdrawing to Green Line II, the next layer of the Gothic Line defences. Operation Olive officially ended on 21 September 1944.

=== Gothic Line battles ===
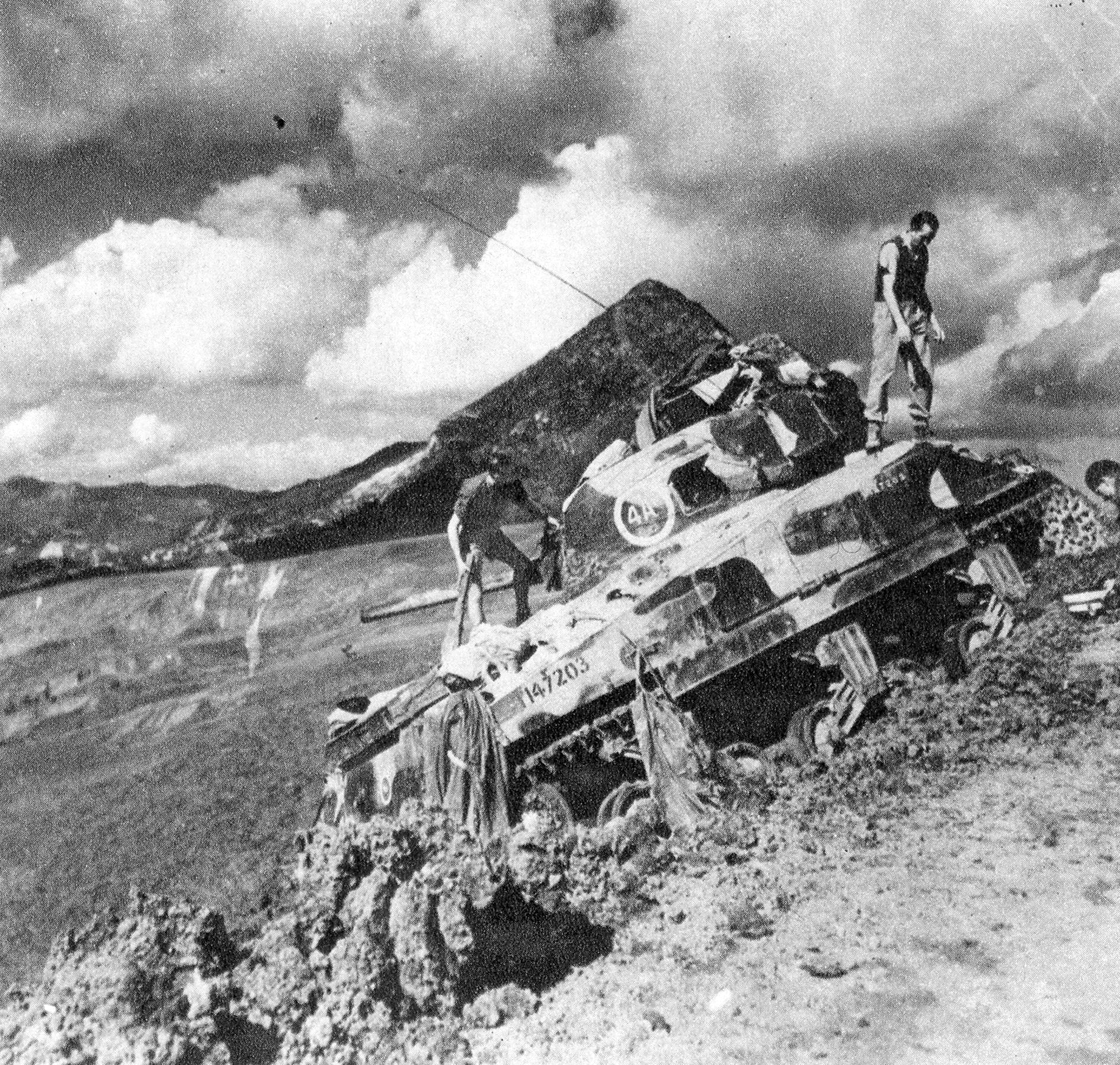
Rhodesian elements of 11th Armoured Brigade on Monte Vigese. September 1944

The South African advance re-commenced with the division heading north on Route 64 with US II Corps to their right and U.S. 34th Infantry Division on the left. Reports had been received that the 16th SS Panzer Grenadier Division had taken over from the German 362nd Infantry Division and that they were now defending the front ahead of the South African Division. By 28 September, the division was advancing on three widely separated axis, retreating German forces were demolishing bridges, culverts and roads and this, with traffic congestion on limited roads made passage extremely slow. It was then decided to hand over Route 66 to Task Force 92, as the South African Engineers were not able to maintain the three parallel routes simultaneously. This permitted the Guards Brigade to re-unite with the 11th Armd Bde in protecting the US II Corps western flank. Monte Vigese dominated the division's main line of advance. Two days of extended fighting in drenching rain against elements of the 36th SS Panzer Grenadier Regiment brought no break through and Poole then decided to pause and prepare a divisional attack on the mountain, to be led by 12th Mot Bde with 11th Armd and Guards Brigades in support. After an extremely heavy artillery bombardment of more than 10,000 shells, the attack succeeded.

After this battle, the division was withdrawn for rest and maintenance. It was reassigned from U.S. IV Corps to direct command by the U.S. Fifth Army to enable the Army commander, Lieutenant General Mark W. Clark, to coordinate the division's advance more closely with that of U.S. II Corps. In addition, the division was heavily reinforced with artillery and taking Combat Command B, an armoured brigade from U.S. 1st Armored Division, under command. (Note: As part of this change, the division was further reinforced by the addition of a medium artillery regiment from 10th Army Group Royal Artillery, as well as the attachment of three American heavy guns and the Combat Command B, an armoured brigade from U.S. 1st Armored Division.) The division's major task became that of thrusting north towards Bologna covering the flank of the U.S. 34th Division. Combat Command B was to advance on Route 64, the 24th Guards Brigade along the Setta Valley road, with 11th and 12th Bdes covering the high ground between the two. Opposing the advance was the 16th SS Panzer Grenadier Division. By 25 October the division had waded the Setta Creek and taken Hill 501 below Mt. Sole, but the Guards Bde attack on Mt. Sole was halted by torrential rains. The following day the continuing rains had turned to floods, isolating the division elements on Hill 501 and suspending all air support from U.S. XXII Tactical Air Command. Mt. Sole was not attacked again and the division was returned to U.S. IV Corps command on 4 November. As winter set in, the U.S. Fifth Army entered a period of static winter campaigning patrolling from fixed defensive positions until February 1945.

=== Spring Offensive ===
On 18 February the 24th Guards Brigade was transferred from the division to the British 56th Infantry Division in the British Eighth Army. This ended an enduring relationship, particularly between the armoured Pretoria Regiment and the three Guards battalions. The division was relieved by the U.S. 1st Armored Division's Combat command 'A' (which took over from 12 Mot Bde) and U.S. Combat Command 'B' (relieving the 11th Armd Bde) and was withdrawn to Lucca.

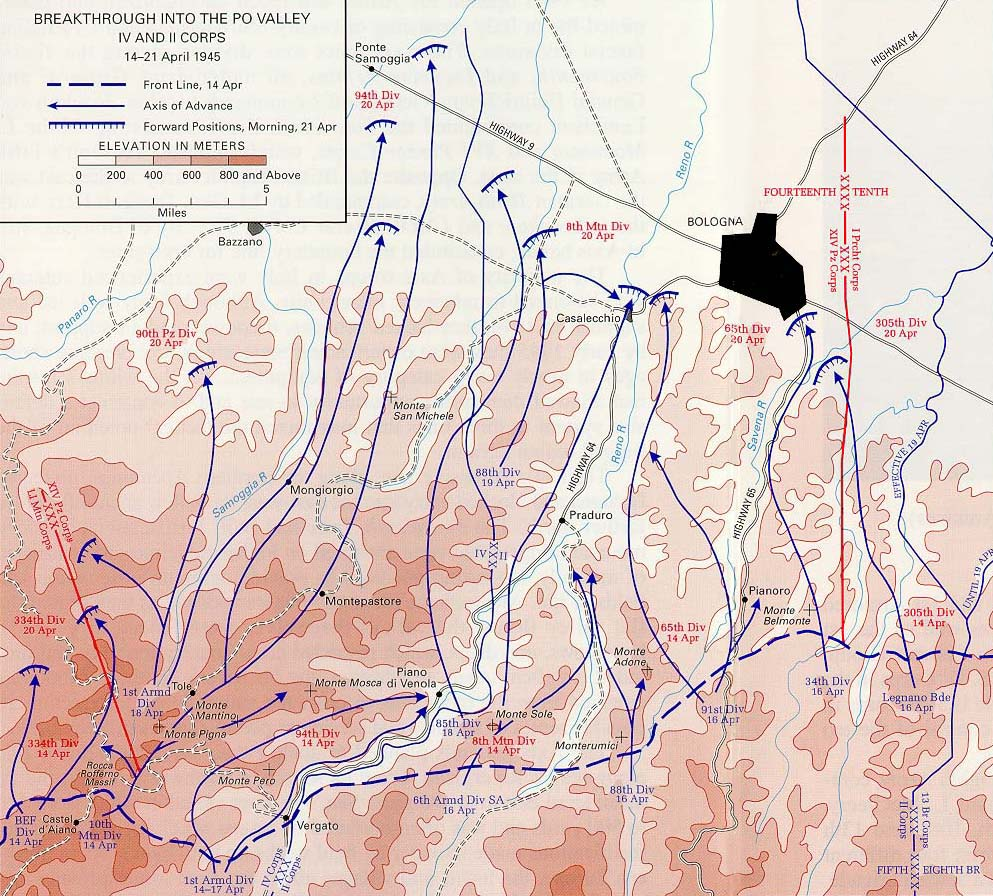
IV Corps movements into the Po River valley: April 1945

The final Italian offensive (codenamed Grapeshot) plan was based on the use of three phase lines, "Green," "Brown" and "Black". The U.S. Fifth Army, now under Lucian K. Truscott, operating on the left and coordinated with the British Eighth Army, now commanded by Richard L. McCreery, on the right, were to initiate the "Green" phase with primary attacks by the U.S. 1st Armored and U.S. 10th Mountain Divisions. In the "Brown" phase, the South African Division would assault the two peaks of Monte Sole and Monte Caprara in the centre of the U.S. II Corps (and thus Fifth Army) advance. If all progressed well, "Black" phase would signal the start of the break-out attempt by the armoured divisions into the Po Valley. The U.S. 1st Armored Division was to wheel westwards and the South African Division was to drive north west of Bologna to link-up with the Eighth Army. Intelligence had shown that the peaks the South Africans were to attack were defended by the German 8th Mountain Division.

Operations related to Phase Line "Green" progressed largely to plan and Phase "Brown" was initiated on 15 April. That night the South African Division was the first of the U.S. II Corps divisions to secure their objectives, taking Mount Sole in a series of well coordinated night attacks, assisted by the heaviest tactical bombing support they had received to date in the campaign. This was also the first combat experienced by the new 13th South African Motorised Brigade (13th Mot Bde) which had been sent from South Africa to replace the 24th Guards Brigade. The battle had been fierce for all the division's troops involved and in the succeeding successful exploitation of Monte Caprara heavy losses were incurred. On 21 April, 11th Armd Brigade, who were supporting the U.S. 349th Infantry Regiment, converged on the centre of the town of San Matteo della Decima. Soon furious house-to-house fighting erupted which continued until nightfall and resulted in several tanks being destroyed by fire from German Panzerfaust rockets. Poole committed all available South African troops to flush out German snipers and anti-tank positions and by 22 April all resistance had ceased.

These victories had created the opportunity for the armour to break through to Bologna as part of Phase "Black" and the South Africans linked up with the British 6th Armoured Division on 23 April and in the process cut the lines of retreat of the German 14th Panzer and 1st Parachute Corps between them. In addition, in their advance to the link-up, the South African Division had destroyed the German 65th Infantry Division. After advancing through the Po River Valley, the division was assembled southwest of Treviso on 29 April and were instructed to move far to the west to garrison the city of Milan.

General Mark Clark, the 15th Army Group commander, commented on the division's achievements during the Spring Offensive, stating:

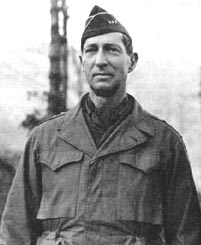

It was a battle-wise outfit, bold and aggressive against the enemy, and willing to do whatever job was necessary. In fact, after a period of severe day and night fighting, the 6th had in an emergency gone into the line as infantrymen. When the snow stalled their armour they dug in their tanks and used them as artillery to make up for our shortage in heavy guns. Whenever I saw them, I was impressed by the large number of decorations and honours they had earned the hard way. Their attacks against strongly organised German positions were made with great élan and without regard for casualties. Despite their comparatively small numbers, they never complained about losses. Neither did Smuts, who made it clear that the Union of South Africa intended to do its part in the War – and it most certainly did.
General Mark W. Clark, Calculated Risk. p. 391

== End of the war ==
=== Axis surrender ===
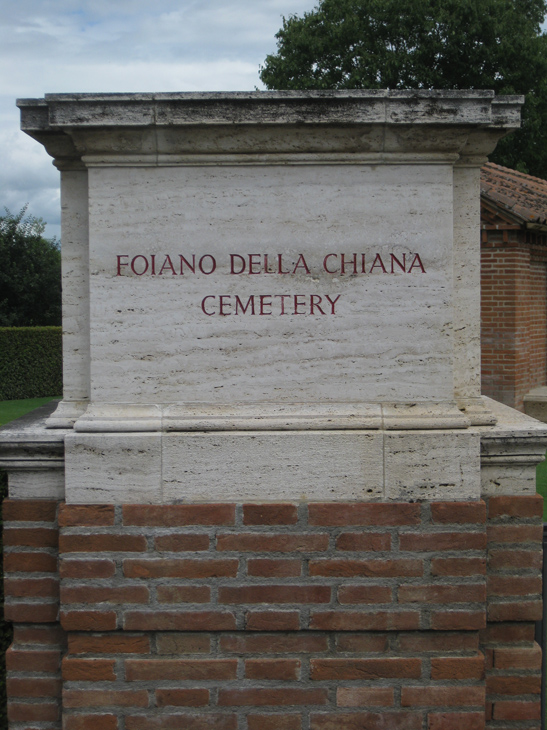
Entrance to Foiano Della Chiana Cemetery where 66 South Africans are buried, killed in the Chiana battles of June/July 1944.

Early on 2 May the German Theatre commander, Field Marshal Albert Kesselring, agreed to Field Marshal Alexander's surrender terms and broadcast orders to cease fire. The South African Division was north east of Milan by 3 May, when General Fridolin von Senger und Etterlin delivered the surrender of the German forces in Italy to General Clark in Florence. This was followed by Winston Churchill's announcement of the end of the war in Europe on 8 May 1945. The division held a major victory parade at the Monza motor racing circuit on 14 July 1945 attended by Generals Clark (15th Army Group) and Truscott (5th Army) as well as commanders of numerous formations in the region. During this parade, numerous US awards were made to men within the division, including the rank of Commander of the Legion of Merit being awarded to General Poole.

South African brigades were then deployed to the Swiss and French borders for frontier duties with 11 SA Armd Bde along the Swiss border, 13 Mot Bde around Turin, and 12 Mot Bde in the Aosta Valley contiguous to the Franco-Italian border which was drawn on the high ground separating the two countries. On 16 July, the Italian Cremona and Mantova Battle Groups were placed under command of the division to assist in these duties, allowing some of the battalions to be withdrawn for repatriation to South Africa. The two motorised brigades were amalgamated and remained responsible for guarding duties in the province of Imperia until 18 August while the armoured brigade was amalgamated with the division artillery.

=== Riots during demobilisation ===
By the beginning of April 1945, it had become obvious that the war was coming to a close and that the division as well as many other South African troops serving as divisional, corps or army troops with other formations would require repatriation back to South Africa for demobilisation. On 1 May, the Union Defence Force realised that no plans had yet been made to get all men back and instructions were prepared to move 5,000 troops per month by air commencing 1 July 1945 and 15,000 men by sea during the second half of the year, resulting in the repatriation of 45,000 troops by the end of the year. In addition to the 6th South African Armoured Division and other troops in Italy, there were thousands of recently released South African prisoners of war who had been held in Italy from the 2nd South African Infantry Division since the Sidi Rezegh and Tobruk battles in the western desert. Their numbers had not been factored into the demobilisation plans.

The staging depot at Helwan north of Cairo was soon overcrowded and the number of troops being flown back to South Africa were substantially lower than had been planned. In addition, the expected shipping had been delayed. Food was in short supply and the standard of discipline deteriorated further as men arriving at the depot were split up alphabetically and were not retained in their unit structures. A protest meeting was held on 20 August and as the size of the crowd increased, the meeting became more violent eventually resulting in the troops trashing, looting and burning numerous Egyptian premises, blocks of shops, motor cars, bungalows and book stalls as well as one of their own messes, and broke down and looted the NAAFI store. General Poole flew in from Italy to address the troops, promising that immediate steps were to be taken to speed up the rate of repatriation. Weeks later, the subsequent court of enquiry assessed the total cost of the damages at £22,768,431.

By 25 January 1946, 101,676 men had been ferried back to South Africa and the last aircraft left Egypt on 26 February 1946, carrying Major General Evered Poole who arrived in Durban on 2 March 1946.

=== Casualties ===
General Poole gave the campaign statistics for South African casualties as follows: Killed: 711; Wounded: 2,675; Missing: 157; Total: 3,543. (Note: The official statistics compiled by the AG Stats department of the British War Office give total South African casualties in the Italian campaign as 4,168.)

6th South African Armoured Division in Italy
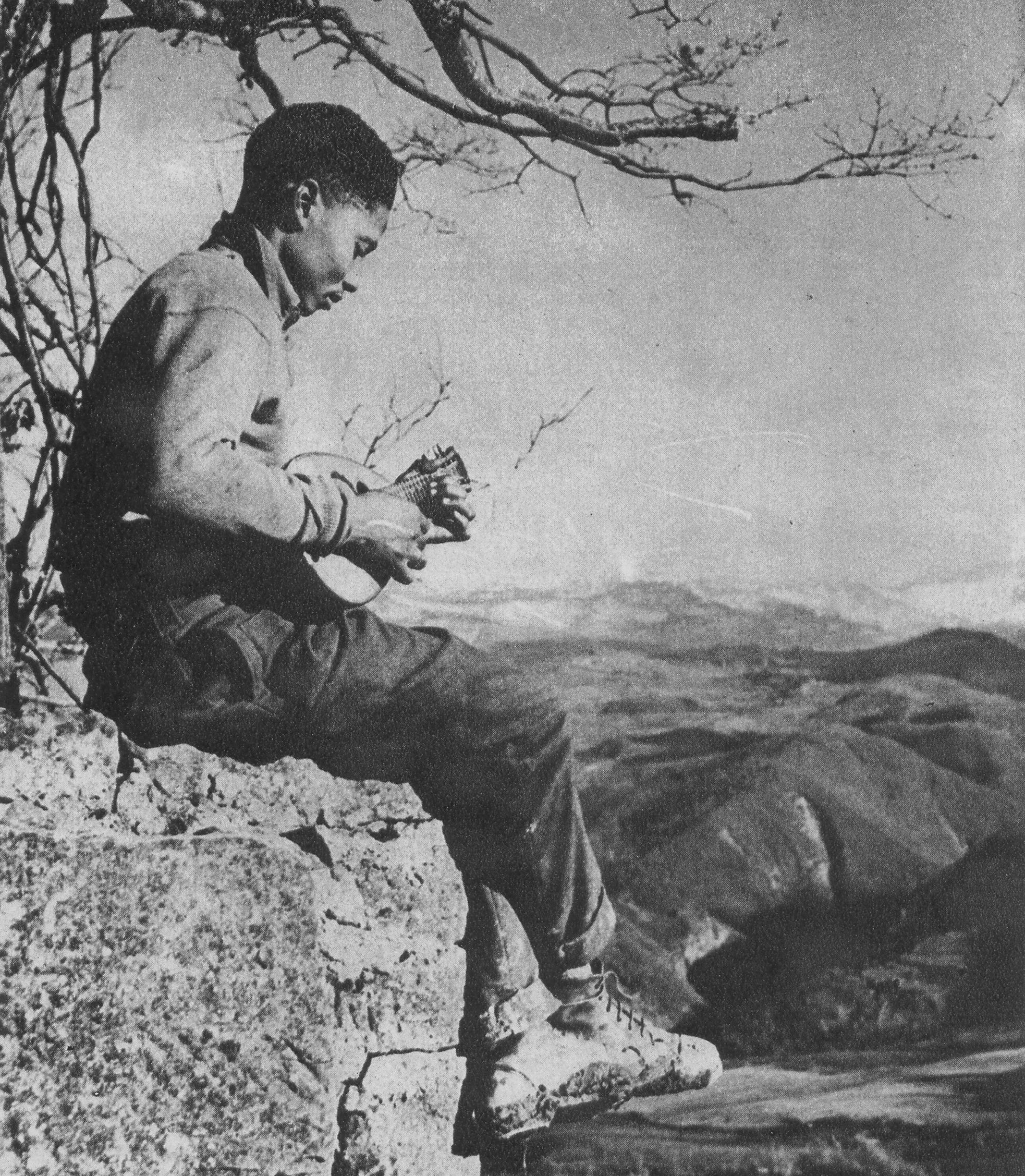
Driver of the South African Cape Corps close to Bologna. 1944.

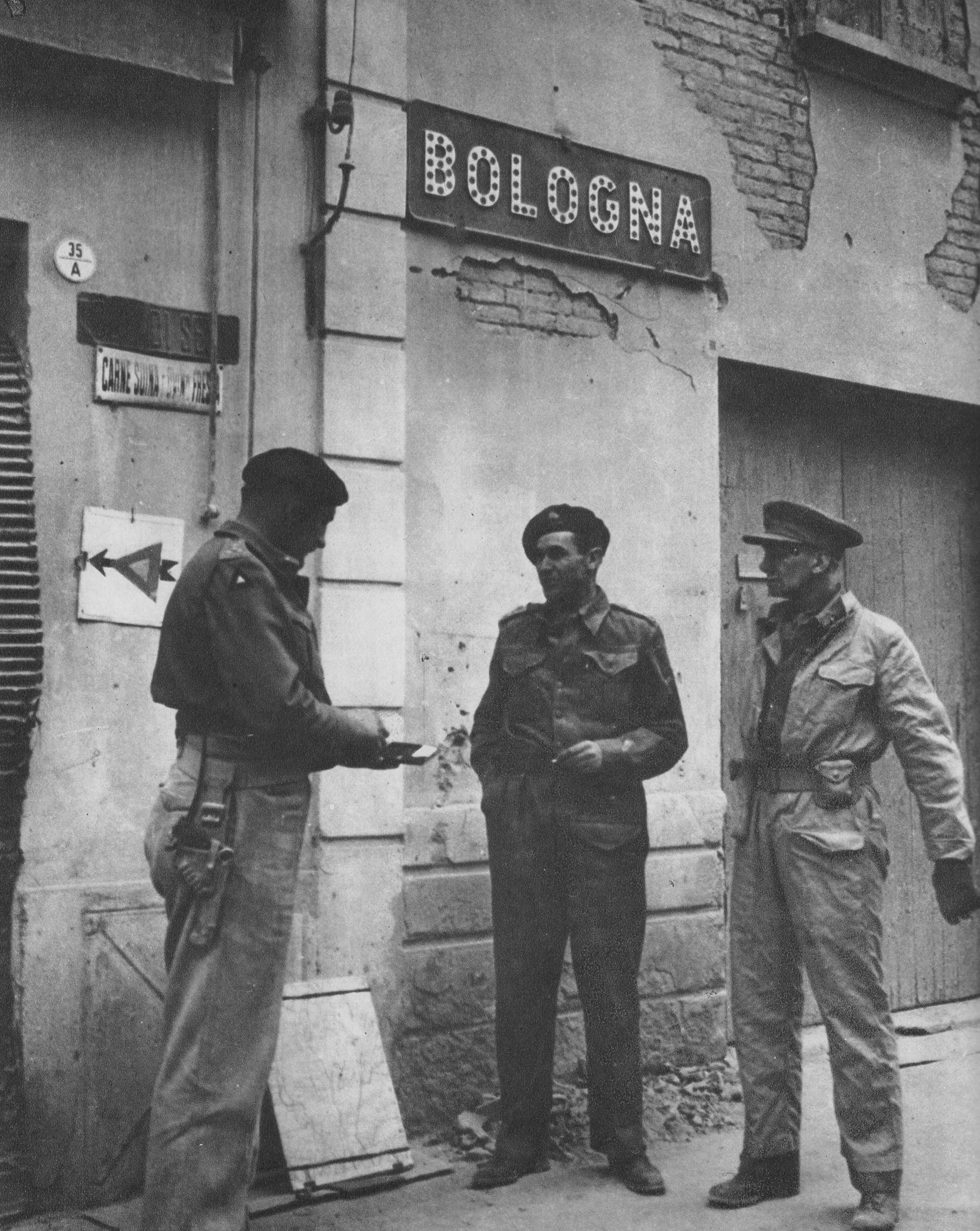
6 SA Armoured Division command staff in Bologna. Left to Right: Maj-Gen Poole, Brig. Furstenburg, Maj-Gen Theron.

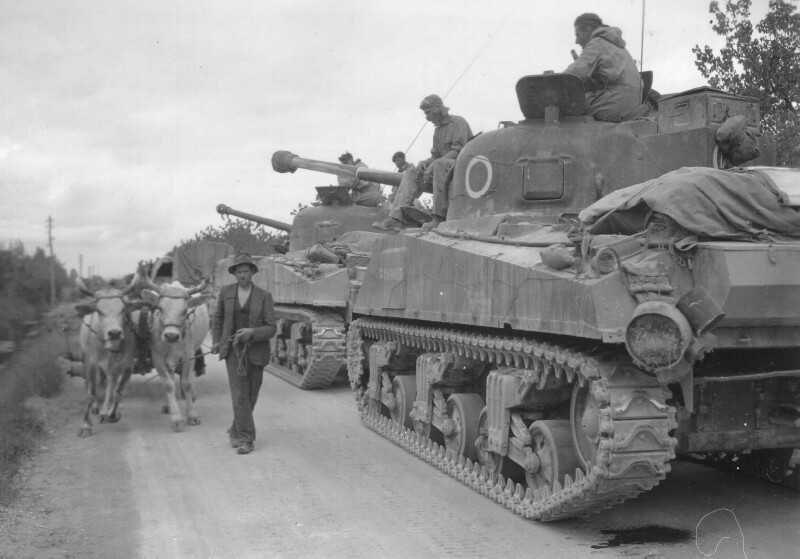
Sherman Firefly tanks of Pretoria Regiment in Italy in 1944

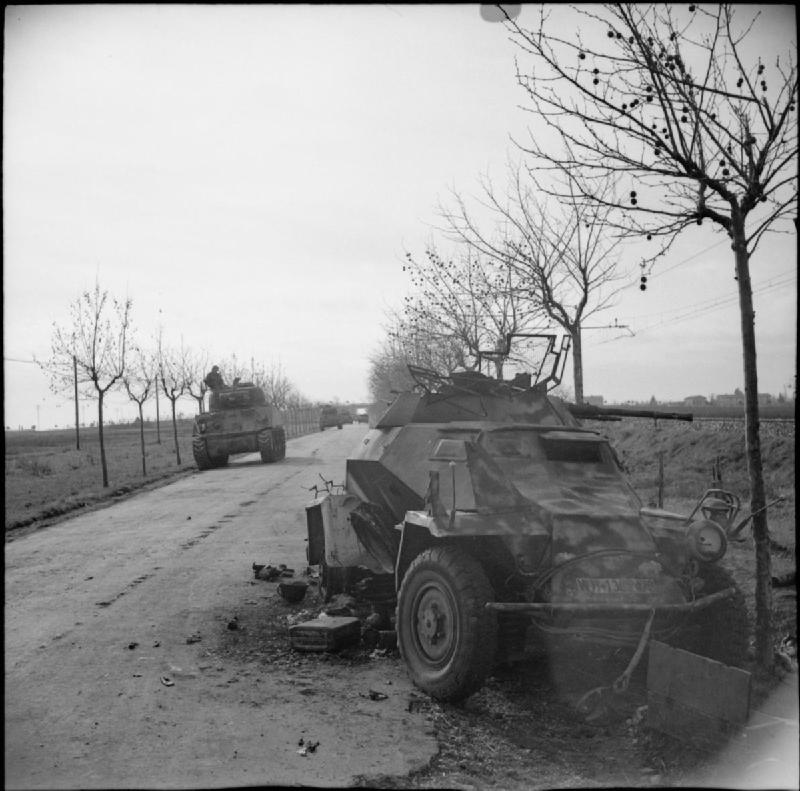
Shermans passing a knocked-out German Sd.Kfz. 222 armoured car, 25 January 1944.

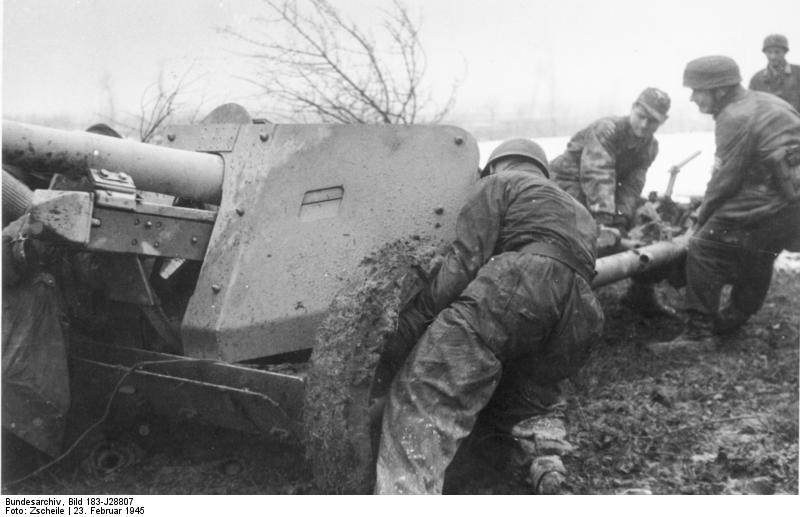
German paratroopers move a Pak-40 antitank gun into position: 23 February 1945.

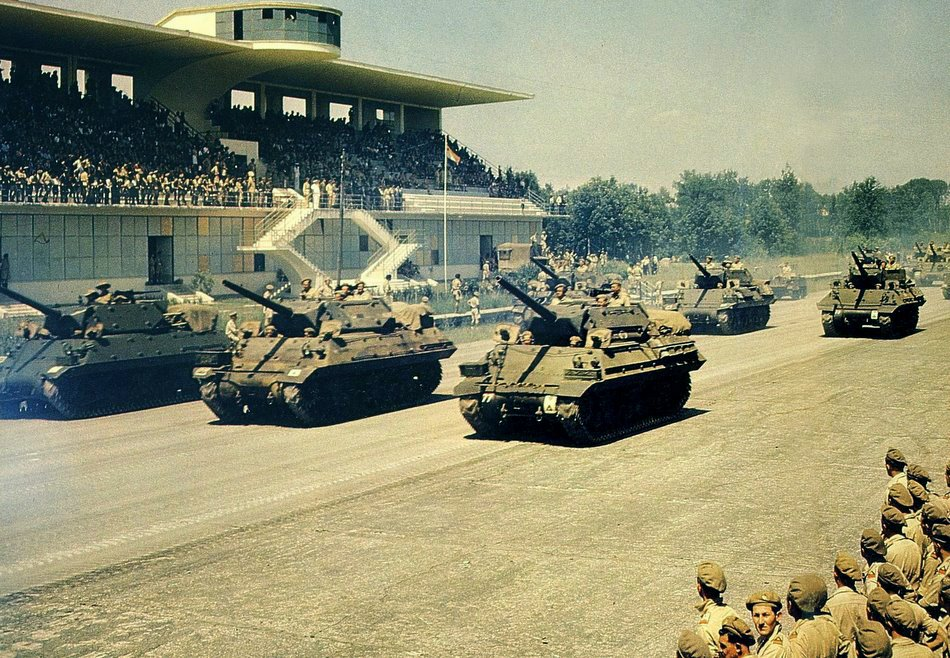
Victory Parade at Monza. 14 July 1945

== Command and organisation ==
=== Higher formations served under ===
Formation and period
HQ British Troops Egypt	1 May 1943	31 December 1943
III Corps	1 January 1944	14 March 1944
Egypt Force	14 March 1944	14 April 1944
8th Army Reserve	21 April 1944	28 May 1944
I Canadian Corps	28 May 1944	6 June 1944
XIII Corps	6 June 1944	
8th Army Reserve	6 August 1944	20 August 1944
IV US Corps	22 August 1944	7 October 1944
5 US Army	7 October 1944	31 October 1944
IV US Corps	31 October 1944	15 January 1945
II US Corps	15 January 1945	30 April 1945
5 US Army	30 April 1945	31 May 1945
GOC South African Defence Force	1 June 1945	1946

=== Order of battle ===
Order of battle as at the dates the division arrived in Italy and the end of hostilities.

Organization of South African 6th Armored Division as of 21 April 1944

(South Africa) 6th South African Armoured Division HQ
Date	21 April 1944 (Arrival in Italy)	2 May 1945 (End of hostilities)
Higher Formation:	British XIII Corps	US IV Corps
Commander:	Maj-Gen W.H.E. Poole	
Division Troops:	Royal Durban Light Infantry, South African Infantry Corps	Support Battalion DSR
Reconnaissance:	Natal Mounted Rifles, South African Armoured Corps	
Division Artillery:	Commander Divisional Artillery: Col J.N. Bierman	Commander Divisional Artillery: Brig J.N. Bierman
Division Artillery:	1st/6th Field Regiment, Cape Field Artillery	
Division Artillery:	4/22 Field Regiment, South African Artillery Corps	
Division Artillery:		166th (Newfoundland) Field Regiment, Royal Artillery
Division Artillery:	7th/23rd Medium Regiment, South African Artillery Corps	
Division Artillery:	1st/11th Anti-Tank Regiment, South African Artillery Corps	
Division Artillery:	1st/12th Light Anti-Aircraft Regiment, South African Artillery Corps	
Engineers:	17th Field Park Sqn, South African Engineering Corps	
Engineers:	12th Field Squadron, South African Engineering Corps	
Engineers:	8th Field Squadron, South African Engineering Corps	
Engineers:		622nd Field Squadron, Royal Engineers
Signals:	6 SA Div Signal Squadron, South African Corps of Signals	
Signals:	6 SA Div Artillery Signal Squadron, South African Artillery Corps	
Signals:	14th Mot Bde Signals Squadron, South African Corps of Signals	
Medical:	19th Field Ambulance, South African Medical Corps	
Medical:	20th Field Ambulance, South African Medical Corps	
(South Africa) 11th South African Armoured Brigade
Date	21 April 1944 (Arrival in Italy)	2 May 1945 (End of hostilities)
Commander:	Brig. J.P.A. Furstenburg	
Armour:	The Pretoria Regiment (Princess Alice's Own) (PR)	
Armour:	Prince Alfred's Guard (PAG)	
Armour:	Special Service Battalion (SSB)	
Infantry:	Imperial Light Horse / Kimberley Regiment (ILH/KimR)	4th/13th Frontier Force Rifles
(South Africa) 12th Motorised Infantry Brigade
Date	21 April 1944 (Arrival in Italy)	2 May 1945 (End of hostilities)
Commander:	Brig. R.J. Palmer	
Brigade Troops:		Regiment Botha/Regiment President Steyn (RB/RPS)
Infantry:	First City/Cape Town Highlanders (FC/CTH)	
Infantry:	Royal Natal Carbineers (RNC)	
Infantry:	Witwatersrand Rifles Regiment/Regiment de la Rey (WR/DLR)	
(South Africa) 13th Motorised Infantry Brigade
Date	21 April 1944 (Arrival in Italy)	2 May 1945 (End of hostilities)
Commander:	Not attached to the division at this time, joined in April 1945.	Brig. J.P. Bester
Infantry:	Not attached to the division at this time, joined in April 1945.	Imperial Light Horse / Kimberley Regiment (ILH/KimR)
Infantry:	Not attached to the division at this time, joined in April 1945.	Natal Mounted Rifles / South African Air Force Regiment
Infantry:	Not attached to the division at this time, joined in April 1945.	Royal Durban Light Infantry (RDLI)
Artillery:	Not attached to the division at this time, joined in April 1945.	15th Field Regiment, South African Artillery Corps
Engineers:	Not attached to the division at this time, joined in April 1945.	5th Field Company, South African Engineering Corps
Medical:	Not attached to the division at this time, joined in April 1945.	19th Field Ambulance, South African Medical Corps
Signals:	Not attached to the division at this time, joined in April 1945.	18th Motorised Brigade Signals
(United Kingdom) 24th Guards Brigade
Date	(Bde joined Div) 20 May 1944	2 May 1945 (End of hostilities)
Commander:	Brig. M.D. Erskine	No longer part of the division. Withdrawn on 18 February 1945 and assigned to 56th (London) Infantry Division
Infantry:	1st Battalion, The Scots Guards	No longer part of the division. Withdrawn on 18 February 1945 and assigned to 56th (London) Infantry Division
Infantry:	3rd Battalion, The Coldstream Guards	No longer part of the division. Withdrawn on 18 February 1945 and assigned to 56th (London) Infantry Division
Infantry:	5th Battalion, Grenadier Guards	No longer part of the division. Withdrawn on 18 February 1945 and assigned to 56th (London) Infantry Division
Engineers:	42nd Field Company, Royal Engineers	No longer part of the division. Withdrawn on 18 February 1945 and assigned to 56th (London) Infantry Division
Engineers:	24th Independent Brigade Group (Guards) Workshop	No longer part of the division. Withdrawn on 18 February 1945 and assigned to 56th (London) Infantry Division
Medical:	137th Field Ambulance, Royal Army Medical Corps	No longer part of the division. Withdrawn on 18 February 1945 and assigned to 56th (London) Infantry Division
Signals:	550th Company, Royal Corps of Signals	No longer part of the division. Withdrawn on 18 February 1945 and assigned to 56th (London) Infantry Division

=== Theatres of operation ===
Main theatres of operation:

- 1 February – 19 April 1943: South Africa
- 19 April 1943 – 30 April 1943: At sea
- 30 April 1943 – 16 April 1944: Egypt
- 16 April 1944 – 21 April 1944: At sea
- 21 April 1944 – 8 May 1945: Italy

=== Battles, actions and engagements ===
The division colours record the following actions:

Battle	Action or engagement	From	To
1944
Rome	Advance to the Tiber	22 May 1944	4 June 1944
	Celleno	9 June 1944	9 June 1944
	Bagnoregio	11 June 1944	13 June 1944
	Allerona	15 June 1944	15 June 1944
Trasimene Line		20 June 1944	30 June 1944
Arezzo		4 July 1944	17 July 1944
Advance to Florence	Monte San Michele	18 July 1944	20 July 1944
	Monte Domini	21 July 1944	24 July 1944
	Monte Kili	21 July 1944	23 July 1944
	Paula Line	30 July 1944	4 August 1944
Gothic Line	Monte Porro del Bagno	15 September 1944	18 September 1944
	Femmina Morta	17 September 1944	18 September 1944
	Catarelto Ridge	28 September 1944	3 October 1944
	Monte Vigese	30 September 1944	6 October 1944
	Monte Stanco	7 October 1944	13 October 1944
	Monte Salvaro	19 October 1944	23 October 1944
1945
Bologna	Monte Sole	15 April 1945	18 April 1945
	Camposanto Bridge	22 April 1945	22 April 1945

== See also ==
- Italian campaign (World War II)
- Gothic Line
- Spring 1945 offensive in Italy
