= 12th Motorised Brigade =

WWII military unit

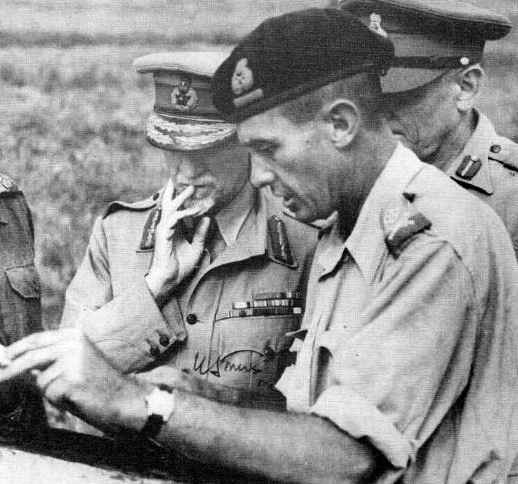
- The South African prime minister Field Marshal Jan Smuts, Maj. General Evered Poole (General Officer Commanding) and Lt. General Sir Pierre van Ryneveld (Chief of the General Staff), in Chiusi, Italy, 24 June 1944. The visit was to discuss the implications of the surrender of A Company, First City/Cape Town Highlanders.
- Active: 1943–1945
- Countries: South Africa, Rhodesia
- Branch: Army
- Type: Infantry
- Part of: 6th Armoured Division (South Africa)
- Engagements: Italian Campaign (WWII)

Commanders
- Notable commanders: Brig. R.J. Palmer

The 12th Motorised Brigade (South Africa) was a South African brigade-level infantry unit that served with the Allies in the Italian Campaign of World War II under the 6th South African Armoured Division. It was the first South African unit to enter combat in Italy. The unit was activated in 1943 and had generally deactivated by 8 May 1945.

== Formation ==
The 12th Motorized Brigade was officially formed under the 6th Armoured Division (South Africa) on 8 February 1943 as a mismatched collection of volunteers from various units previously serving in North Africa, as interest in fighting in Italy was low among South African soldiers. The unit was led by Brig. R.J. Palmer, and sailed, along with the rest of the 6th, to Port Tewfik on the Suez Canal on 30 April 1943. The brigade received training in the Kataba desert in the northwest of Cairo, Egypt, culminating in the three-day "Exercise Durban", which ran from 5–7 December 1943.

== Composition ==
Units under the 12th Motorised Brigade included:

- First City Regiment / Cape Town Highlanders (FC/CTH), commanded by Lt. Col. O.N. Flemmer
  - A Company – 3 platoons with 3-ton lorries (Rifle/LMG), Company Headquarters (CHQ) with jeeps and scout cars
  - B Company – 3 platoons with 3-ton lorries (Rifle/LMG), CHQ with jeeps and scout cars (ex-Rhodesian infantry)
  - C Company – 3 platoons with 3-ton lorries (Rifle/LMG), CHQ with jeeps and scout cars
  - D Company – 3 platoons with 3-ton lorries (Rifle/LMG), CHQ with jeeps and scout cars
  - Support Company – 3 Anti-Tank platoons (12x QF 6-pdr anti-tank guns with or without Bedford QLT 3-ton lorries Portee), 2 Medium machine gun platoons (8 machine-guns with MMG carriers), 1 Reconnaissance Platoon (9 Universal Carriers), 1 mortar platoon (six 3 inch mortars in Morris 15-cwt trucks with 2 OPs in Universal Carriers)
- Royal Natal Carbineers (RNC), commanded by Lt. Col. M.P. Comrie
  - A Company – 3 platoons with 3-ton lorries (Rifle/LMG), CHQ with jeeps and scout cars
  - B Company – 3 platoons with 3-ton lorries (Rifle/LMG), CHQ with jeeps and scout cars
  - C Company – 3 platoons with 3-ton lorries (Rifle/LMG), CHQ with jeeps and scout cars
  - D Company – 3 platoons with 3-ton lorries (Rifle/LMG), CHQ with jeeps and scout cars
  - Support Company – 3 Anti-Tank platoons (12x OQF 6-pdr with or without Bedford QLT 3-ton lorries Portee), 2 MMG platoons (8 machine-guns with MMG carriers), 1 Reconnaissance Platoon (9 Universal Carriers), 1 mortar platoon (six 3" mortars in Morris 15-cwt trucks with 2 OPs in Universal Carriers)
- Witwatersrand Rifles / Regiment de la Rey (WR/DLR), commanded by Lt. Col. J.B. "Happy Jack" Bester
  - A Company – 3 platoons with 3-ton lorries (Rifle/LMG), CHQ with jeeps and scout cars
  - B Company – 3 platoons with 3-ton lorries (Rifle/LMG), CHQ with jeeps and scout cars
  - C Company – 3 platoons with 3-ton lorries (Rifle/LMG), CHQ with jeeps and scout cars
  - D Company – 3 platoons with 3-ton lorries (Rifle/LMG), CHQ with jeeps and scout cars
  - Support Company – 3 AT platoons (12x OQF 6-pdr with or without Bedford QLT 3-ton lorries Portee), 2 MMG platoons (8 machine-guns with MMG carriers), 1 Reconnaissance Platoon (9 Universal Carriers), 1 mortar platoon (six 3" mortars in Morris 15-cwt trucks with 2 OPs in Universal Carriers)

Attached and added units:

- 74th Light Anti-Aircraft Regiment, Royal Artillery, commanded by Lt. Col. A.C Long (attached 25 August – 28 September 1944, temporarily converted to infantry)
  - A Company – 3 platoons with 3-ton lorries (Rifle/LMG)
  - B Company – 3 platoons with 3-ton lorries (Rifle/LMG)
  - C Company – 3 platoons with 3-ton lorries (Rifle/LMG)
  - D Company – 3 platoons with 3-ton lorries (Rifle/LMG)
  - Support Company – 1 AT platoon (12x OQF 6-pdr with or without Bedford QLT 3-ton lorries Portee), 1 mortar platoon (six 3" mortars in Morris 15-cwt trucks with 2 OPs in Universal Carriers)
- 2/23 Battery (attached)
  - 2 Sherman ARVs
  - 2 sets of 4 M10 "Grouse" (3") SP Troop
  - 4 OQF 17-pdr Troop with Morris C8 Quad Tractors
- 12th Field Squadron, commanded by Major R.M.M. Cormack (engineers, attached)
  - Squadron HQ – Daimler Dingo armoured cars and scout cars
  - Reconnaissance – Daimler Dingo armoured cars and scout cars
  - 1/12 Troop with 3-ton lorries
  - 2/12 Troop with 3-ton lorries
  - 3/12 Troop with 3-ton lorries
- Regiment Botha / Regiment President Steyn (RB/RPS), commanded by Lt. Col. A. S. Nel (incorporated on 23 March 1945 from the 1st South African Motorised Brigade)
  - A Company (Heavy) – 3 MMG platoons (18 machine-guns with MMG carriers)
  - C Company (Heavy) – 3 MMG platoons (18 machine-guns with MMG carriers)

== Italian Campaign ==
After receiving orders, the 6th sailed from Alexandria, Egypt on 16 April 1944 and arrived in Taranto, Italy, on the 20th. After arrival, 12th Brigade was detached from the 6th and ordered to move to S. Elia, a mountainous region north of Monte Cassino that featured a section of the Gustav Line, to relieve the 11th Canadian Infantry Brigade. Under the command of the 2nd New Zealand Division of the British X Corps, the 12th took over the sector on 6 May and held it until 23 May, after the fall of Monte Cassino, when they were reincorporated into 6th Division.

As part of the Allied drive northwards in Italy, the 12th took the town of Paliano on 3 June. After the Allies took Rome on 4 June, the 6th Armoured was ordered to push upwards on the Via Casilina to take over the spearhead of the British XIII Corps, passing through Rome on 6 June. After continuing to march with the 6th Armoured Division up through Italy, a regiment of the 12th, the First City / Cape Town Highlanders, took the lead and captured the important Orvieto road junction on 14 June.

Next, 6th Division met the LXXVI Panzer Corps on the Georg Line north of Route 73. 12th Brigade took one side of the attack, advancing along the road and eventually helping capture Radda on 17 July. On 20 July, the 12th attacked and took Mt. St. Michele, an important strategic position for control over the Arno Valley and Allied advances into France. After taking over part of the front at Arno River with Prince Arnold's Guard and the 74th Light Anti-Aircraft Regiment, the 12th eventually crossed the Arno on the night of 28–29 August 1944. At this point, the 12th was tasked with sending armed patrols to determine the extent of German withdrawal from the region, which was undertaken by the Royal Natal Carbineers and the FC/CTH.

C Company of the RNC liberated the town of Artimino on 1 September. The RNC liberated Pistoia on 8 September. On 11 September, the 6th Armoured regrouped, with the 12th Motorised Brigade put in the center of the formation. The 12th moved up Highway 64, with the FC/CTH crossing the Apennine watershed at Collin on 27 September. On 8 October, the 12th was moved up to hold the Mt. Vegese-Montevolo area. The RNC had been separated from the brigade several weeks earlier to capture Mt. Vegese with the 11th Motorised Brigade. Next, the brigade was assigned the task of taking Mt. Stanco, which it accomplished by 13 October, with the Witwatersrand Rifles reaching the summit by 05:59 that morning. FC/CTH was assigned to take Point 650, which they accomplished by mid-afternoon.

Several units from the 12th were assigned to take Mt. Salvaro and Mt. Pezza, which they accomplished by 25 October.

After a slow winter, 12th Brigade once again moved up to the front on the night of 31 March 1945. To capture Mt. Sole and Mt. Caprara, the brigade's next objectives, the 12th advanced along the ridge of Mt. Sole. WR/DLR and FC/CTH attacked on 15 April and had captured the summits of the mountains by the evening of the next day, although WR/DLR suffered 168 casualties in the process. On 22 April 1945, the 12th Motorised Brigade reached Camposanto, which had been previously liberated by American troops. On the afternoon of 24 April, the 12th reached the banks of the Po River, rounding up 487 German prisoners in the process.

== Post-War activity ==
After the end of the war in Europe in May 1945, the 12th was assigned occupation duty in the Aosta Valley on the Franco-Italian border. An official announcement was made by the Union Defence Force on 9 August that South Africans abroad would be sent home in waves, with priority given to those who had served abroad for the longest time. As demobilisation took place on an individual basis, unit structure was lost. By 26 February 1946, all South African soldiers had been sent home.

== Retirement ==
Separate units of the 12th Motorised Brigade demobilised on different dates. The 1st Witwatersrand Rifles and Regiment de la Rey disbanded on 30 June 1943, forming the combined WR/DLR regiment that lasted until 8 May 1945. The First City Regiment disbanded on 5 October 1943. FC/CTH, RB/RPS, and RNC all demobilised on 8 May 1945.
