= Kimberley Regiment =

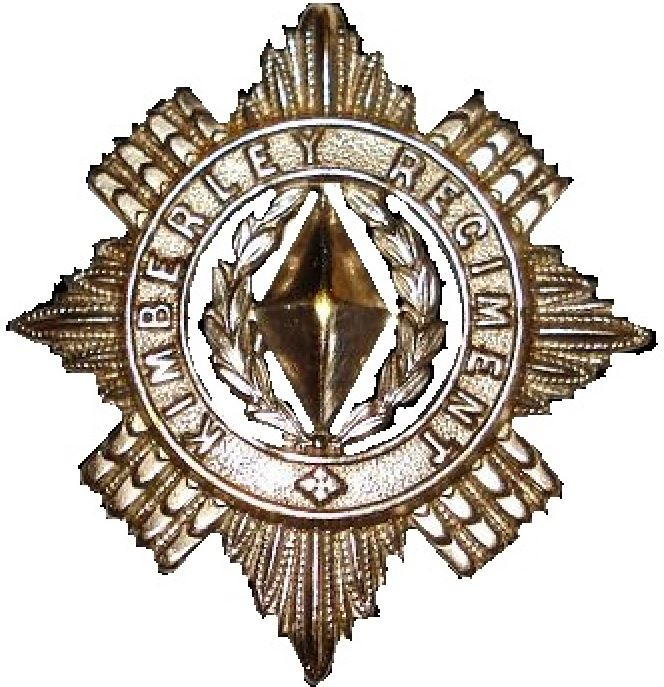
- SANDF Kimberly Regiment emblem
- Active: 1890 to present
- Country: South Africa
- Allegiance: Republic of South Africa; Republic of South Africa
- Branch: South African Army; South African Army
- Type: Infantry
- Role: Light infantry
- Size: One battalion
- Part of: South African Infantry Formation; Army Conventional Reserve
- Garrison/HQ: Kimberley
- Battle honours: Gaika-Gcaleka 1877 - 1878; Griqualand West 1878; Basutoland 1880 - 1881; Transkei 1880 - 1881; Bechuanaland 1896 - 1897; Siege of Kimberley; South Africa 1899 - 1902; South-West Africa 1914 - 1915; Italy 1944 - 1945; Cassino II; Celleno; Florence; The Greve; Gothic Line; Monte Porro del Bagno; Monte Vigese; Monte Salvaro; Po Valley

Insignia
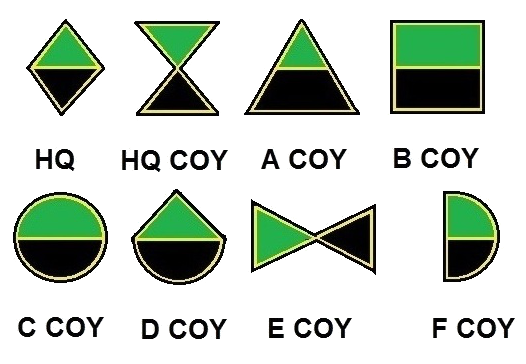
- Company level Insignia

- SA Motorised Infantry beret bar circa 1992

The Kimberley Regiment is an infantry regiment of the South African Army. As a reserve unit, it has a status roughly equivalent to that of a British Army Reserve or United States Army National Guard unit.

== History ==
=== Volunteer Forces on the Diamond Fields ===
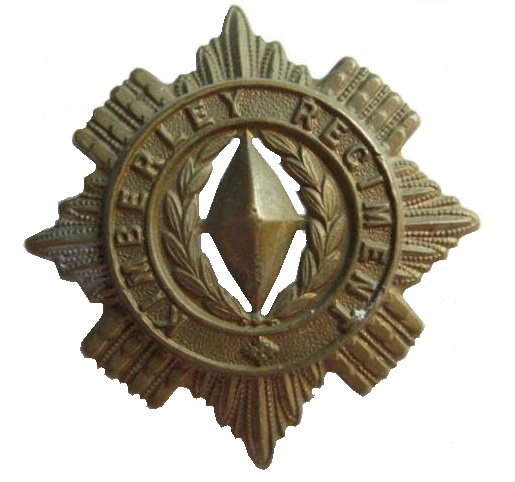
Kimberley Regiment Cap Badge circa 1899

The regiment's origins lie in the early, lawless, diamond rush days in Kimberley in the 1870s. To bring law and order to the region, which was then known as Griqualand West, the government encouraged the formation of part-time volunteer forces. Among them were the Kimberley Light Horse and the Du Toitspan Hussars, both formed in 1876, which amalgamated in 1877 to form the Diamond Fields Horse. Volunteers from the DFH served in the 9th Frontier War in 1877, in operations in Griqualand West in 1878, and in the Basutoland Gun War in 1880 and 1881.

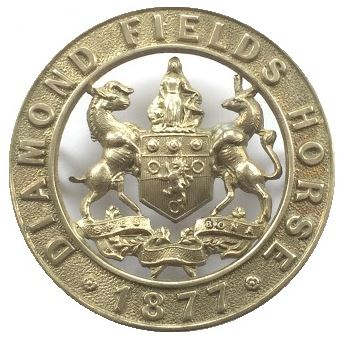
Diamond Fields Horse insignia circa 1877

Kimberley later raised two more units, the Victoria Rifles of Kimberley in 1887, and the Kimberley Scots in 1890. They, along with the Diamond Fields Artillery, amalgamated in 1890 to form the Kimberley Rifles. Both the DFH and the Kimberley Rifles served in the 1896-1897 Bechuanaland campaign. In 1899, the two units amalgamated to form the Kimberley Regiment.

Regimental traditions have survived from each of the constituent cavalry, artillery and rifle units, with a distinctly Scottish element very much in evidence in the uniforms, pipe band and regimental culture to this day.

=== Anglo Boer War ===
During the Anglo-Boer War of 1899 to 1902, the Regiment helped to defend the city during the four-month-long Siege of Kimberley. It is one of only two regiments of the British Empire holding as a Battle Honour the defence of its own city - in this instance Defence of Kimberley.

=== Union Defence Force ===
On 1 July 1913 the Regiment was embodied in the Citizen Force of the Union Defence Forces, as the 7th Infantry (Kimberley Regiment).

=== World War One ===
During World War I, it fought in the German South-West Africa campaign in 1915, providing two battalions. It further provided 'C' Company of the composite 1st Regiment of the 1st South African Brigade which fought in France. At Delville Wood, Private William Faulds (later Captain VC MC) was the only South African to be awarded the Victoria Cross for his part in that epic battle.

The title of the Regiment reverted to Kimberley Regiment in 1932.

=== World War Two ===
During World War II, the Kimberley Regiment fought in Italy in 1944 and 1945, forming the Motor Battalion together with the Imperial Light Horse Regiment in the Armoured Brigade of the 6th South African Armoured Division throughout the Italian Campaign. Winning Battle Honours and awards for bravery, the Kimberley Regiment also suffered more casualties than any other South African regiment in the campaign.

=== Border War ===
Kimberley Regiment was the first to become officially bilingual (English and Afrikaans) in South Africa, in 1963. It was later, in 1977, the first South African Regiment to apply to become multiracial, although the request was not approved at the time.

The regiment served in the South African Border War in the 1970s and 1980s.

=== SANDF Era ===
Since 1994 it has been deployed in peace-keeping roles in the Sudan and the Democratic Republic of Congo.

== Leadership ==
Leadership
| From | Honorary Colonel | To | Ribbon |
|---|---|---|---|
| | No known incumbents | | |
| From | Officer Commanding | To | Ribbon |
| | No known incumbents | | |
| From | Regimental Sergeants Major | To | Ribbon |
| | No known incumbents | | |

== Alliances ==
- United Kingdom - The Duke of Lancaster's Regiment (King's Lancashire and Border)

== Battle honours ==
The twenty authorised Battle Honours on the Regimental Colour include:

Battle Honours
Awarded to Kimberley Regiment
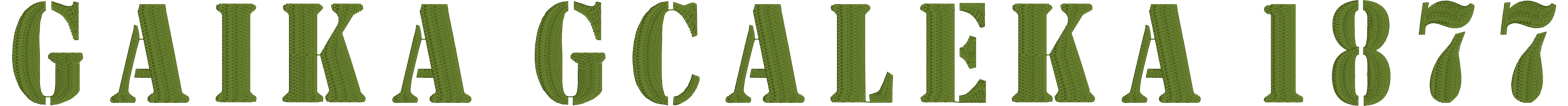
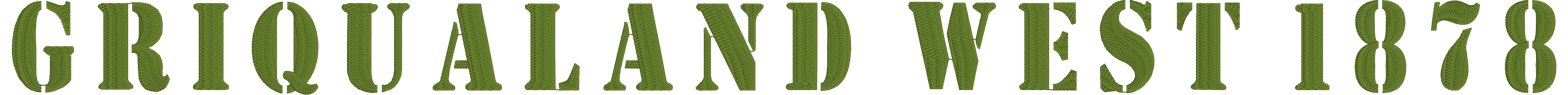
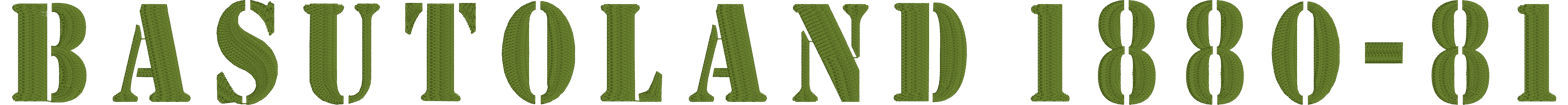
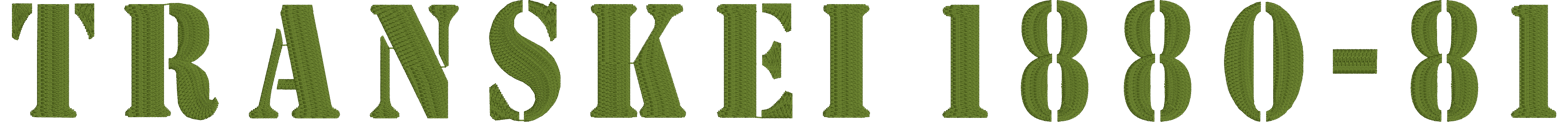
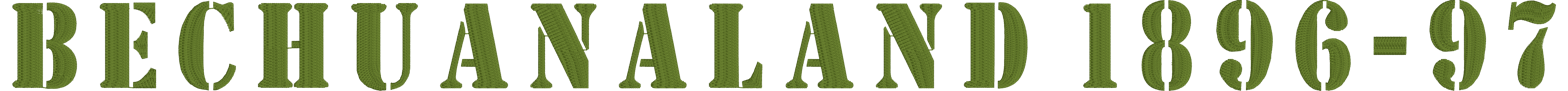
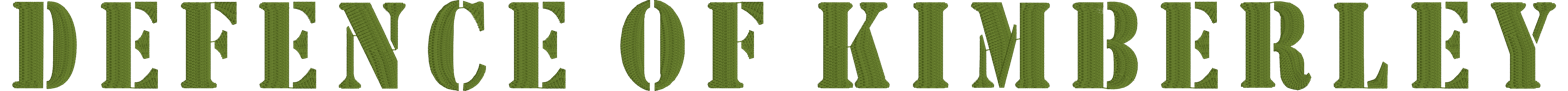
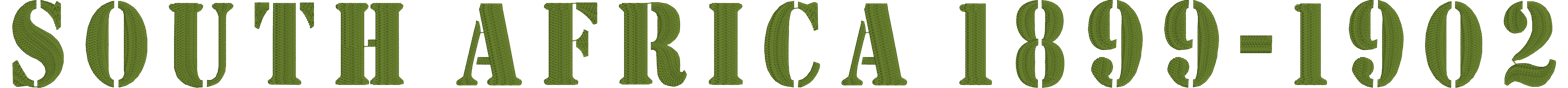
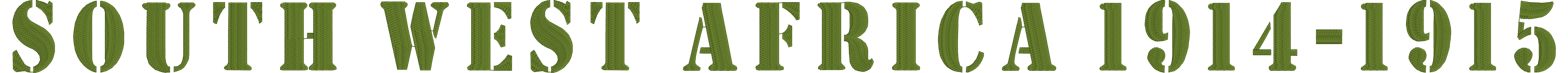
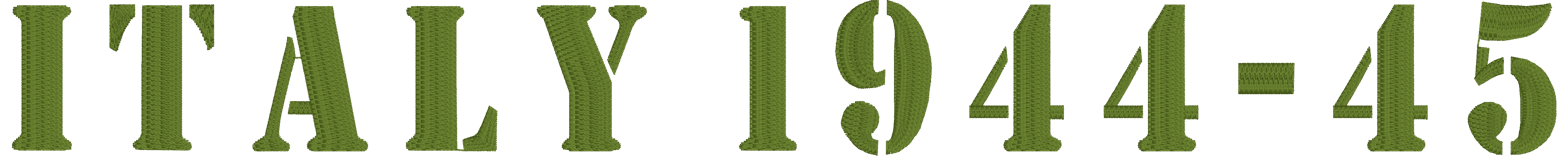
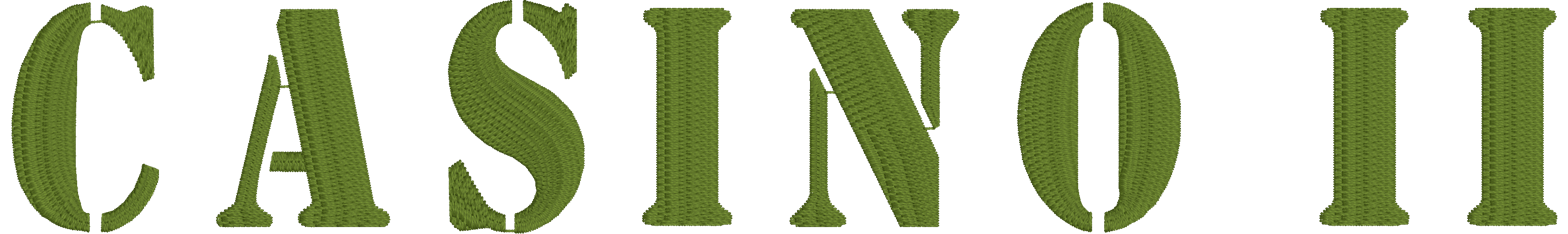
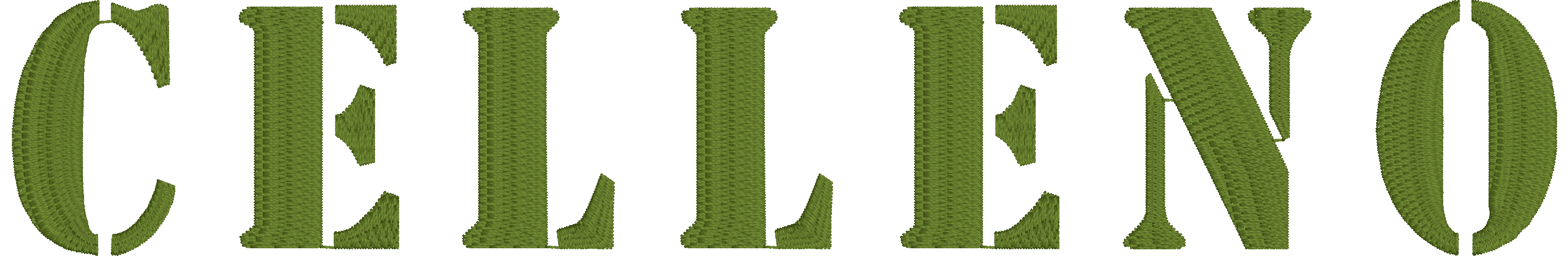
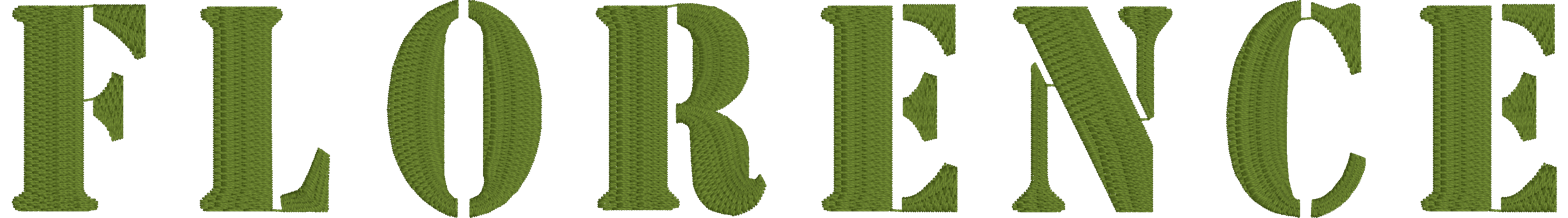
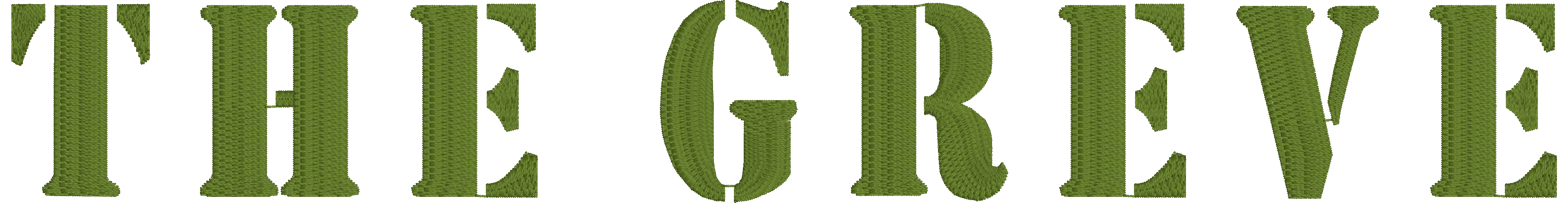
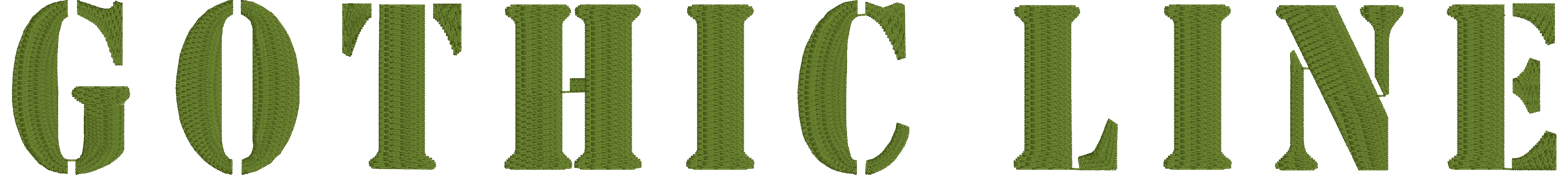
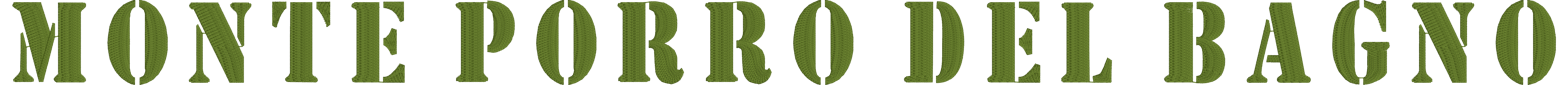
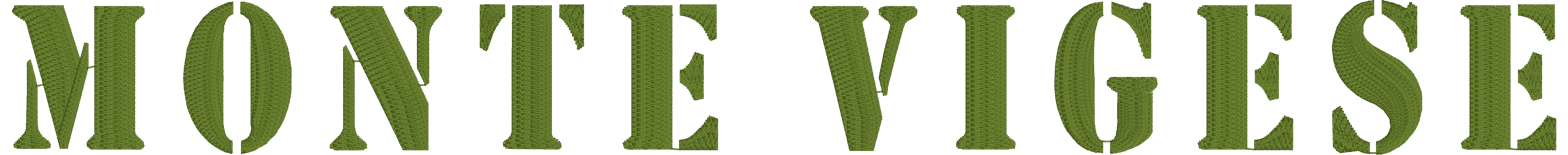
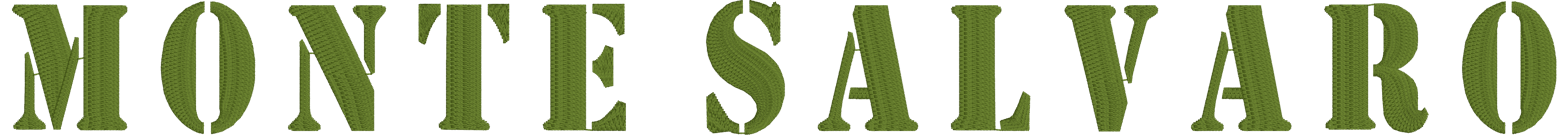
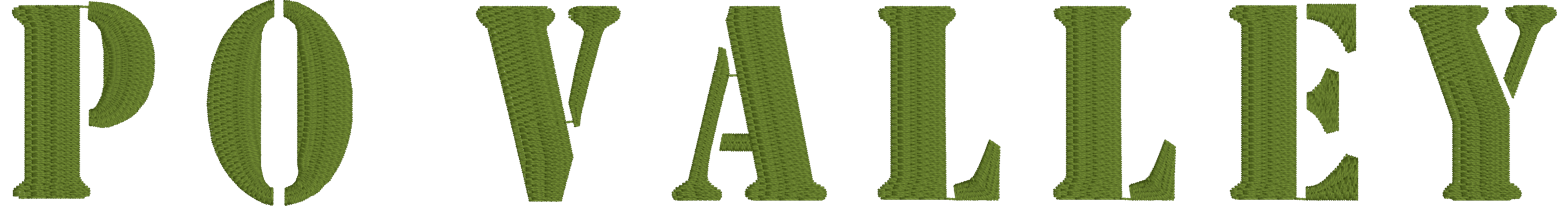

- Gaika-Gcaleka 1877 - 1878
- Griqualand West 1878
- Basutoland 1880 - 1881
- Transkei 1880 - 1881
- Bechuanaland 1896 - 1897
- Siege of Kimberley
- South Africa 1899 - 1902
- South-West Africa 1914 - 1915
- Italy 1944 - 1945
- Cassino II
- Celleno
- Florence
- The Greve
- Gothic Line
- Monte Porro del Bagno
- Monte Vigese
- Monte Salvaro
- Po Valley

== Insignia ==
=== Current Dress Insignia ===
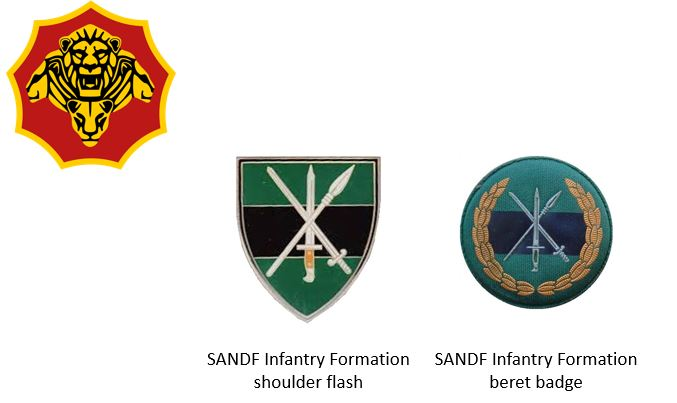
SANDF era Infantry Formation insignia

== See also ==
- Kimberley Star
