= A. C. Chemaly =

South-African army officer both in the Citizen Force and later in the Permanent Force

Brigadier General Anthony Christopher Chemaly SM MMM JCD
- Born: Anthony Christopher; 9 April 1929; Queenstown, Eastern Cape
- Died: October 24, 2016; George, Western Cape
- Military career
- Allegiance: South Africa
- Branch: South African Army
- Service years: 1947-2009; Brigadier General Anthony Christopher Chemaly SM MMM JCD was a senior Officer in the South African Army and later the: Honorary Colonel First City Regiment 1989–2009
- Nickname: Tony

Brigadier General Anthony Christopher Chemaly SM MMM JCD was a General Officer in the South African Army.

== Early life ==
General Chemaly was the RSM of Cadet Detachment No 3 QC in the year he matriculated from Queen's College and went on to graduate from Royal Military Academy Sandhurst.

== Civilian career ==
During the period as a Citizen Force Officer, General Chemaly also had a civilian career in the Motor Trade, He was a well known businessman in the Queenstown area and a Town Councillor he was also the President of the SA Legion. The General also held a Private Pilot License (PPL).

== Retirement ==
General Chemaly retired from the Permanent Force in 1988, but remained active over the period 1989 until 2009 in the post of Honorary Colonel of the First City Regiment.

== Awards ==
General Chemaly received the following 10 Decorations, medals & 3 awards during his Military career:

=== Medals and decorations ===
- Southern Cross Medal (1975) (SM)

The 1952 SM

- Military Merit Medal (MMM)
- Pro Patria Medal
- Southern Africa Medal
- General Service Medal (South Africa)
- Unitas (Unity) Medal
- Medal for Distinguished Conduct and Loyal Service (40 Years)

The ribbon of the SADF MDCLS

- Good Service Medal (Gold (30 Years))

The ribbon of the CF 30 year Good Service Medal Gold

- John Chard Decoration (JCD)
- John Chard Medal

=== Proficiency Awards ===
General Chemaly was the holder of the Emblem for Voluntary Service EVS in the CF. As Honorary Colonel he received the Badge for Reserve Force Voluntary Service in the RF he also was awarded the OC First City Commendation Chest badge

Badge for Voluntary Reserve Force Service (Service Award)
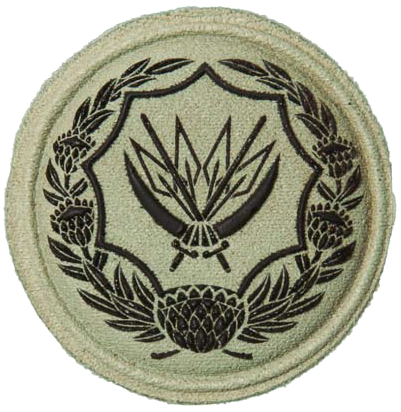
Five Years Voluntary Service. Black on Thatch beige, Embossed.

(Note: . The BVRS replaced the EVS)

== Notes ==
Military offices
Unknown	Director of Manpower Liaison on the Personal Staff of Chief SA Army; 1983 – 1988	Unknown
Unknown	Honorary Colonel First City Regiment; 1989 – 2009	Succeeded by Col Cecil Peter Jones-Phillipson
