= Chief Makhanda Regiment =

South African Army reserve air assault infantry regiment

First Eastern Rifles First City Chief Makhanda Regiment
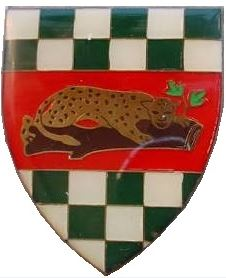
- SANDF First City emblem
- Active: 1875 to present
- Country: South Africa
- Allegiance: Republic of South Africa; Republic of South Africa (1994–present)
- Branch: South African Army; South African Army (1994–present)
- Type: Light Infantry
- Role: Air Assault and Training
- Size: One Air Assault battalion & a Training Wing
- Part of: South African Infantry Formation; Army Conventional Reserve
- Garrison/HQ: RHQ: Drill Hall, Hill Street, Grahamstown; Training Base: Fort Ihlosi Training Base, Grahamstown Military Base
- Nicknames: The Fighting Grahams (Airborne Highlanders); During WW2 the FC/CTH wore the Green and Gold Hackle and were nicknamed "the Budgies"
- Colours (8): 1. 1876 Regimental FCVA; 2. 1904 Kings Colour QVR; 3. 1904 Kings Colour FCV; 4. 1905 Regimental Colour QVR; 5. 1905 Regimental Colour FCV; 6. 1965 Regimental Colour FC Damaged by fire 7. 1969 Regimental Colour FC; 8. 1989 National Colour FC
- March: Bonny Dundee
- Mascot: Albany Leopard
- Anniversaries: Founders Weekend closest weekend to 18 November; Delvillewood July of each year

Commanders
- Colonel-in-Chief: The Duke of Kent, Maj Gen, Prince George KG MC GCVO 1935–1942; The Duke of Montrose KT CB KCVO 1946–1961
- Honorary Colonel: Col Cecil Peter Jones-Phillipson SM (Appointed 2010)

Insignia
- Abbreviation: CMR
- Tartan: Graham of Montrose
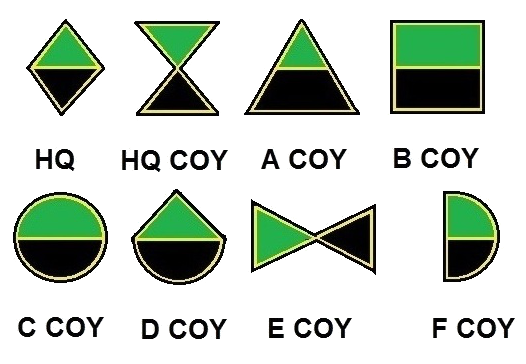
- Company level Insignia

- SA Motorised Infantry beret bar circa 1992: SA Motorised Infantry beret bar

The Chief Makhanda Regiment (formerly known as the First City) is a reserve air assault infantry regiment of the South African Army.

== History ==
=== Colony Frontier ===
The regiment was formed from the First City Volunteers (FCV) of Grahamstown that were formed in 1875 in Grahamstown and the Queenstown Rifle Volunteers (QVR) that were formed in 1860 (Re-raised 1883) in Queenstown and these regiments were formed due to the unrest on the then frontier.

The QVR and the FCV fought in the Cape Frontier Wars and the 9th Frontier War (1877–1878). The QVR fought in the Morosi Campaign (1879). The FCV fought in the Basutoland Gun War (1880–1881). The QVR and the FCV later fought in the Bechuanaland campaign (1897), and in the Second Boer War (1899–1902).

=== Union Defence Force ===
On 1 July 1913, the QVR amalgamated with the FCV and was incorporated into the Citizen Force of the new Union Defence Force as the 4th Infantry (First Eastern Rifles). It served in German South-West Africa 1914–1915.

However, in 1924 the First Eastern Rifles were renamed the 4th Infantry (First City). The numerical part of the title was dropped in 1932, making the regiment simply First City.

In the mid-1930s, the regiment adopted Scottish uniform, including the Graham of Montrose tartan.

=== World War II ===
During World War II, FC served in the Madagascar campaign (1942). On 5 October 1943, First City, South Africa's senior Scottish unit, was temporarily "married up" with the Cape Town Highlanders to form the FC/CTH which was part of the 12th South African Motorised Brigade of the South African 6th Armoured Division. The "marriage" lasted until 8 May 1945. After completing its training in Egypt, the division landed at Taranto, Italy on 20 April 1944 and fought exclusively in Italy during its existence. In 1946, the regiment was reconstituted as a component of the country's part-time forces and reformed First City.

From 1954 to 1956, FC was amalgamated with the Kaffrarian Rifles, known as First City/Kaffrarian Rifles. In 1956 it reverted to being called First City.

=== Border War ===
The regiment served in the South African Border War from 1977 to 1986, and was also involved from 1983 until 1994 in Internal Operations. The regiment was affiliated with 84 Motorised Brigade, part of 8th Armoured Division.

=== Post 1994 ===
In 2004 it was decided to rebuild First City and by 2006 the regiment was training its own members as well as members of the Prince Alfred's Guard, The Buffalo Volunteer Rifles and Regiment Piet Retief these all being Eastern Cape regiments. Many members have also been trained in Air Assault. The Regiment has also sent members on UN & AU peace keeping missions to the DRC, Burundi and the Sudan.

2008 saw First City winning the trophy for the best reserve force regiment in the SA Army Infantry Formation. The regiment retained this award for 2009.

=== Name change ===
In August 2019, 52 Reserve Force units had their names changed to reflect the diverse military history of South Africa. The First City became the Chief Makhanda Regiment, and have 3 years to design and implement new regimental insignia.

== Regimental symbols ==
=== Badges ===
Air Assault (Qualification)
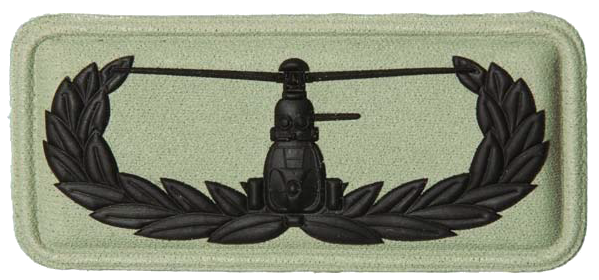
Black on Thatch beige, Embossed. Small Helicopter with wings

- Bonny Badge: silver crest of Montrose; directly behind the void areas of the badge on the Montrose tartan the following is worn:
  - Scarlet – officers and warrant officers
  - Blue – All other members
  - Maroon – All Airborne qualified members
  - The officers & WOs wear a diamond-shaped tartan backing, while the NCOs and Rfn wear a square tartan backing.
- Cap badge backing (1935– ): Graham of Montrose tartan. 1935 to 1943 pale red hackle also worn.
- 1943 to 1945 only a green and gold hackle was worn during this period. FC/CTH
- Collar badge: albany leopard on a branch
- Shoulder & epaulette title: "First City"
  - Officers & WOs wear the gold metal epaulette designation on the red tab.
  - NCOs & Rfn wear a gold and green cloth shoulder title

Helmet Flash - First City Regiment - 1924 - 1935

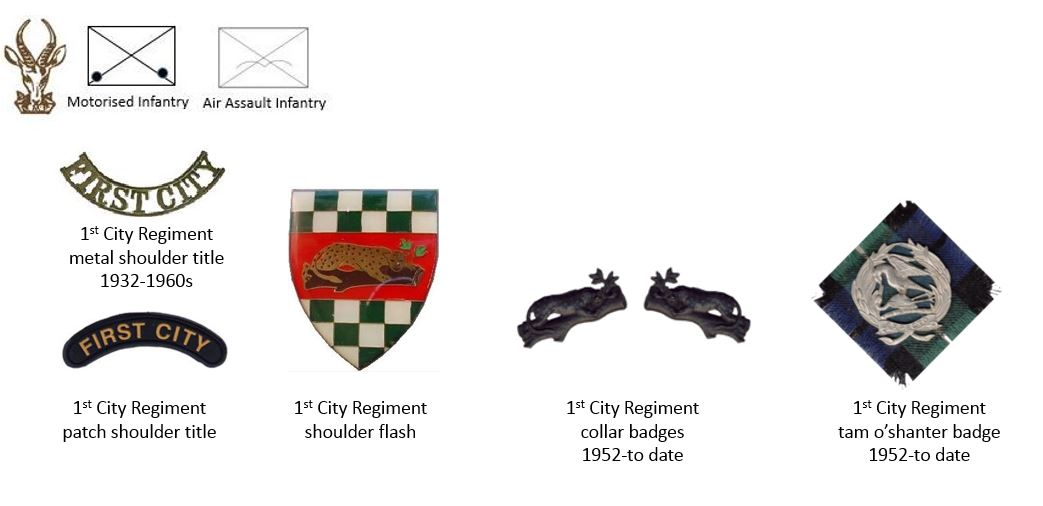
SADF era First City Regiment insignia

=== Headdress ===
Blue Balmoral bonnet with blue and white dicing, with a red toorie in 1935. The regiment's Highland company wore a Tam o'shanter without the toorie from 1906 to 1913, while the pipers wore a dark blue Glengarry. The new blue glengarry with blue and white dicing has the Maroon toorie to symbolise the regiment's airborne role. (Worn by officers & WOs) The khaki tam o'shanter when worn by air assault members has a maroon toorie. (Worn by S/Sgt/Rfn) The officers and WOs when in service/combat dress wear the light khaki balmoral.

=== Tartan ===
Graham of Montrose. The highland company was kilted in 1906, while the officers and warrant officers were allowed to wear trews from 1935 and the whole regiment was kilted in 1940.

=== Motto ===
New motto: "Expecto" (be alert/be prepared/I await)

- Old FCV Motto: Virtute et opera (By Virtue and Deeds)
- Old QVR Motto: Semper Paratus (Always Ready)

=== Current dress insignia ===
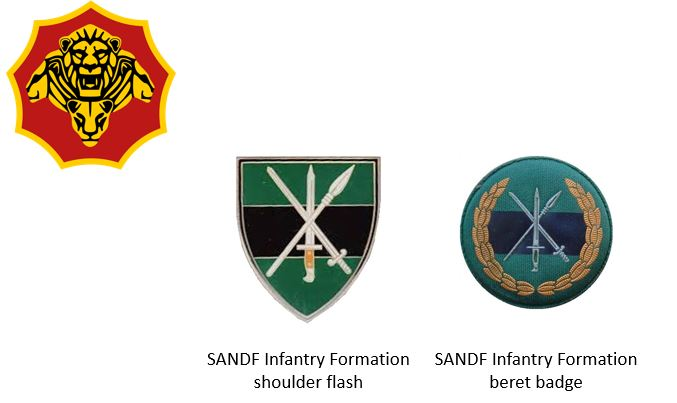
SANDF era Infantry Formation insignia

== Alliances ==
- British: The Bedfordshire and Hertfordshire Regiment (from 1928 to 1958), then renamed The Royal Anglian Regiment (1958 to 1961).

== Battle honours ==
Battle honours
Awarded
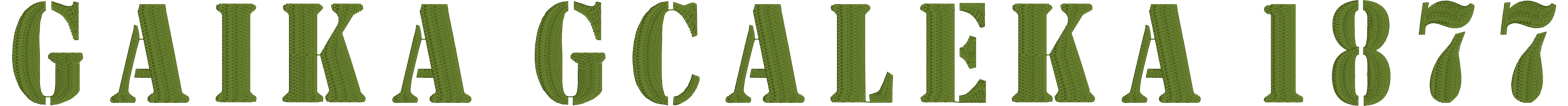
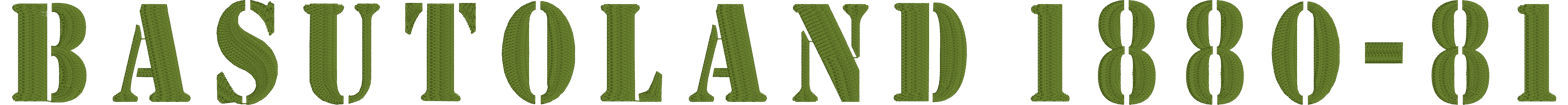
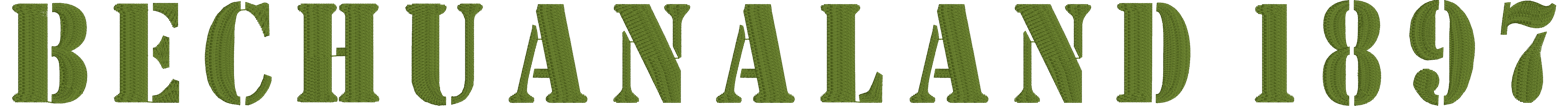
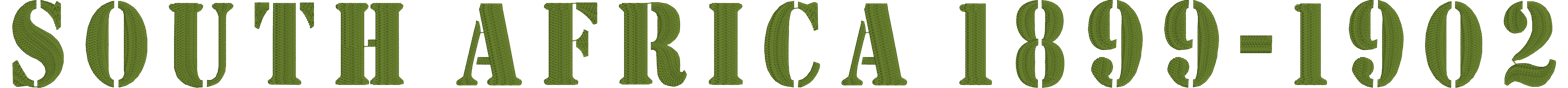
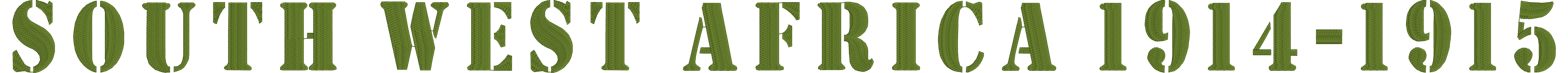
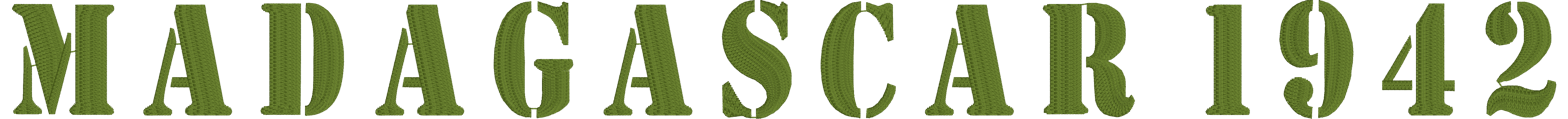
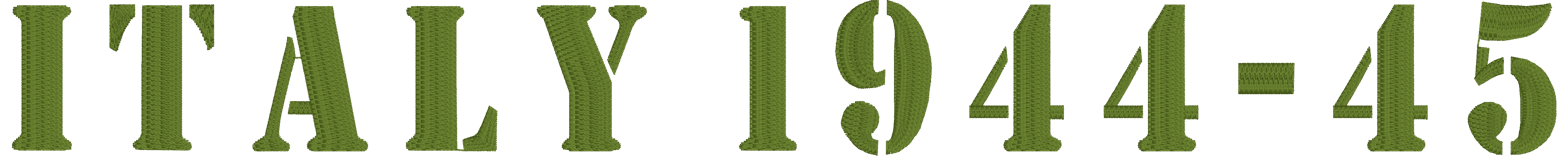
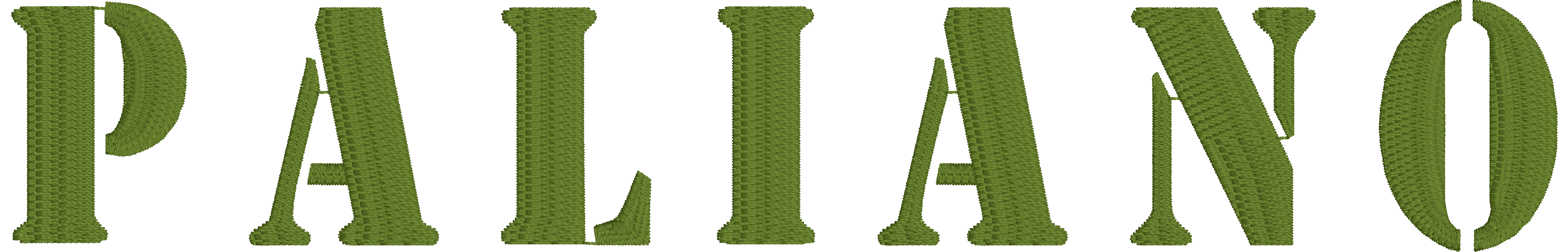
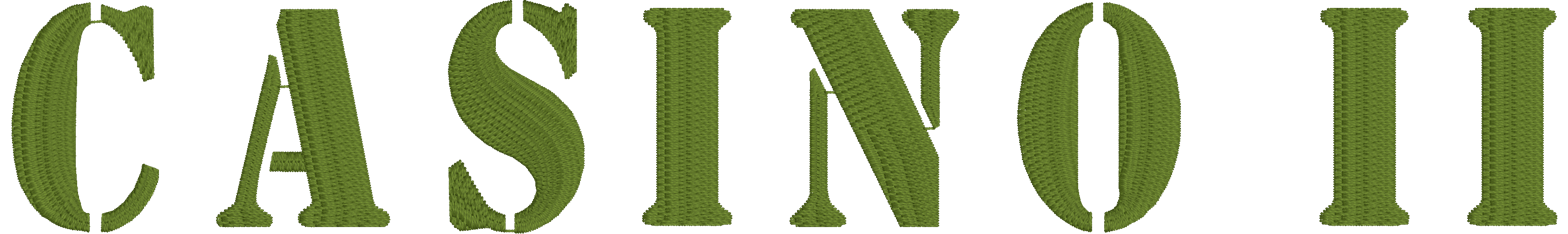
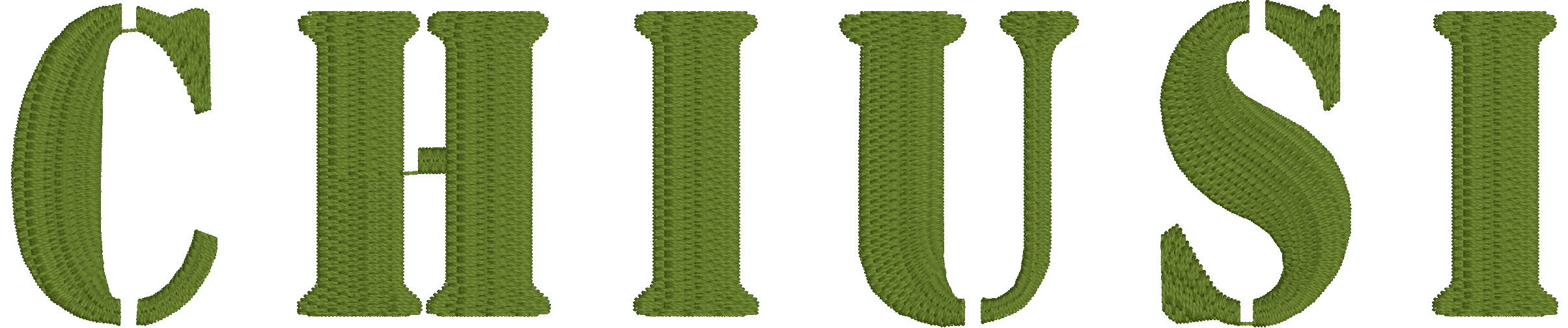
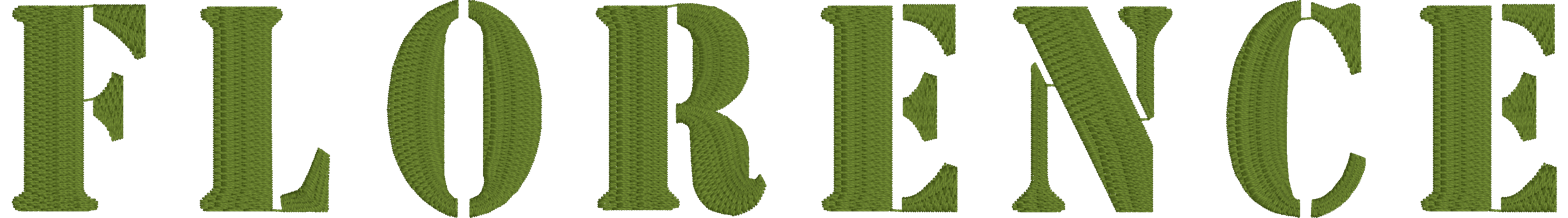
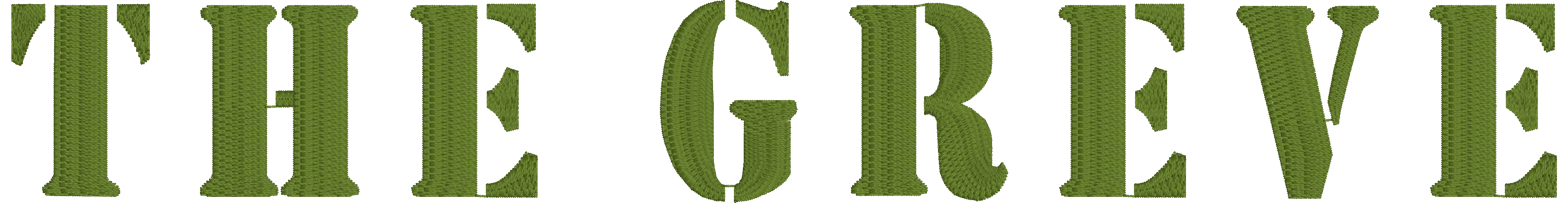
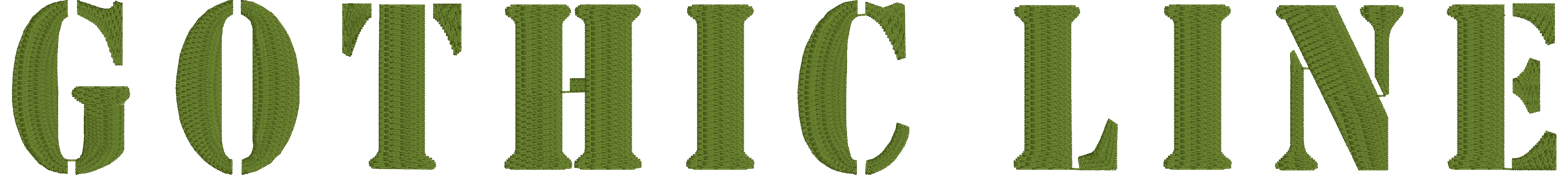
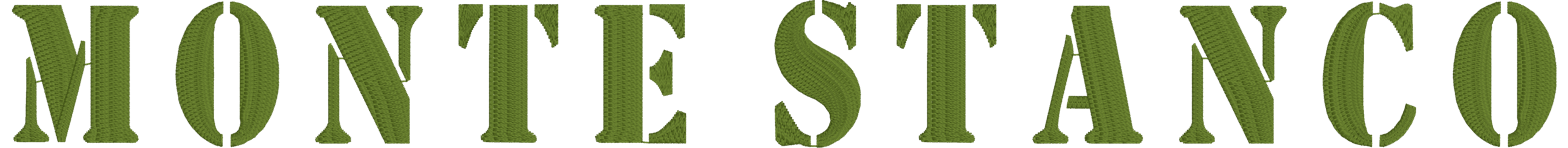
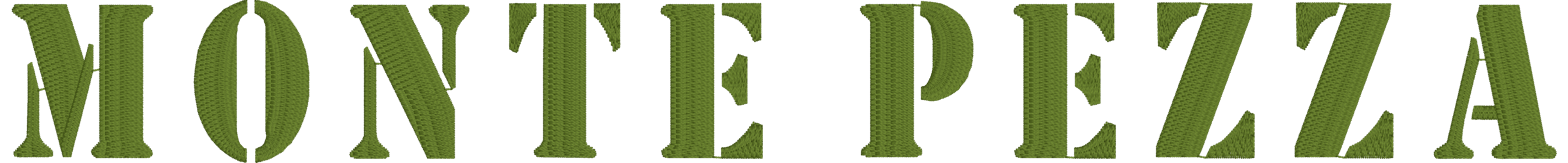
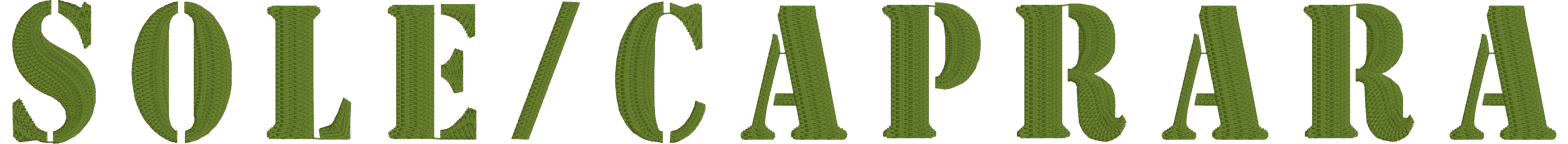
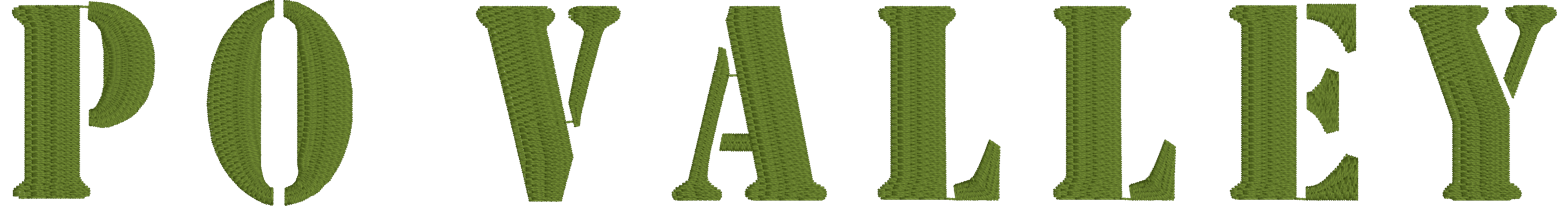
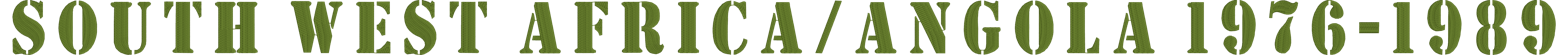

Battle Honours
Outstanding
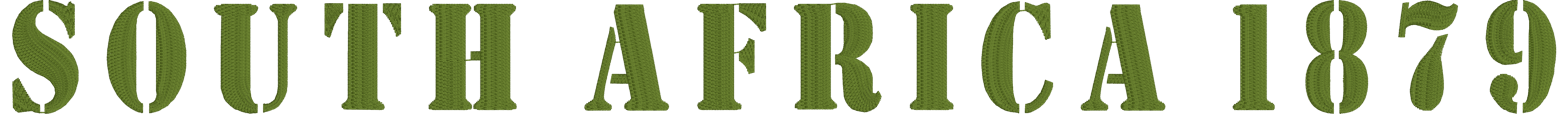

== Leadership ==
Leadership
From	Colonel-in-Chief	To	Ribbon
1935	The Duke of Kent, Maj Gen, Prince George KG,MC,GCVO (Note: The Duke of Kent was killed 25 August 1942 when the aircraft he was on crashed in Scotland enroute to Iceland)	1942	Order of the Garter KG Military Cross MC Royal Victorian Order GCVO
1946	The Duke of Montrose KT,CB,KCVO	1961	Order of the Thistle KT Order of the Bath CB Royal Victorian Order KCVO
From	Honorary Colonel	To	Ribbon
1989	Brigadier General A C Chemaly SM,MMM,JCD	2009	Southern Cross Medal SM Military Merit Medal MMM John Chard Decoration JCD
2009	Col Cecil Peter Jones-Phillipson SM	Present	Southern Cross Medal SM
From	Commanding Officer	To	Ribbon
2017	Maj Robin Collins (Note: Acting (Temporarily holding the post without confirmation))	Present	
From	Regimental Sergeants Major	To	Ribbon
2003	MWO Craig Stuart Brown MMM,JCD	2013	Military Merit Medal MMM John Chard Decoration JCD
