= Lago di Montepulciano =

Lake in Siena, Tuscany, Italy

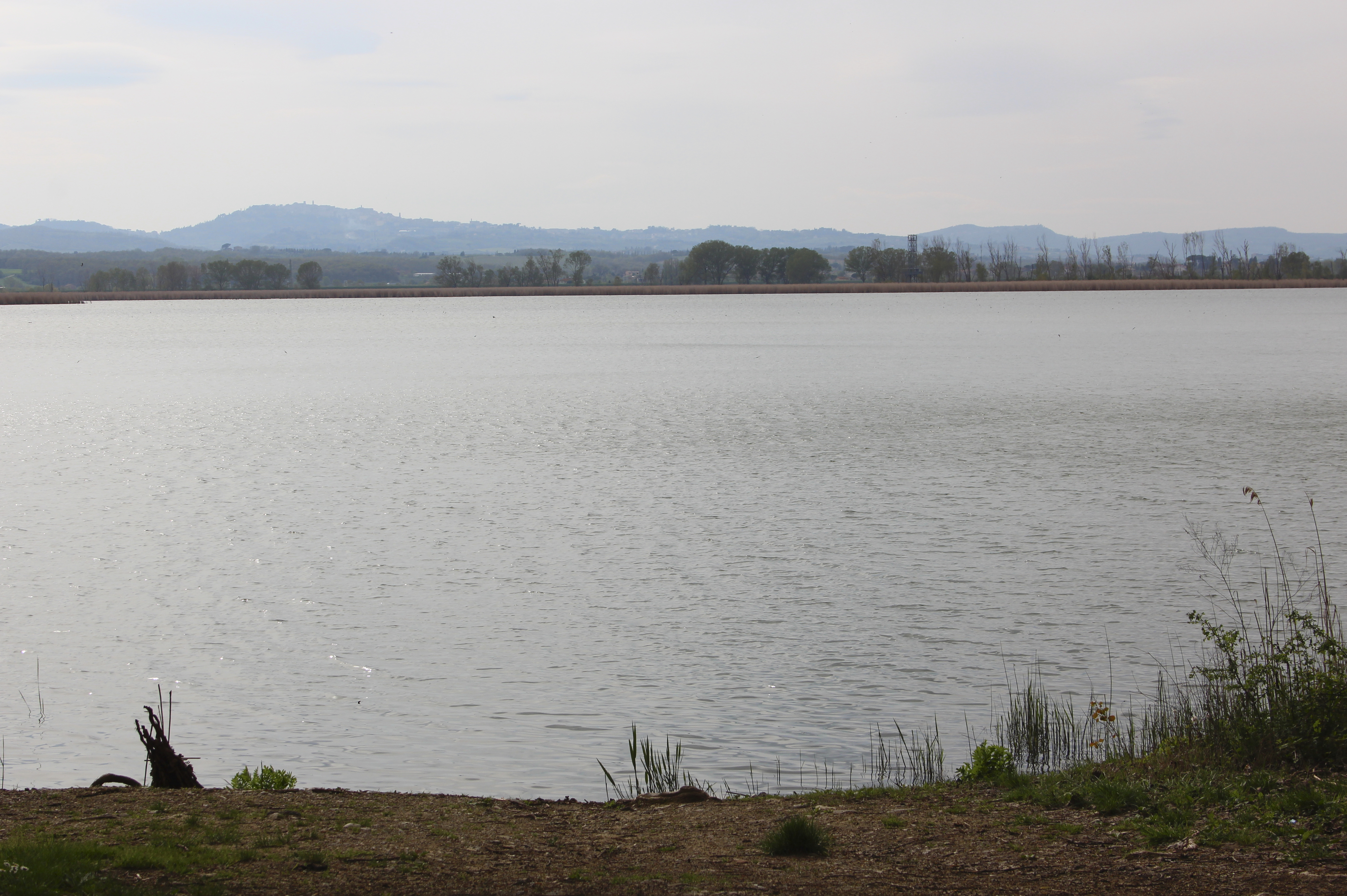

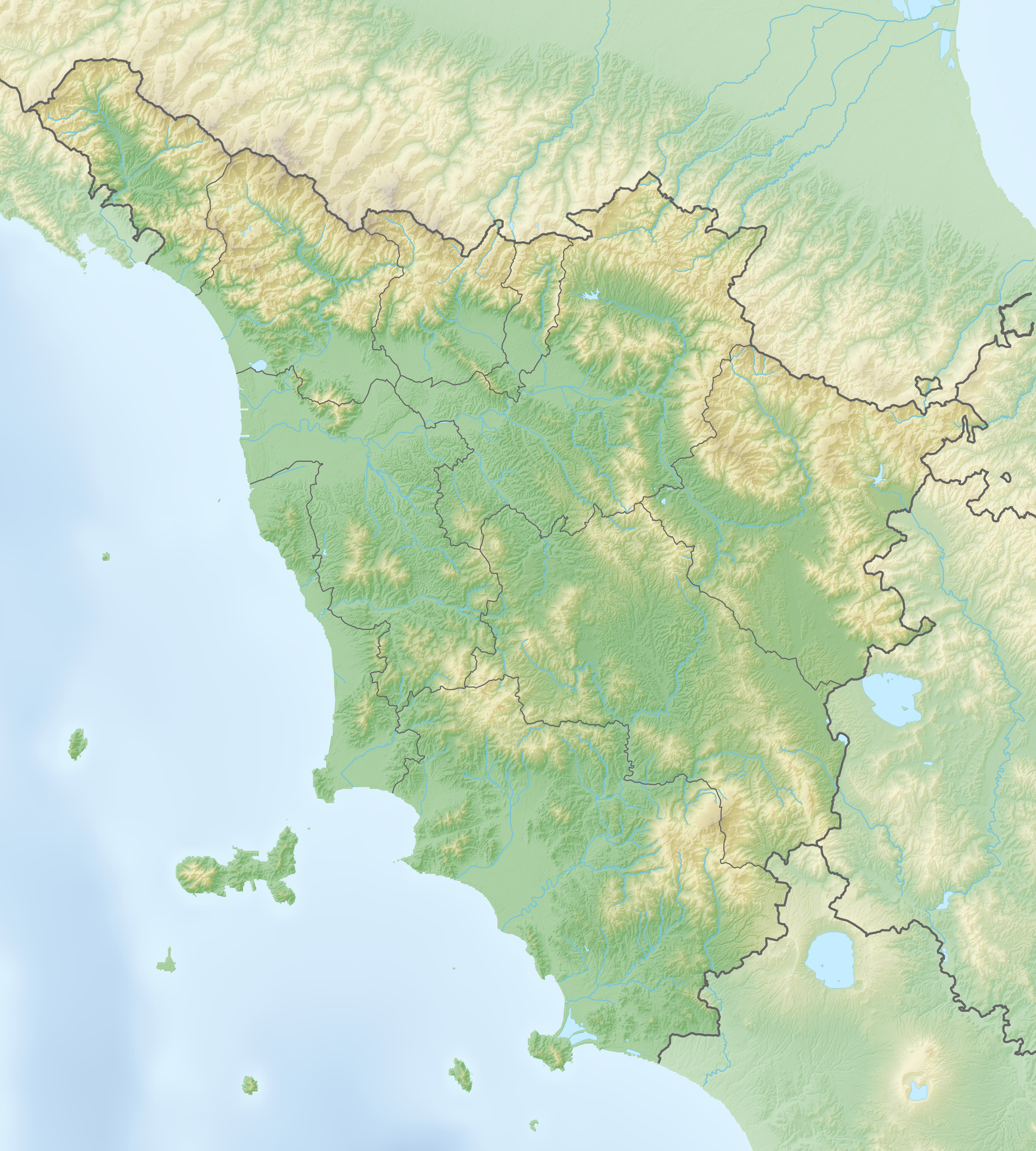
- Location within Tuscany
- Location: Province of Siena, Tuscany
- Coordinates: 43°05′N 11°55′E
- Primary inflows: Canale Maestro della Chiana
- Primary outflows: Canale Maestro della Chiana
- Basin countries: Italy
- Surface area: 1.9 km^{2} (0.73 sq mi)
- Max. depth: 5 m (16 ft)
- Surface elevation: 249 m (817 ft)

Lago di Montepulciano is a lake in the Province of Siena, Tuscany, Italy. At an elevation of 249 m, its surface area is 1.9 km².
