= Regiment Potchefstroom Universiteit =

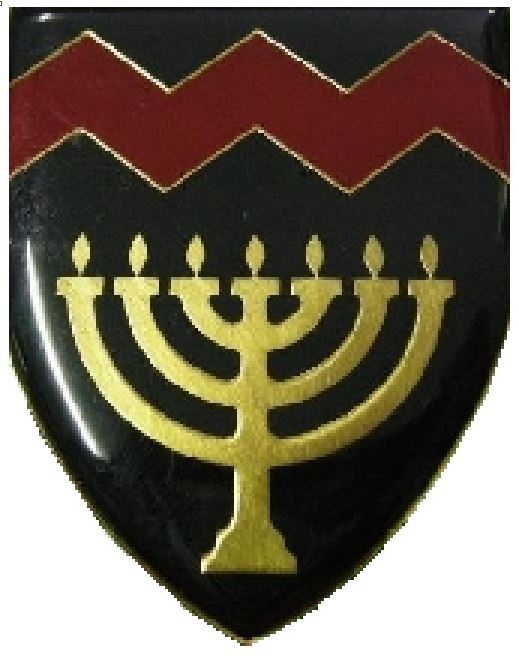
- SANDF Regiment Potchefstroom University emblem
- Active: 1946 to present
- Country: South Africa
- Allegiance: Republic of South Africa; Republic of South Africa
- Branch: South African Army; South African Army
- Type: Reserve Artillery
- Part of: South African Army Artillery Formation; Army Conventional Reserve
- Garrison/HQ: Potchefstroom
- Anniversaries: 1 August 1946

Commanders
- Officer Commanding during Operation Packer: Cmdt C. Hattingh

Insignia
- Collar Badge: Bursting grenade with seven flames
- Beret Colour: Oxford Blue
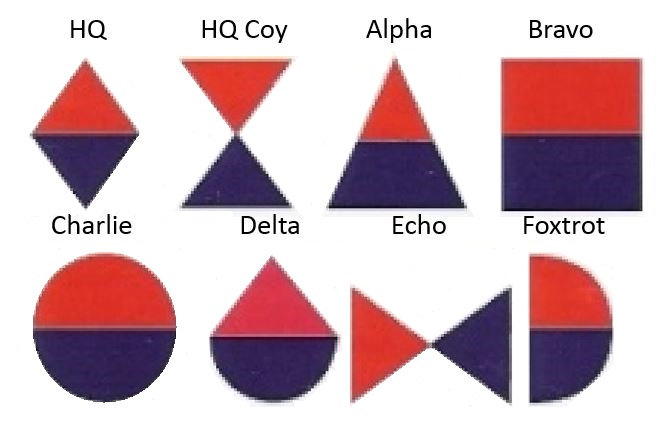
- Artillery Battery Emblems

- Artillery Beret Bar circa 1992

Regiment Potchefstroom Universiteit (Afrikaans for Potchefstroom University Regiment) is an artillery regiment of the South African Army. As a reserve unit, it has a status roughly equivalent to that of a British Army Reserve or United States Army National Guard unit. It is part of the South African Army Artillery Formation.

== History ==
=== 1 Observation Battery ===
The original regiment was formed in 1946, when the South African Army was reorganised for peacetime. It was initially called 1 Observation Battery, and in 1950 it was renamed 1 Observation Regiment.

On being affiliated with the Potchefstroom University in 1960, it was given the name Regiment Potchefstroomse Universiteit.

=== Structure ===
In terms of organisation the regiment was structured with:

- a RHQ and Radar Battery at University of Potchefstroom,
- a Survey Battery at the University of the Orange Free State and
- an Observation and Sound Ranging Battery at the University of Pretoria.

=== Affiliated Division ===
During the bush war the regiment served with:

- 8th South African Armoured Division
- 82 Mechanised Brigade It was mobilised with the brigade in 1988 for Operation Packer and Operation Displace.

and with

- 7 South African Infantry Division

=== Amalgamation with 25 Field Regiment ===
25 Field Regiment was amalgamated with Potchefstroom University (RPU) during September 1991.

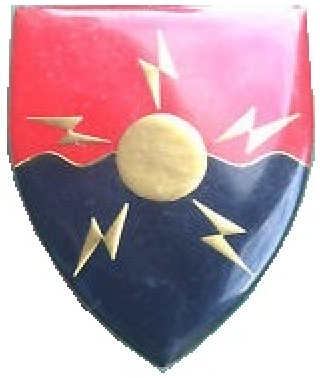
SADF era 25 Field Artillery Regiment badge

== Regimental Emblems ==
=== Insignia ===
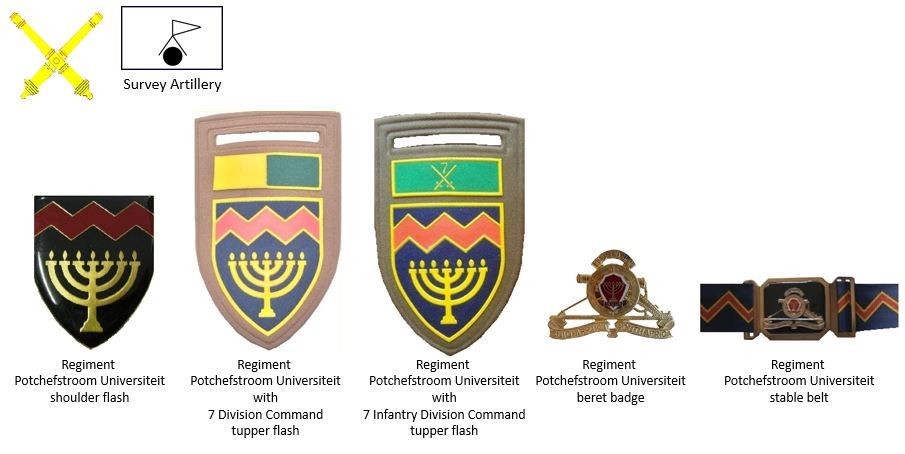
SADF era Regiment Potchefstroom Universiteit insignia
