= 82 Mechanised Brigade (South Africa) =

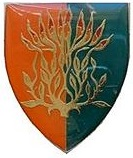
- 82 Mechanised Brigade emblem
- Active: 1974–1992
- Country: South Africa
- Allegiance: South Africa
- Branch: South African Army
- Type: Mechanised Brigade
- Part of: South African Composite Brigade
- Garrison: Potchefstroom
- Nickname: 82 Mech
- Equipment: Ratel; Eland Mk7 90mm and 60mm Armoured Cars; Rooikat; Buffel; G2 howitzer
- Engagements: South African Border War

Insignia
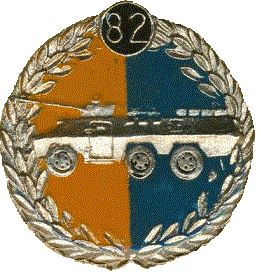
- 82 Mech Brigade Beret Badge

- 82 Mech Command Bar

82 Mechanised Brigade was a Formation of 8th South African Armoured Division, a combined arms force consisting of infantry, armour and artillery.

== History ==
=== Establishment ===
82 Mech was established on 1 August 1974 as part of 8th South African Armoured Division, an armoured formation. By 1977, the Brigade comprised:

- Two Mechanised Infantry Battalions: Regiment de la Rey and Regiment Groot Karoo
- A Tank Regiment: Regiment President Steyn
- A Armoured Car Regiment: Regiment Mooirivier
- A Field Artillery Regiment: Regiment Potchefstroom University
- A Field Engineer Squadron: 13 Field Engineer
- A Signals Units: 82 Signals
- A Maintenance Unit: 3 Maintenance Unit
- A Field Workshop: 71 Field Workshop and
- A Field Ambulance:

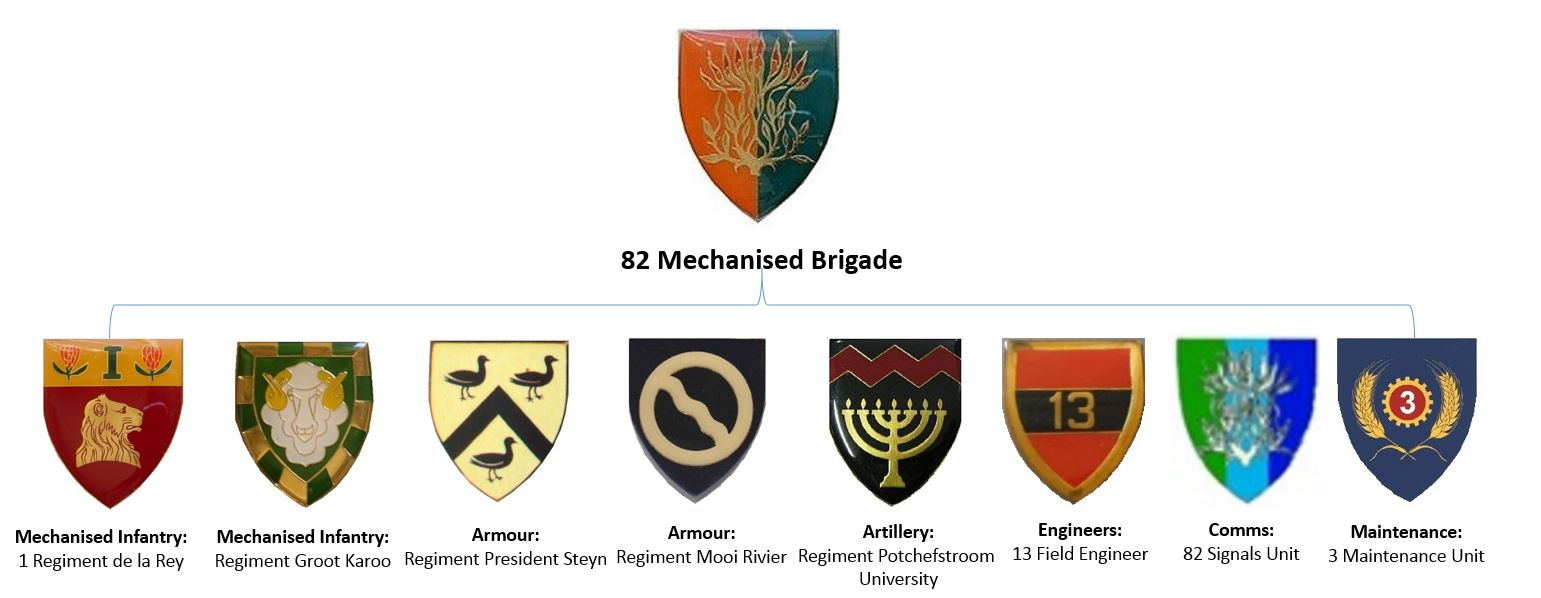
Structure SADF 82 Mechanised Brigade circa 1988

=== Divisional Transfer ===
In 1985, 82 Mechanised Brigade was transferred to 7 Division.

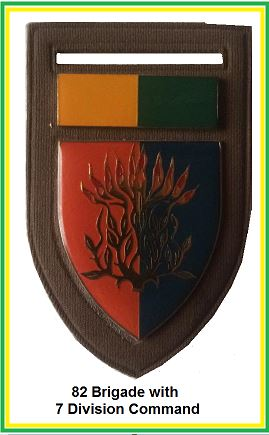
SADF 82 Brigade with 7th Division Command Flash

=== South West Africa and Angola ===
==== Operations ====
As part of 7 Division, 82 Mech was primarily involved in:

- Operation Packer

During Operation Packer which succeeded Operation Hooper in March 1988, 82 Mechanised Brigade protected the eastern bank of the Cuito River. During this operation the FAPLA forces suffered losses and the situation on the eastern bank stabilised to such an extent that Operation Displace could start. During this phase the South African forces withdrew from Angola.

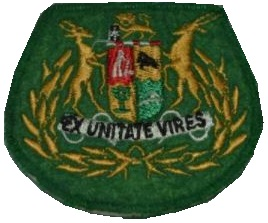
SADF era Brigade level Sergeant Major insignia

=== Disbandment ===
8th South African Armoured Division’s Brigades were disbanded in 1992 and the battalions and regiments came to answer directly to the divisional headquarters - the thinking was that these would be grouped into task forces as required.

== Insignia ==
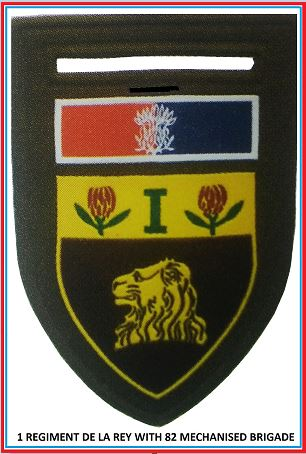
SADF 82 Mechanised Brigade 1 Regiment de la Rey Flash

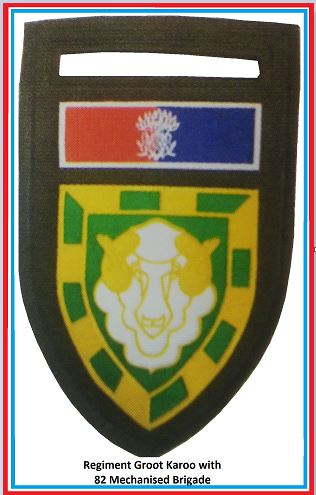
SADF 82 Mechanised Brigade Regiment Groot Karoo Flash

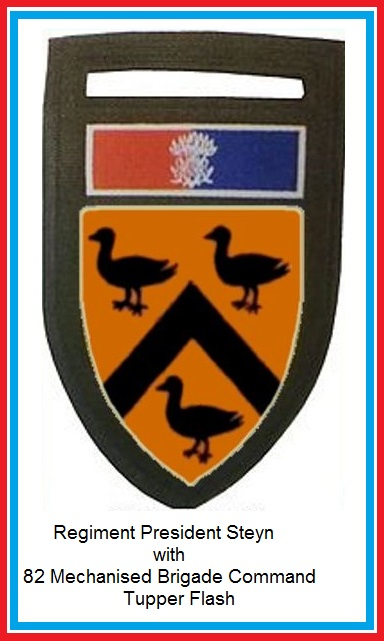
SADF 82 Mechanised Brigade Regiment President Steyn Flash

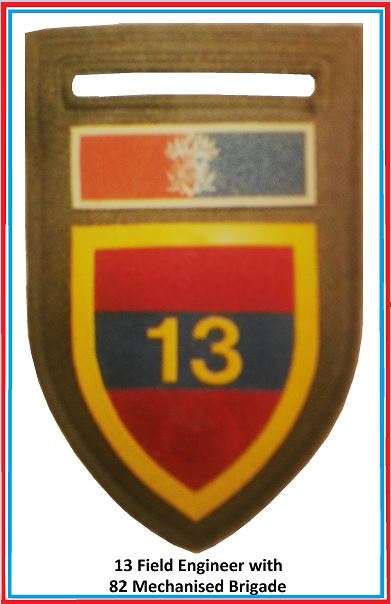
SADF 82 Mechanised Brigade 13 Field Engineer Flash

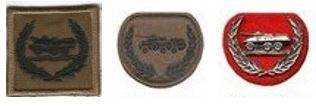
82 Mechanised Brigade Operational Badge, field and office versions

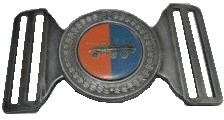
SADF 82 Brigade Stable belt

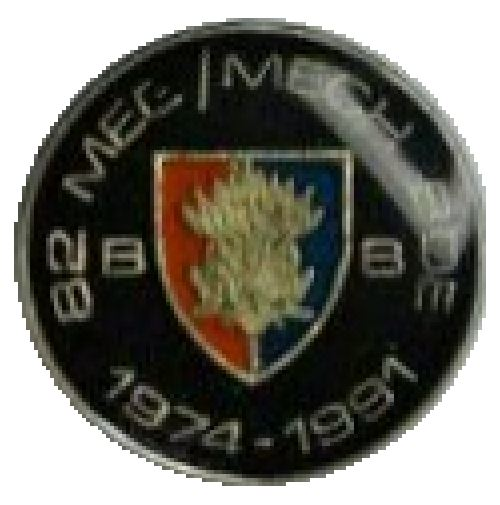
SADF 82 Mechanised Brigade Pin

== Roll of Honour ==
- Fincham, D.R. 1982
- Coleby, D.N. Sgt 1983

== Honoris Crux Recipients ==
- Lewis, M.J. WO, 12 Sept 1990
- Du Plessis, R. S Sgt, 12 Sept 1990

== Leadership ==
Leadership
From	Officer Commanding	To	Ribbon
1983	Col Tobias Johannes Van Schalkwyk	c. nd	
1992	Col Paul Fouche	c. nd	
From	Regimental Sergeant Major	To	Ribbon
	No known incumbents		

== Further developments ==
82 Mech Brigade can be considered the Citizens Force version of 61 Mech, encompassing similar battlegroup or Task Force principles.
