= Operation Packer =

1988 South African operation in Angola

- Part of the Battle of Cuito Cuanavale
- Location: Angola Operation Packer (Angola)
- Objective: Drive the FAPLA/Cubans over to the west side of the Cuito River from their positions east of Cuito Cuanavale on the Chambinga Heights and destroy the bridge.
- Date: 12 March - 30 April 1988
- Outcome: Operational failure by SADF. Strategic stalemate.

Operation Packer was a military operation by the South African Defence Force (SADF) during the South African Border War and Angolan Civil War from March to April 1988. This operation forms part of what became known as the Battle of Cuito Cuanavale. Operation Packer was a continuation of Operation Hooper, using fresh troops and equipment. The Cubans' objective was still to secure the town of Cuito Cuanavale to the west of the river from capture. The SADF objective was once again to eliminate the remaining Angolan forces on the east side of the river, so as to ensure that the Angolans were no longer a threat to UNITA in the south-east. Although at the conclusion some Angolan units remained in positions east of the river, the Angolan advance against UNITA was permanently halted, and UNITA lived to fight on. The SADF never attempted to cross the river or to capture the town. Both sides again claimed victory.

== Background ==
On the 29 February 1988, the SADF and UNITA launched a fourth attack on the 25 Brigade in Tumpo triangle and the vital Cuito River Bridge. This attack would last until the evening of the 1 March. Due to problems with the clearing of the minefields in front of 25 Brigades positions, Cuban artillery and the mechanical failure of several SADF Ratels and Olifant tanks, the SADF could not reach the forward positions on schedule. The Cuban defense plan had worked and the SADF withdrew. By the 3 March, the SADF 20 Brigade, began its planned demobilisation and so ended Operation Hooper. 82 Mechanised Brigade replaced the previous force and consisted mainly of Citizen (reservists) and Permanent Force soldiers.

The battle would take place on the 23 March with a diversionary attack from the south and the main attack of infantry, armour and UNITA from the north.

=== Objectives ===
The plan called for:

- the destruction of the FAPLA Brigade,
- the demolition of the bridge over the Cuito River to the town of Cuito Cuanavale.
- UNITA would then occupy the old 25 Brigade positions and the SADF would then withdraw.

=== Defence strategy ===
The Cubans and FAPLA strengthened the minefields in front of the 25 Brigade and positioned artillery on both sides of the river banks to cover the potential attack routes the SADF might use for their eventual return. 13 Brigade and Cuban soldiers were based on the western side of the Cuito River to guard the town of Cuito Cuanavale.

== Order of battle ==
=== South African and South West Africa Territorial Forces ===
82 Mechanised Brigade - Colonel Paul Fouche

- two Ratel-20 mechanized battalions - Regiment Groot Karoo & Regiment de la Rey
- two Olifant tank squadrons - Regiment President Steyn
- one Ratel-90 anti-tank squadron - Regiment Mooirivier
- one G5 battery - Regiment Potchefstroom University
- one G2 battery - Regiment Potchefstroom University
- one 120 mm mortar battery - 44 Parachute Brigade
- one MRL battery - 19 Rocket Regiment
- AA, engineer and reconnaissance (4 Reconnaissance Regiment) platoons
- three companies - 32 Battalion - Major Tinus van Staden

=== UNITA ===
- 3rd Battalion
- 4th Battalion
- 5th Battalion
- two semi-regular battalions

=== FAPLA/Cuban forces ===
- 25th Brigade
- 13th Brigade
- 36th Brigade (one battalion)
- 29 tanks and numerous artillery units

== Battle ==
After the SADF completed the last attack of Operation Hooper on 1 March, FAPLA and Cuban forces began aggressive patrols around 5 March into the minefields and land in front of their positions in the Tumpo triangle. This brought them into contact with UNITA forces patrolling the disputed land. On 9 March, Cuban MiGs bombed SADF supply lines around the Lomba River. This was the route the SADF used to move their supplies from Mavinga to their positions east of the Chambinga high ground. In preparation for the main attack on the 25 Brigade, UNITA forces attacked and chased the FAPLA elements of 36 Brigade from the high ground north of the Tumpo triangle, between the Cuito and Cuanavale rivers. The positions on the high ground were taken over by 20 March, establishing forward observers for the SADF artillery. Members of 4 Recce infiltrated the west bank of Cuito with the aim of identifying targets for the SADF artillery batteries. The South African artillery engaged many targets before the main battle and the Cuban artillery countered but were not as successful at hitting targets. On 18 March, two portable ferries used to cross the Cuito River were destroyed by the SADF artillery. From 21 to the 22 March, UNITA conducted numerous hit-and-run attacks on FAPLA/Cuban positions around Cuito Cuanavale to confuse and keep them occupied.

SADF electronic warfare operations intercepted FAPLA communications on 22 March which indicated that FAPLA wanted to retake the Chambinga heights. These high grounds lay east in front of the Tumpo triangle and the SADF positions. SADF decided to go ahead with the operation planned for 23 March. On the night of 22 March, around 21h00, the SADF units began to line up and prepare for the attack, which would begin the next morning. As they moved forward during the night, the columns became temporarily lost and then had to continue their advance with only one tank de-miner when the other overturned. Around 04h00 on 23 March, SADF G-5 artillery began to bombard the forward positions of the 25 Brigade. By 06h00 the SADF attack column was within 10 km of the FAPLA positions but had soon stopped as they were delayed by bad terrain and one of the tanks had broken down. Once the repair was completed the attack resumed around 08h15. Not long after the attack column began moving again, a tank hit a mine and the de-miner tank sent forward to clear the minefield was itself permanently disabled by a mine, unable to be moved. The column halted and sappers were brought forward to clear a way through the minefield with their Plofadders, an automated rocket-fired explosive de-miner. They failed to work and they had to be manually detonated, which delayed the operation by three hours. Clearing of the minefields also attracted the attention of the Cuban artillery, which fired on the SADF column but was ineffective in hitting targets but slowed any progress they wished to make. During this time, UNITA fought a battle with elements of 38 Brigade on the high ground they captured earlier during the month, but they and the SADF forward observers were chased off it.

The SADF's main column resumed moving around 12h30 towards 25 Brigade's positions, but just over an hour later hit another minefield. This disabled three SADF tanks and again attracted the Cuban artillery. One of the tanks was able to be recovered while the other two remained stuck in the minefield. UNITA soldiers started to take casualties as they were being transported on the backs of the tanks and were exposed to this artillery fire. The South African commander moved his forces back out of the minefield as they attempted to retrieve the damaged tanks. By 14h30 a decision was made to withdraw altogether due to the minefields and heavy artillery attacks from both sides of the river. A request was made for the SADF artillery to destroy the three damaged Olifant tanks. This was rejected as it was believed that the tanks could be recovered. This did not happen; one was retrieved by the Cubans and taken to the town of Cuito Cunivale and the other two remain to this day in the Angolan bush.

== Aftermath ==
It was soon realized that the SADF and UNITA would not be able to push the FAPLA/Cuban forces out of their Tumpo positions without taking serious casualties. The South African government had also ruled out an attack on Cuito Cuanavale from the west. Operation Packer thus came to an end on the 30 April 1988. 82 Brigade began to withdraw and was replaced with Battle Group 20.

The new battle group's objective was, with aid from UNITA,:

- to build minefields between the Tumpo and Dala Rivers and mine other exits across the Cuito River,
- to prevent a further Angolan assault from Cuito Cuanavale towards Mavinga and
- to create the impression that the SADF were still entrenched in the area. This operation would take several months, and was part of Operation Displace.

=== Stalemate ===
The Cubans saw the failure of the SADF and UNITA to drive the Angolans from their positions as a defeat but in reality both sides had fought themselves to a stalemate. The Cubans and FAPLA were effectively in control of the same territory when the offensive first started in 1985, three years earlier. However the FAPLA attack against UNITA had been permanently halted, and the SADF strategic objectives had been accomplished.

=== New battlefields ===
Direct action between the South Africans and Cubans would soon move to south-western Angola where a confrontation between the parties would result in Operation Excite/Hilti.

== Battle of Cuito Cuanavale? ==
There was no actual battle at Cuito Cuanavale itself. The SADF never launched a major attack on the town, and the Cuban defenders never attempted to counter-attack and drive the SADF away from the town. The Cubans did however succeed in establishing air superiority over the area with their new Russian aircraft, and the defenders did manage to hold onto a bridgehead east of the town, with the aid of extensive minefields.
