= GDLR =

GDLR may refer to:

- Galería de la Raza, an art gallery in San Francisco, California
- General de la Rey Regiment, an infantry regiment of the South African Army
- Grimsby District Light Railway
