= General de la Rey Regiment =

Regiment de la Rey General de la Rey Regiment
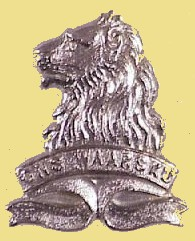
- SANDF Regimental de la Rey emblem
- Active: 1934 – present
- Country: South Africa
- Allegiance: Allied forces; South Africa; South Africa
- Branch: South African Army; South African Army
- Type: Mechanised Infantry
- Size: Battalion
- Part of: South African Infantry Formation; Army Conventional Reserve
- Motto: "Ons Waarsku" (We warn)
- Engagements: Italian campaign

Insignia
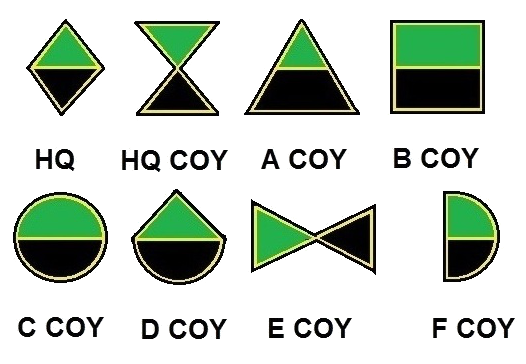
- Company level Insignia

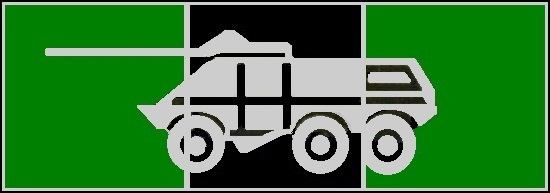
- SA Mechanised Infantry beret bar c. 1992: SA mechanised infantry beret bar c. 1992
- Abbreviation: GDLR

The General de la Rey Regiment (formerly Regiment de la Rey) is a reserve infantry regiment of the South African Army.

== Formation ==
The Regiment de la Rey was established in 1934 as one of the new Afrikaans language Citizen Force units of the Union Defence Force.

The regimental badge depicts a lion's head, in memory of Boer General JH de la Rey, the Lion of the West after whom the regiment is named.

Before the Second World War, battalion headquarters were at Rustenburg in the Transvaal. The unit had company headquarters at Potchefstroom, Klerksdorp and Ventersdorp, with a support company at Brits.

Mrs J E Morkel, daughter of General De la Rey, became the first honorary colonel of the regiment.

The regiment was affiliated to the Northamptonshire Regiment of the British Army.

== World War II ==
RDLR was called up for full-time service on 18 July 1940. Because the commanding officer, Lt-Col (later Brig) H P van Noorden, was by then commanding a battalion of the Field Force Brigade, command of the regiment passed to Lt-Col WD Basson.

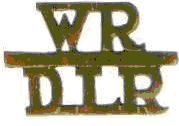
Badge worn by Wits-delaRey battalion after amalgamation.

The regiment was amalgamated with the Witwatersrand Rifles Regiment. After training in Egypt, the new unit, Wits-delaRey (WR/DLR) made a name for itself as one of the motorised infantry battalions of the 12th Motorised Brigade in the 6th South African Armoured Division in Italy in 1944–45.

For almost the entire Italian campaign RDLR was commanded by Lt-Col Jack Bester, until he was appointed to command the newly formed 13th Motorised Brigade.

The regiment distinguished itself particularly in taking Allerona on 15 June 1944, in fighting on Monte Querciabella and Monte Fili, and in forcing the River Greve in July 1944.

WR/DLR were the first on Monte Stanco in the Apennines in October 1944 and scored a spectacular success in the final offensive in Italy when they took Monte Caprara on 16 April 1945.

The unit's casualties were among the heaviest in the division. During the Italian campaign 119 soldiers were killed, 576 wounded and 17 were posted missing in action.

On 1 January 1960 the regiment was renamed Regiment Wes-Transvaal with headquarters at Potchefstroom. After objections and strenuous efforts it resumed its original designation as Regiment De la Rey on 1 September 1966.

== The Border War ==
The regiment participated in the South African Border War, also known as the Namibian War of Independence, the conflict that took place from 1966 to 1989 in South-West Africa (now Namibia) and Angola between South Africa and its allied forces (mainly UNITA) and the Angolan government, South-West Africa People's Organisation (SWAPO), and their allies the Soviet Union and Cuba.

=== Operation Packer ===
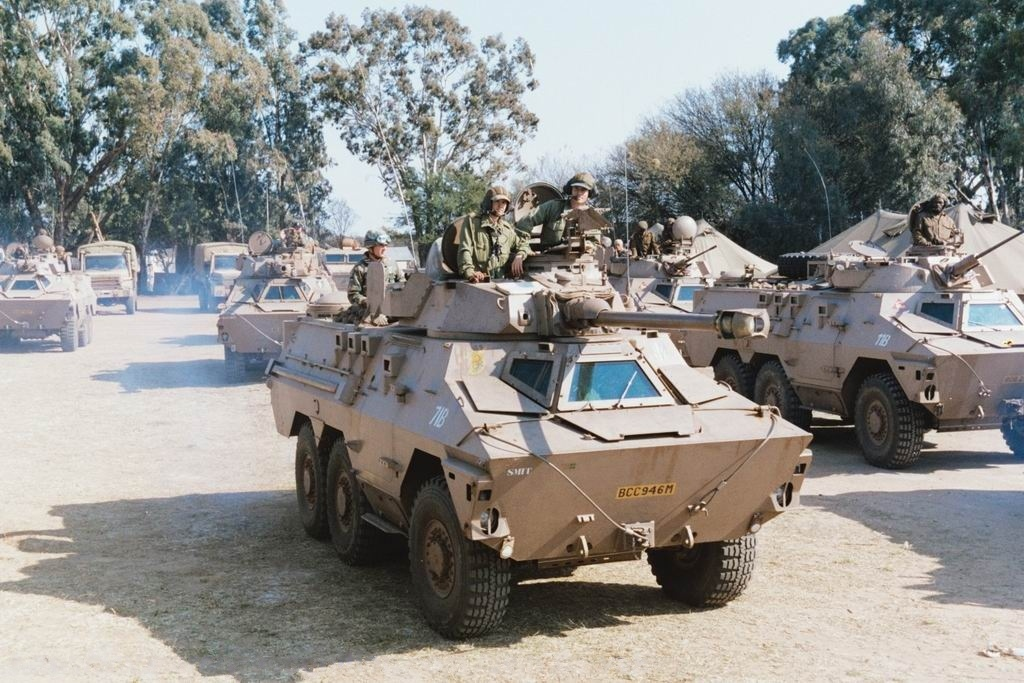
Ratel 90 with Ratel 20 on the right, in a 2003 exercise in Lohatla

Operation Hooper, in which the main participants were Permanent Force and National Service members, officially ended on 13 March 1988. A Citizen Force call up provided fresh troops into the SADF-UNITA force which had been tasked to drive People's Armed Forces for the Liberation of Angola (FAPLA) forces from Cuito Cuanavale. This injection of fresh troops allowed Operation Hooper to move seamlessly into Operation Packer. The objective of the operation was to drive the combined FAPLA/Cuban force back across the Cuito River to the west bank.

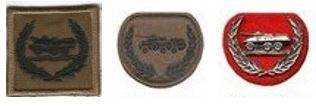
82 Mechanised Brigade Operational Badge field and office versions, of which this Regiment was part

The primary assault force which was to 'drive the enemy' out of Tumpo consisted of 13 Olifant tanks with crews from Regiment President Steyn, a squadron of Ratel 90's from Regiment Mooirivier (RMR), a mechanised infantry battalion from Regiment de la Rey and from Regiment Groot Karoo, three companies from 32 Battalion, three UNITA regular battalions and two semi-regular UNITA battalions plus a number of other components.

== Post-1994 ==
The regiment is one of only six mechanised units in the SANDF Reserve Force.

1 RDLR took part in the 50th anniversary parade of Regiment Mooirivier in Potchefstroom on 23 July 2004.

=== External deployment ===
2 South African Infantry Battalion, situated in Zeerust, deployed to the Democratic Republic of the Congo (DRC) from October 2005 to May 2006. A full company of 1 Regiment De La Rey (1RDLR) deployed with them. one mortar platoon 1RDLR – under Lt Col B. Schoeman.

=== Name Change ===
In August 2019, 52 Reserve Force units had their names changed to reflect the diverse military history of South Africa. Regiment de la Rey became the General de la Rey Regiment, and have 3 years to design and implement new regimental insignia.

== Battle honours ==
Italy 1944–45, Cassino II, Allerona, Florence, Monte Querciabella, Monte Fili, The Greve, Gothic Line, Monte Stanco, Monte Salvaro, Sole/Caprara, Po Valley, Campo Santo Bridge

Battle Honours
Awarded to General de la Rey Regiment
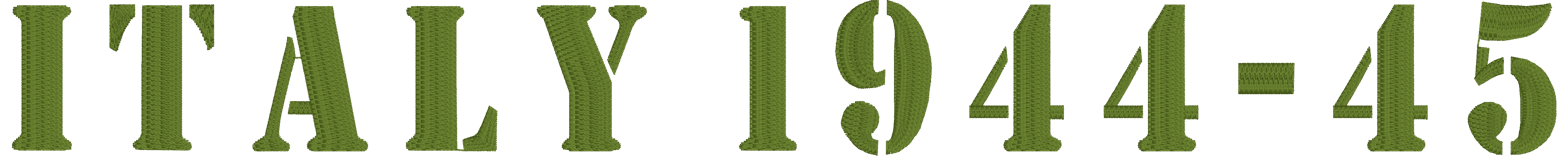
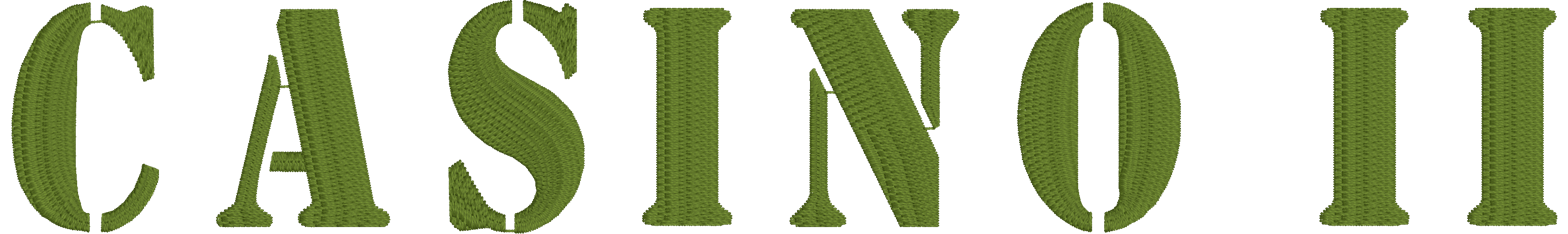
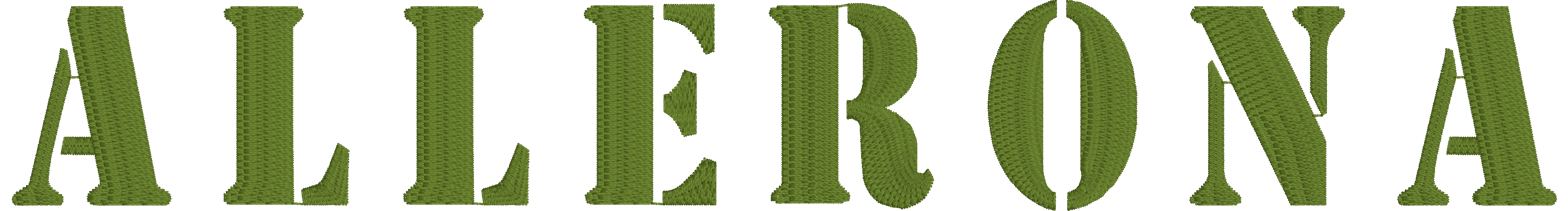
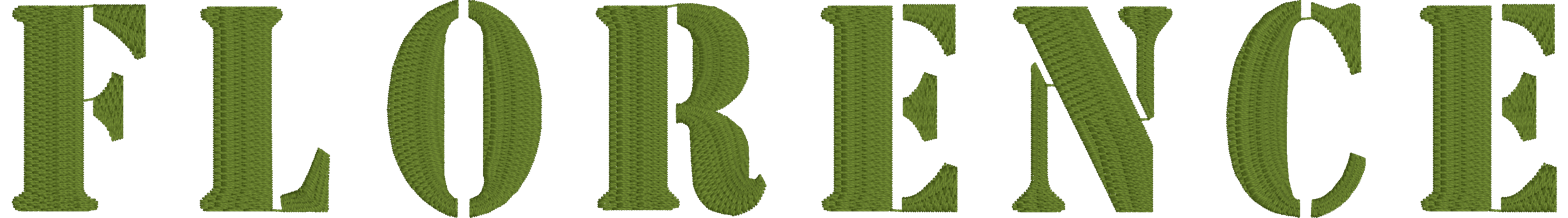
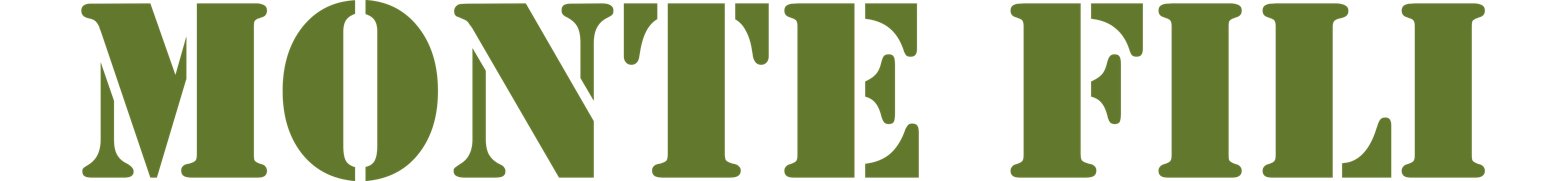
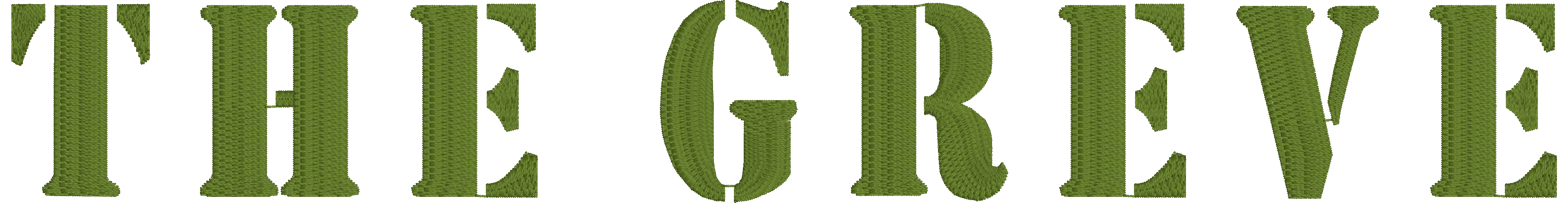
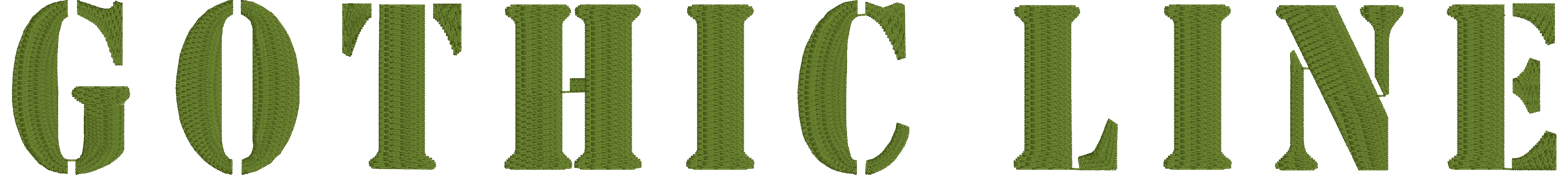
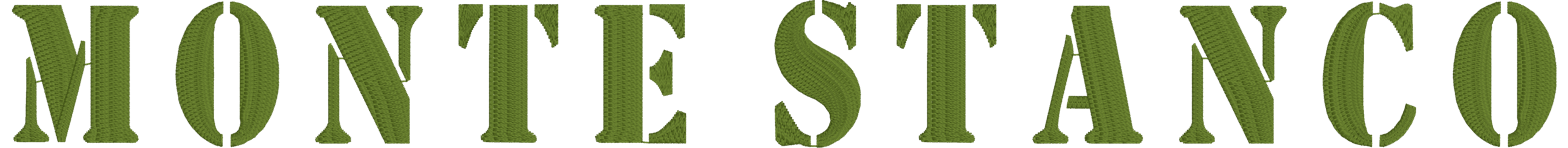
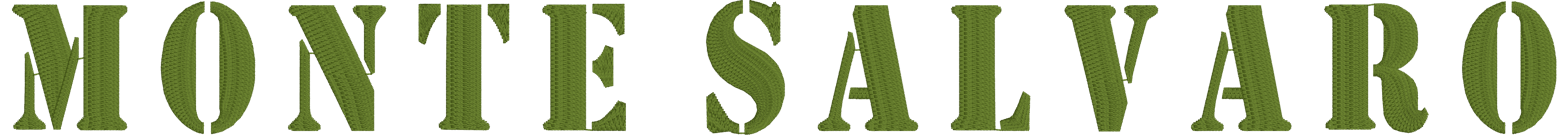
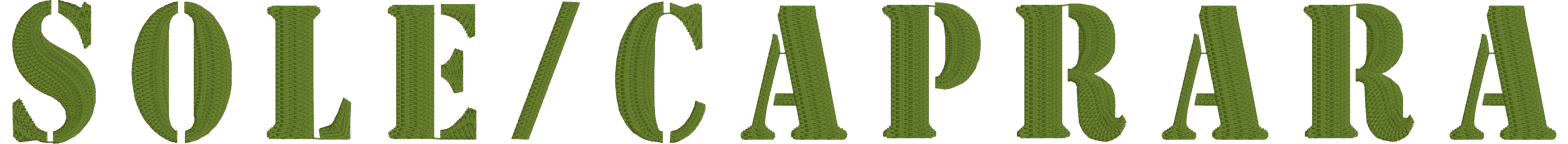
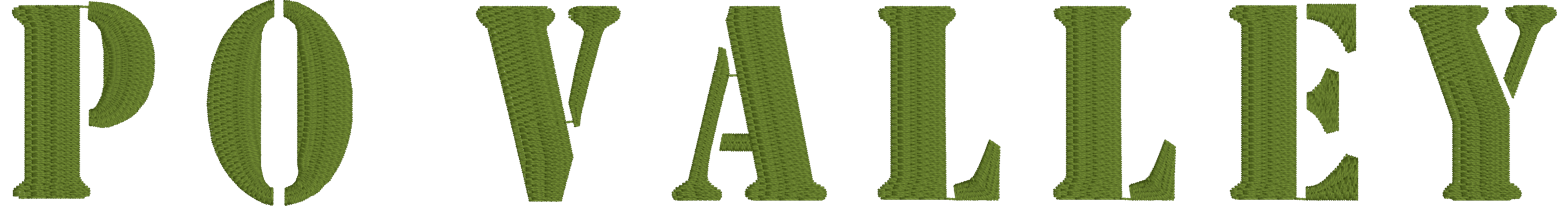

== Leadership ==
=== 1st Battalion ===
Leadership
From	Honorary Colonels	To	Ribbon
1934	Mrs J E Morkel	nd	
From	Commanding Officers	To	Ribbon
nd	Lt -Col H P van Noorden (Note: later Brigadier (General))	nd	
nd	Lt -Col WD Basson	nd	
nd	Lt -Col Jack Bester	nd	
nd	Lt Col "Boet" Schoeman	nd	
From	Regimental Sergeants Major	To	Ribbon
	No known incumbents		

=== 2nd Battalion ===
Leadership
From	Honorary Colonel	To	Ribbon
	No known incumbents		
From	Officer Commanding	To	Ribbon
	No known incumbents		
From	Regimental Sergeants Major	To	Ribbon
	No known incumbents		

== Insignia ==
=== Previous Dress Insignia ===
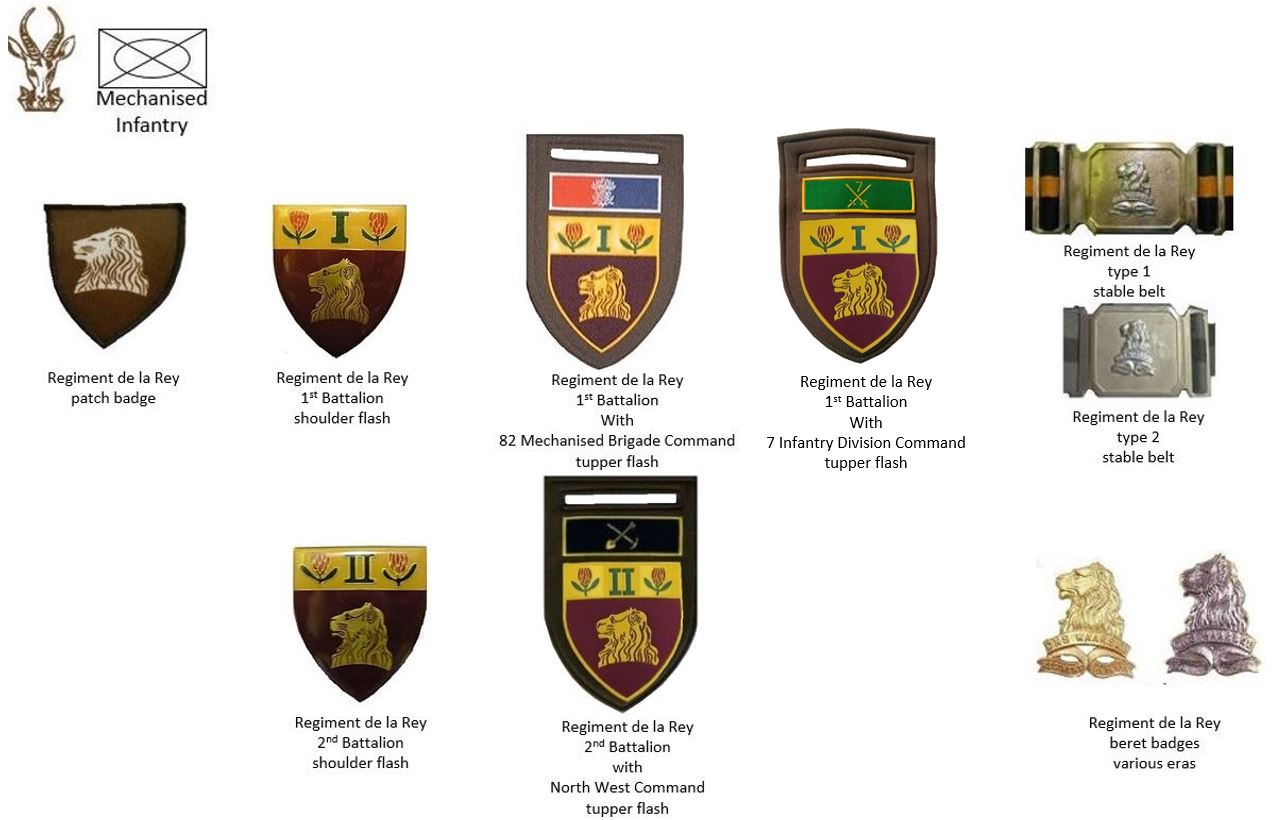
SADF era Regiment de la Rey insignia

=== Current Dress Insignia ===
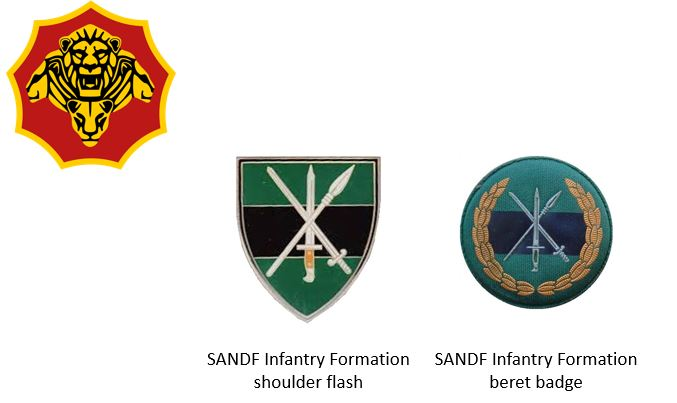
SANDF era Infantry Formation insignia
