= Operation Displace =

1988 South African operation in Angola

- Part of the South African Border War
- Location: Angola Operation Displace (Angola)
- Objective: Maintain a force east of Cuito Cuanavale and the withdrawal of SADF soldiers from Southern Angola.
- Date: 30 April – 30 August 1988

Operation Displace was a military operation by the South African Defence Force during the South African Border War and Angolan Civil War. It involved maintaining the illusion that the SADF had remained in brigade strength east of Cuito Cuanavale at the end of April 1988 and the eventual withdrawal of all South African military units from south-eastern Angola during August 1988.

== Background ==
Following the end of fighting on 27 June 1988 around Techipa and Calueque, also known as Operation Excite/Hilti, an undeclared ceasefire came into being. The Americans under Chester Crocker, eager to prevent further fighting, negotiated a third round of talks in New York City to begin on 10 July. With Soviet assistance, the Cuban delegation returned with a less belligerent leader who proposed to the South Africans a Cuban withdrawal linked with the implementation of UN Resolution 435. This new concession came after seven years of rejecting that position. The talks ended on 13 July 1988, resulting in a document called the New York Principles which set out the negotiating points for future rounds. These included implementation of UN Resolution 435, SWA/Namibian independence and the Cuban withdrawal from Angola.

The fourth round of talks began on 22 July 1988 in Sal, Cape Verde. It lasted two days with the talks centring on the size and location of the military forces in Angola. Nothing more was achieved except a commitment to set up a Joint Monitoring Commission when the South Africans and Cubans decide to withdraw.

Round five began on 2 August 1988 in Geneva, Switzerland. The Soviets joined the meeting in an observer role. The South Africans opened the negotiations with several proposals: a ceasefire to begin on 10 August 1988, redeployment of South African and Cuban forces in Angola by 1 September 1988, implementation of UN Resolution 435 and all foreign forces leave Angola by 1 June 1989. The 1 June 1989 proposal angered the Cuban and Angolans and the talks continued discussing the first three South African proposals. With the assistance of the Soviets, the American were able to get the Cubans, Angolans and South Africans to sign the Geneva Protocol on 5 August 1988. The protocol set the following dates:

- 10 August 1988 – South Africans to begin withdrawal from Angola
- 1 September 1988 – South Africans complete the withdrawal
- 10 September 1988 – Peace settlement signed
- 1 November 1988 – Implementation of UN Resolution 435

What was not agreed upon was Cuban withdrawal from Angola. This would be negotiated at another meeting in the near future. Nor were SWAPO or UNITA party to the agreement.

== Order of battle ==
=== South African and South West Africa Territorial Forces ===
Combat Group 20 – Commandant Piet Nel

- one company – 101 Battalion
- one anti tank squadron – 32 Battalion
- one G-5 battery
- one MRL Valkiri battery
- two Combat Engineer troops

== Operation ==
By the end of March 1988, it was soon realized that the SADF and UNITA would not be able to push the FAPLA/Cuban forces out of their Tumpo positions without taking serious casualties.The South African government had also ruled out an attack on Cuito Cuanavale from the west. Operation Packer thus came to an end on 30 April 1988.

82 Mechanised Brigade began to withdraw and was replaced with Battle Group 20. This battle group's objective was, with aid from UNITA, to build minefields between the Tumpo and Dala Rivers and mine other exits across the Cuito River, to prevent a further Angolan assault from Cuito Cuanavale towards Mavinga and to create the impression that the SADF were still entrenched in the area. This operation would take several months.

After the battle at Techipa on 27 June and the subsequent South African publics uproar over the deaths of the twelve SADF soldiers on the same day, the SA government decided to scale back operations in southern Angola and an undeclared ceasefire came into being. SADF soldiers in southwestern Angola were moved back to Calueque and Ruacana with some movement back into SWA/Namibia while in southeastern Angola, Battle Group 20, which was helping to maintain the siege of Cuito Cuanavale with UNITA, was ordered to maintain a position by which no more casualties or loss of equipment could be sustained.

Meanwhile, 10 SA Division was formed on the SWA/Namibia border with Angola which would defend against any potential Cuban invasion of South West Africa. This force stayed in position until the end of the year.

=== Ceasefire ===
On 8 August, the South Africans, Angolans and Cubans announced a ceasefire in Angola and SWA/Namibia. A line was drawn from Chitado, Ruacana, Calueque, Naulili, Cuamato and Chitado that the Cubans would stay north of and would guarantee the water irrigation supply from Ruacana to SWA/Namibia. SWAPO, not party to the agreement, said it would honour the ceasefire on 1 September if South Africa did so, but this did not happen and SWAPO activities continued. UNITA on the other hand stated that it would ignore the ceasefire and would continue to fight the Angolan government. It did however state that it wished to stop fighting if the Angolan government held talks with them or ceased attacking them and seek national reconciliation.

10 August saw the South African government announce the beginnings of a troop withdrawal from southern Angola, with the final day for withdrawal of SADF personnel set for 1 September. When the Battle Group 20 commander notified the UNITA commander that they had been ordered southwards, the commander sought clarification from his headquarters. It is said that some of the UNITA soldiers cried as the SADF left their positions southeast of Cuito Cuanavale and believed they had been betrayed. The SADF elements arrived at the Angolan/SWA/Namibian border with ten days to spare and had to wait around as the Joint Monitoring Commission and world media organised themselves for the crossover at Rundu at a temporary steel bridge that was to take place on 1 September.

=== Joint Monitoring Commission ===
By 16 August the Joint Monitoring Commission was formed. This Joint Monitoring Commission met on 22 August at Ruacana and the formal ceasefire was signed between three parties. On 30 August 1988, the last of the South African troops crossed the temporary steel bridge into SWA/Namibia watched by the world's media and the Joint Monitoring Commission, 36 hours early than the planned time. A convoy of fifty vehicles with around thousand soldiers crossed over singing battle songs. After officers of the three countries walked across the bridge, the South African sappers begun to dismantle the temporary steel bridge.

== Aftermath ==
The Joint Monitoring Commission then declared on 30 August 1988, that the South African Defence Force had now left Angola.What followed were nine more rounds of negotiations revolving around the dates for the Cuban withdrawal from Angola that finally ended with an agreement called the Tripartite Accord signed on 22 December in New York. This accord finalised the dates of the Cuban staggered withdrawals from Angola and the implementation of UN Resolution 435 on 1 April 1989.

== See also ==
- Tripartite Accord (Angola)
