= Molapo Armoured Regiment =

2 Anti Tank Regiment Regiment Hendrik Potgieter Regiment Mooirivier Molapo Armour Regiment
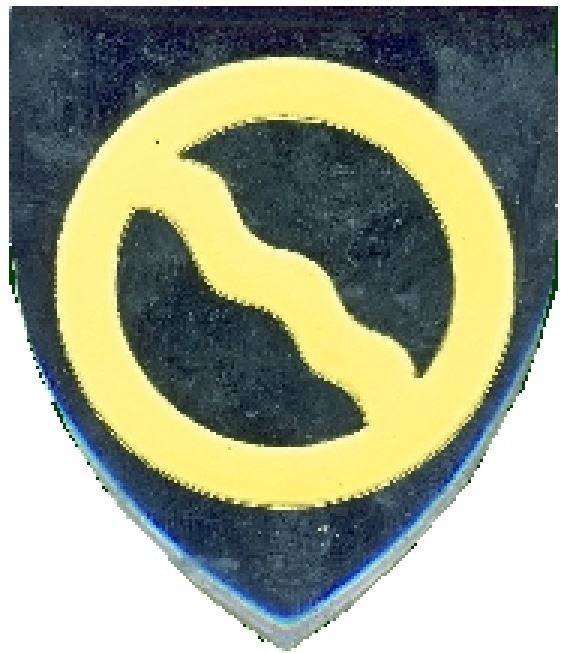
- SANDF Regiment Mooi River emblem
- Active: 1941 to present
- Country: South Africa
- Allegiance: Republic of South Africa; Republic of South Africa
- Branch: South African Army; South African Army
- Type: Armoured Car Regiment
- Size: One Battalion
- Part of: South African Armour Formation; Army Conventional Reserve
- Garrison/HQ: Potchefstroom
- Mottos: Semper Prorsum; Ever Forward
- Equipment: Eland 90, Rooikat armoured fighting vehicle

Insignia
- Beret Colour: Black
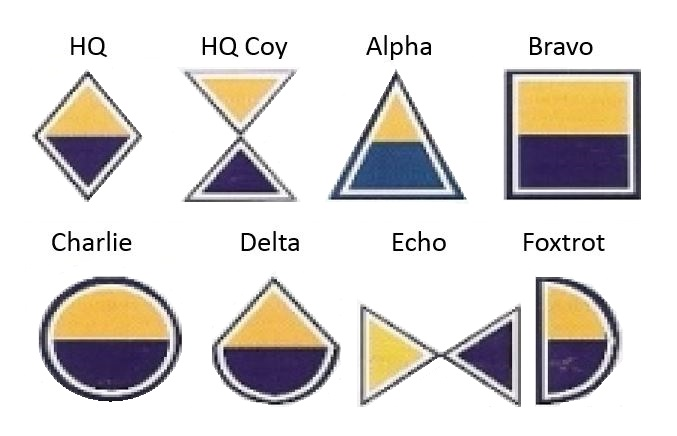
- Armour Squadron emblems

- Armour beret bar circa 1992
- Abbreviation: MAR

The Molapo Armour Regiment (formerly Regiment Mooirivier) is a reserve armoured regiment of the South African Army.

== History ==
=== Origin ===
The regiment was founded in 1941 as 2 Anti Tank Regiment and re-instituted in 1954 by the first vice-rector of the Potchefstroom University, Professor Fanus du Plessis.

During 1955 the regiment was converted to an armoured car regiment and renamed Regiment Hendrik Potgieter. In 1959 the Regiment was renamed Regiment Mooirivier.

=== Under the SADF ===
This unit served in South Africa's various internal conflicts as well as during the South African Border War, including duty in South-West Africa and cross-border raids into Angola between 1975 and 1984. The regiment participated in Operations Askari, Modular, Hooper and Packer. The regiment was equipped with Eland 90s at that stage.

==== Divisional affiliation ====
- 8th South African Armoured Division
  - 82 Mechanised Brigade

=== Under the SANDF ===
82 Mechanised Brigade Division was disbanded, and Regiment Mooirivier was transferred to the new armoured 'type' formation, the South African Army Armoured Formation.

==== Current equipment ====
The Regiment currently uses the Rooikat armoured fighting vehicle, equipped with a 76 mm quick-fire gun.

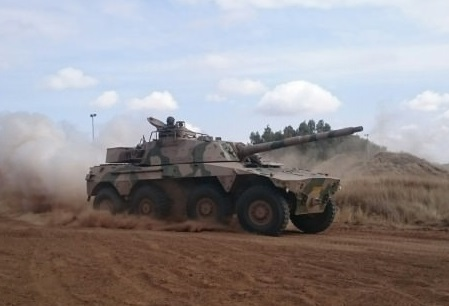
Rooikat Armoured Car

=== Name Change ===
In August 2019, 52 Reserve Force units had their names changed to reflect the diverse military history of South Africa. Regiment Mooirivier became the Molapo Armoured Regiment, and have 3 years to design and implement new regimental insignia.

== Regimental Symbols ==
- Regimental motto: Semper Prorsum.

=== Previous dress insignia ===
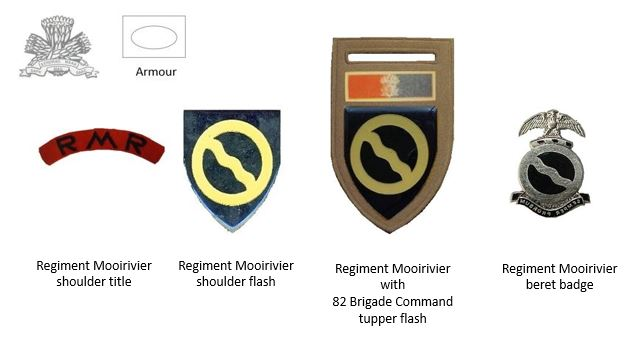
SADF era Regiment Mooirivier insignia

== Leadership ==
Leadership
From	Honorary Colonel	To	Ribbon
n.d.	No known incumbents		
From	Acting Honorary Colonel	To	Ribbon
August 2018	Col Rory Hollins MMM	Present	Military Merit Medal MMM
From	Commanding Officer	To	Ribbon
April 1954	Cmdt J.S. du Plessis	January 1967	
January 1967	Cmdt C.W.A. Steyn	May 1971	
May 1971	Cmdt C.H. Heenop	May 1979	
December 1979	Cmdt S.G. Greyling	December 1987	
January 1988	Lt Col W.H. van Zyl	March 2001	
May 2001	Lt Col T. du P Snyman	May 2005	
May 2005	Lt Col B.J. de Klerk	January 2014	
January 2014	Lt Col H.H-P.J. Stark	September 2017	
September 2017	Maj S.J.B. Brooks	July 2018	
July 2018	Lt Col S.J.B. Brooks	Present	
From	Regimental Sergeant Major	To	Ribbon
April 1954	WO1 P.F. Smit	July 1966	
July 1966	WO1 S.W. van der Merwe	March 1993	
April 1993	WO1 W.J. Wagner	nd	
January 2019	WO1 U.K. Koaishe	Present	
