= Regiment Groot Karoo =

Middellandse Regiment in 1934 renamed Regiment Gideon Scheepers 1954 renamed Regiment Groot Karoo 1960
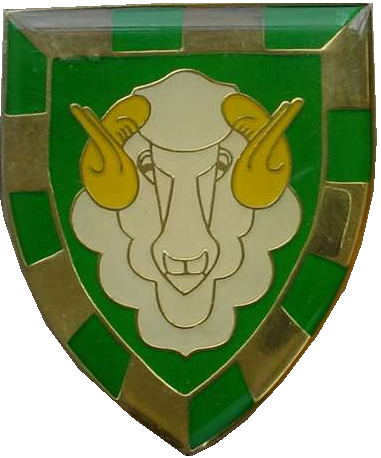
- Regiment Groot Karoo emblem
- Active: 1934 to 1999 – disbanded
- Disbanded: 1999
- Country: South Africa
- Allegiance: Allied forces; South Africa
- Branch: South African Army
- Type: Mechanised Infantry
- Size: Battalion
- Part of: South African Infantry Corps; Army Conventional Reserve
- Garrison/HQ: Graaf Reinet, Cradock, Eastern Cape
- Mottos: Dulce Est Pro patria Mori (It is sweet to die for your country)
Battle honours
Battle Honours
Awarded
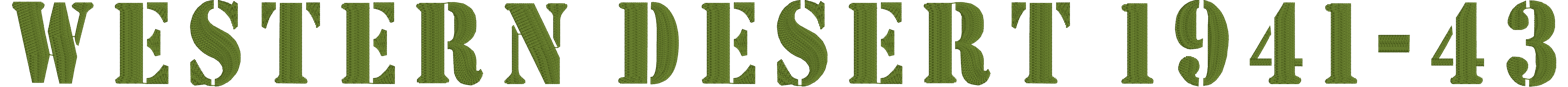

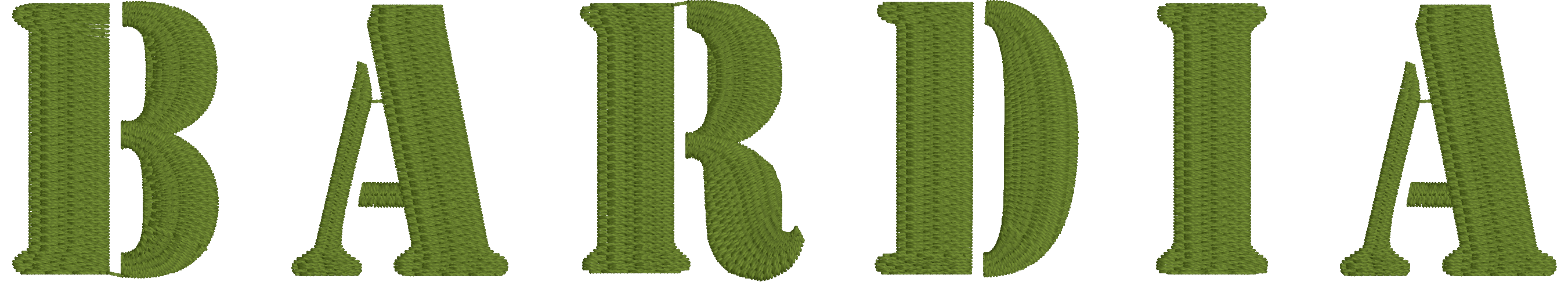

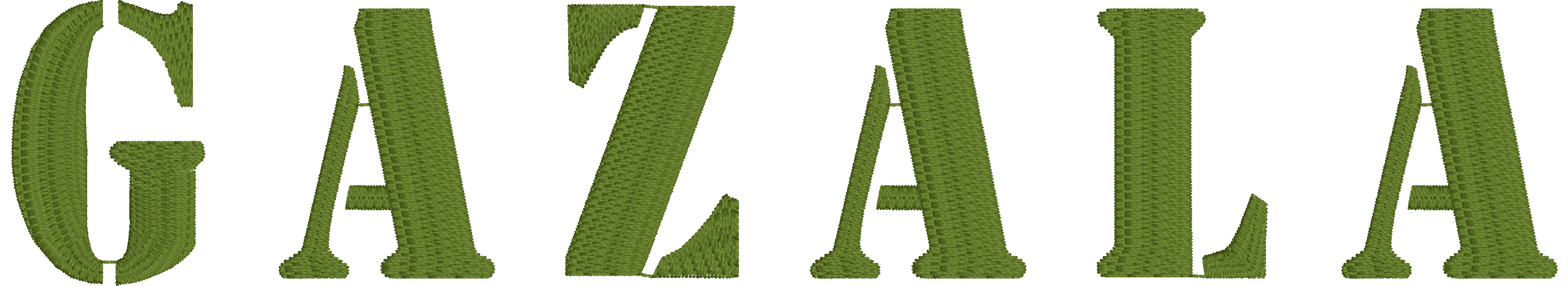

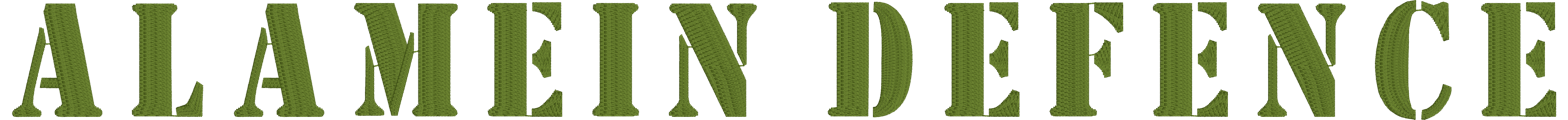

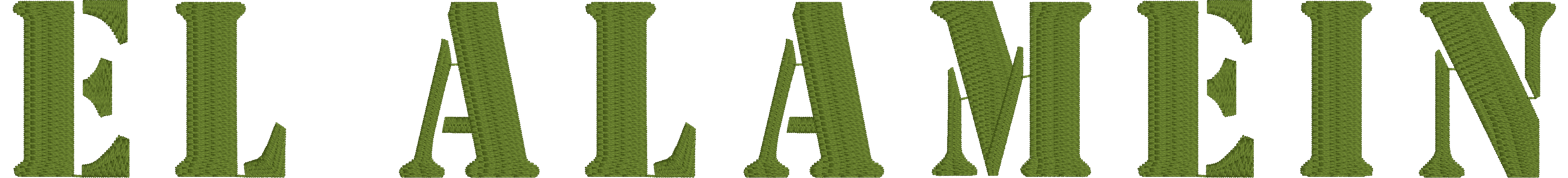

Commanders
- First Commanding Officer: Lt Col H.T.v.G. Bekker
- OC 1939: Lt Col W.L. Kingwall
- OC 1945: Lt Col Borchers
- OC 1954: Commandant F.A. Stetzhorn

Regiment Groot Karoo was an infantry battalion of the South African Army. As a reserve force unit, it had a status roughly equivalent to that of a British Army Reserve or United States Army National Guard unit.

== History ==
=== Origin ===
Regiment Groot Karoo was established in 1934 as one of the new Afrikaans language Citizen Force units of the Union Defence Force. Regiment Groot Karoo has changed its name over its operational lifespan; it was initially referred to as the Middellandse Regiment, then Regiment Gideon Scheepers and finally Regiment Groot Karoo.

The Middellandse Regiment was established as an infantry battalion with Lieutenant Colonel H.T.v.G. Bekker as its first commanding officer.

The regiment was garrisoned in Cradock, but had sections at Graaff-Reinet, Steynsburg, Burgersdorp, Middelburg, Umtata and Aliwal North.

The regiment's first formal training was conducted in East London in 1935 and mainly dealt with the use of the Vickers machine gun. By 1939, however, the regiment's headquarters were removed to Graaff-Reinet, where a new commander, Lt. Col. W.L. Kingwill, was appointed.

== World War II ==
With South Africa's entry in World War II, the Middellandse Regiment got the opportunity to prove itself. Mobilisation orders were received on 5 September 1940. The regiment was assigned to the 9th Infantry Brigade and finally to the 2nd South African Division.

=== North Africa ===
The regiment left for Egypt on board the Mauritania on 10 June, arriving in Suez on 22 June and then being transported to Mareopolis.

By the middle of August 1941, the regiment was transported to El Alamein. After 5 October 1941, 2nd South African Division was placed under the command of the 8th Army and moved to Bagush. The regiment was now responsible for anti-aircraft and area defence at the Fuka airfield as well as protecting the railway line and coast between Bagush and Mersa Matruh.

The regiment was involved in the attack on Bardia between 29 December 1941 and 2 January 1942. A Company of the regiment was involved in the attack on Sollurn. After the fall of Sollurn, the regiment moved on to Barrani but had to return to Sollurn to strengthen positions there.
B Company was moved to Tobruk in March 1942 under command of the 3rd Brigade.

With the eventual fall of Tobruk, 444 members of the regiment were taken prisoner. Due to the fact that the majority of the regiment were now prisoners of war, the regiment was officially disbanded on 6 September 1942, while the remaining members were transferred to Regiment 'President Steyn'. These elements were moved to Quassasin and again reassigned into 1 Rand Light Infantry as the DMR (Die Middellandse Regiment) Company, a reference to their previous regiment. By January 1943, these elements were returned to South Africa.

== Reformed ==
By 1 May 1945 the Middellande Regiment was reformed at Cradock with Lt. Col. Borchers as its new commanding officer. By 1947, the regiment was again returned to Graaff-Reinet.

=== Armour ===
By 1953 the regiment was changed from an armoured vehicle reconnaissance unit to an armoured regiment. During this time the regiment was also notified that its name was being changed to that of 'Regiment Gideon Scheepers'. The rational was that the previous name had no real purpose except to distinguish it from other units and just indicated a locality where the regiment originated from. The new name also brought a change in the unit's insignia, but the merino ram's head was retained, now facing head-on. The laurel wreath was removed and the letters 'RGS' were added. This became effective from 1 January 1954. A new commanding officer, Commandant F.A. Stetzhorn, was also appointed.

During 1959 at a commander's conference at the Eastern Province Command, it was again proposed to change the name of the regiment back to its original name. That proposal was rejected, but the regiment was still renamed to that of Regiment Groot Karoo. This took effect on 1 January 1960. The Regimental emblem remained, except the letters on the bottom changed to RGK.

In 1960, the regiment was ordered to mobilise because of an internal state of emergency in the country. At the same time the regiment was converted to an armoured-infantry unit.

== The Border War ==
The regiment participated in the South African Border War, as part of 82 Mechanised Brigade.

The conflict that took place from 1966 to 1989 in South West Africa (now Namibia) and Angola between South Africa and its allied forces (mainly UNITA) and the Angolan government, South-West Africa People's Organisation (SWAPO), and their allies, the Soviet Union and Cuba.

=== Affiliated Division ===
- 8th South African Armoured Division
  - 82 Mechanised Brigade

== Freedom of Entry ==
With the 200 year celebrations of Graaf-Reinet, the regiment received freedom of entry. It already had freedom, but this time it was granted as a mechanised unit.

== Rationalisation and closure ==
The regiment was transferred to the newly established 9th Division. By 1999, however, the regiment was disbanded.

== Insignia ==
=== Dress Insignia ===
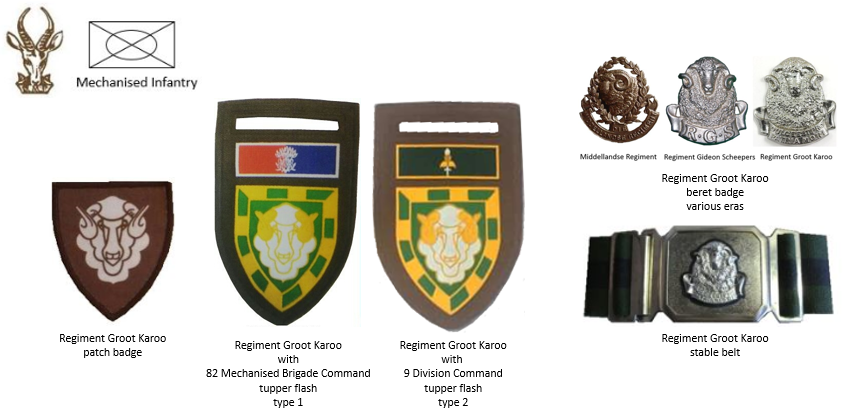
SADF era Regiment Groot Karoo insignia

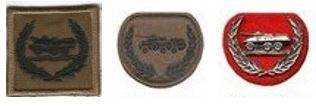
82 Mechanised Brigade Operational Badge field and office versions of which this Regiment was part of

== Battle honours ==
Battle Honours
Awarded to Die Middellandse Regiment/Regiment Groot Karoo
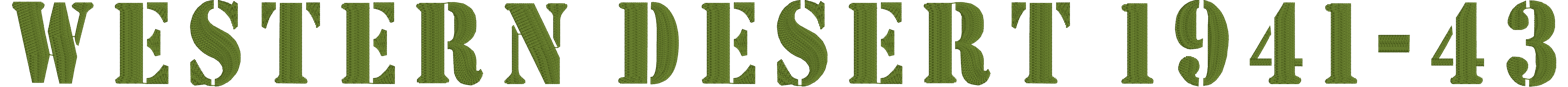
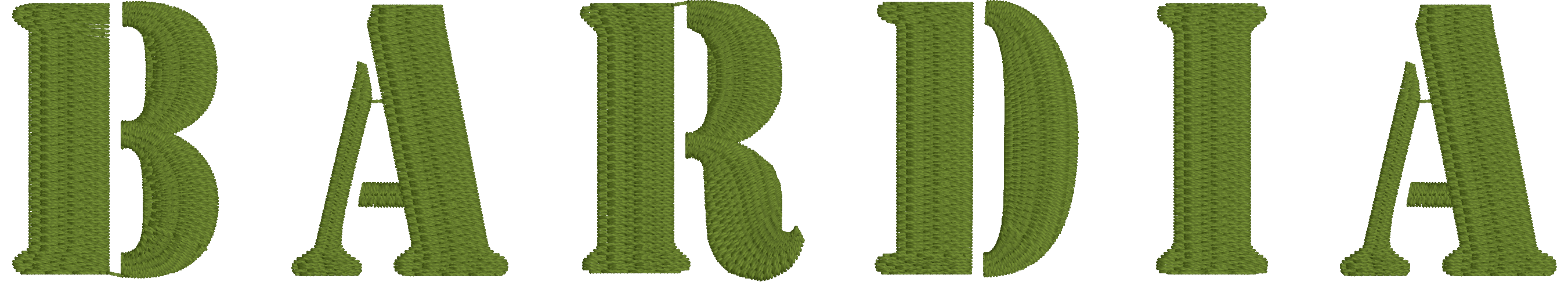
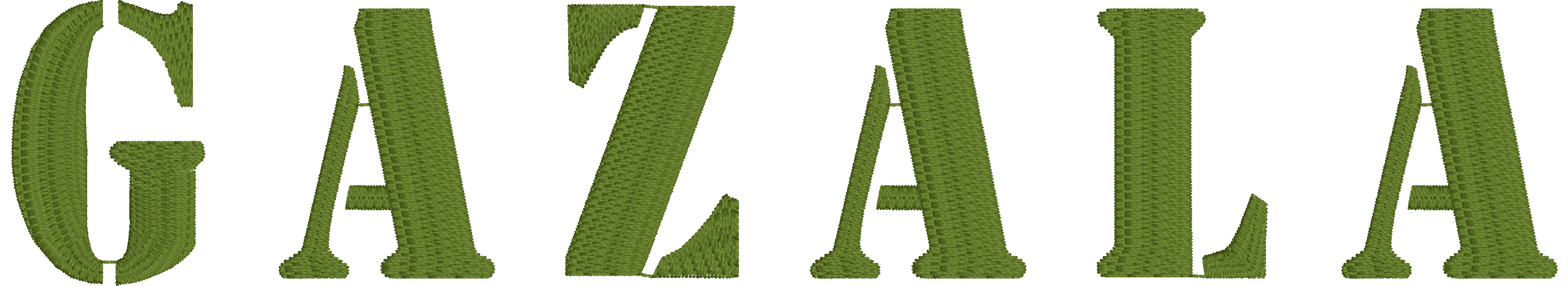
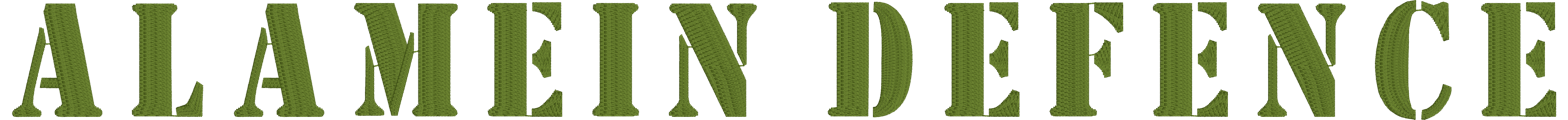
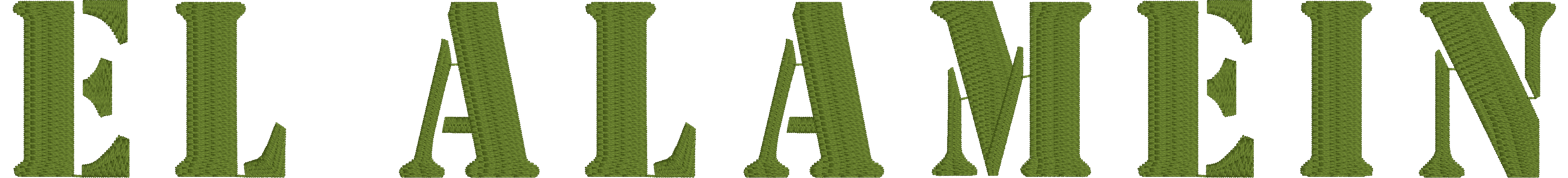

- Western Desert 1941–1943
- Bardia
- Gazala
- Alamein Defence
- El Alamein

== Leadership ==
Leadership
From	Honorary Colonel - Die Middellandse Regiment	To	Ribbon
11 April 1947	Lt Col W.L. Kingwill MC	nd	Military Cross MC
From	Officers Commanding - Die Middellandse Regiment	To	Ribbon
1 April 1934	Lt Col H.T.v.G. Bekker	1936	
1936	Lt Col L.J. De Jongh	1937	
1937	Lt Col W.L. Kingwill MC	1942	Military Cross MC
February 1942	Maj L.E. Lanham MC	6 September 1942	Military Cross MC
1 May 1946	Lt Col Borchers MM	1947	Military Medal MM
1947	Lt Col W.G. Kingwill	1954	
From	Officers Commanding - Regiment Gideon Scheepers	To	Ribbon
August 1954	Cmdt F.A. Stetzhorn	31 December 1959	
From	Officers Commanding - Regiment Groot Karoo	To	Ribbon
1 January 1960	Cmdt F.A. Stetzhorn	8 May 1963	
9 May 1963	Cmdt C.A. Greeff	9 May 1973	
3 Aug 1973	Cmdt L.P. Pretorius	nd	
c. 1992	Cmdt Dougie Stern	nd	
c. 1992	Cmdt A. P. C. Aucamp	nd	
From	Regimental Sergeants Major - Die Middellandse Regiment Regiment Groot Karoo	To	Ribbon
c. 1986	WO1 Jan Heyneke	c. 1987	
c. 1992	WO1 J. A. N. Cloete	c. 1992	

== Insignia ==
The regimental badge depicts a Merino sheep's head, in reference to the large scale sheep farming of the area in which it was located. Memorabilia of this regiment can be viewed at the Graaff-Reinet Military History Museum.
