= 25 Field Artillery =

25 Field Artillery Regiment
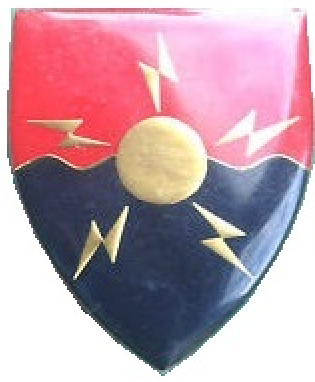
- 25 Field Artillery Regiment emblem
- Active: 1977-1988
- Country: South Africa
- Allegiance: Republic of South Africa
- Branch: South African Army
- Type: Artillery
- Size: Regiment
- Part of: South African Army Artillery Corps; Army Conventional Reserve
- Garrison/HQ: Potchefstroom

Insignia
- Collar Badge: Bursting grenade with seven flames
- Beret Colour: Oxford Blue
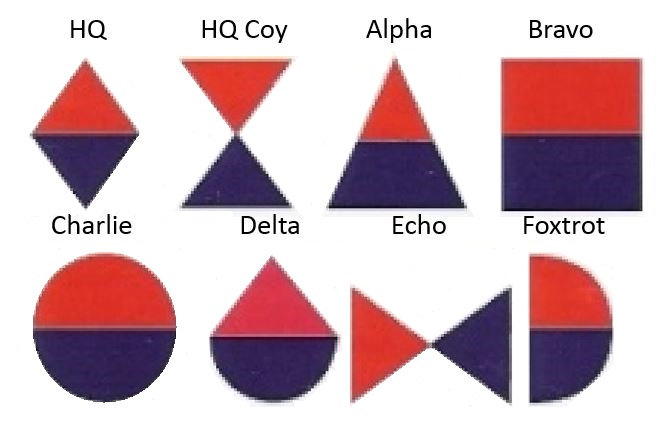
- Artillery Battery Emblems

- Artillery Beret Bar circa 1992

25 Field Artillery Regiment was an artillery regiment of the South African Artillery.

== Origin ==
=== Origin ===
This unit was originally formed as 25 Composite Regiment on 17 May 1977 and was based in Potchefstroom. As a composite unit, it comprised

- a couple of gun batteries,
- heavy mortars and,
- counter artillery locating radar elements.(typically using the Cymbeline Mk1 locating radar)

=== Conversion to a Medium Regiment ===
By 1984 the regiment was altered with the removal of its mortar and radar and its conversion to a medium regiment.

=== Operations ===
On 3 May 1984 the regiment was added to the operational control of Far North Command. As a Citizen Force Regiment, its primary function was artillery support and it secondary function as infantry. The regiment was operational in the border area with Zimbabwe in 1980 and in South West Africa in 1983.

=== Traditions ===
==== Emblem design ====
The regiment had a typical artillery tradition and instead of having colours considered its cannons its colours. The unit received its ceremonial emblems on 21 September 1984. The emblem has the traditional artillery background colours of red and dark blue separated by a gold glowing line depicting the Mooi River. The gold penny represents efficiency while the strikes typify artillery fire. This design also can be seen to show the radar element which was previously part of the unit.

==== Commanding Officer saber ====
Commanding officers were issued a ceremonial saber for the taking over of command.

== Commanding officers ==
- Commandant J.P. Aukamp
- Commandant H.A. Labuschagne

== Insignia ==
=== Dress Insignia ===
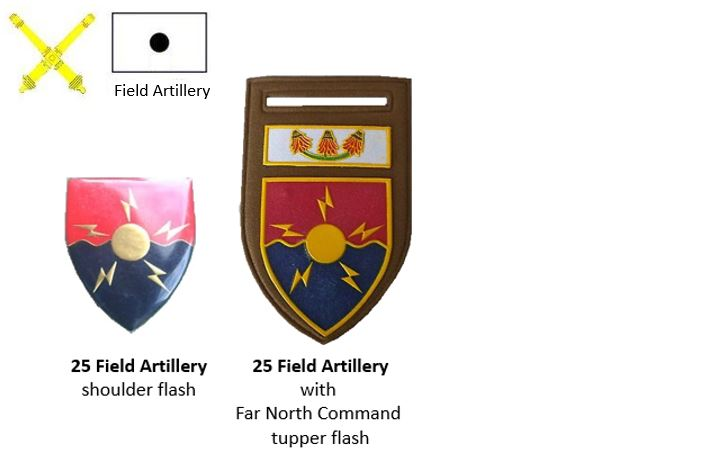
SADF era 25 Field Artillery Regiment insignia

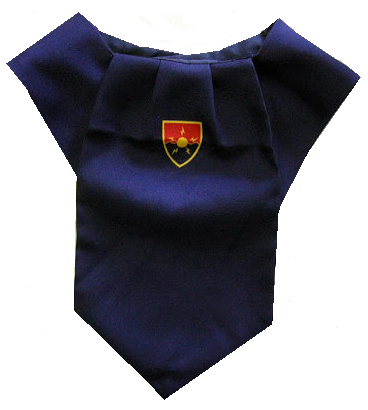
SADF 25 Field Artillery Regiment cravat
