= 8 South African Armoured Division =

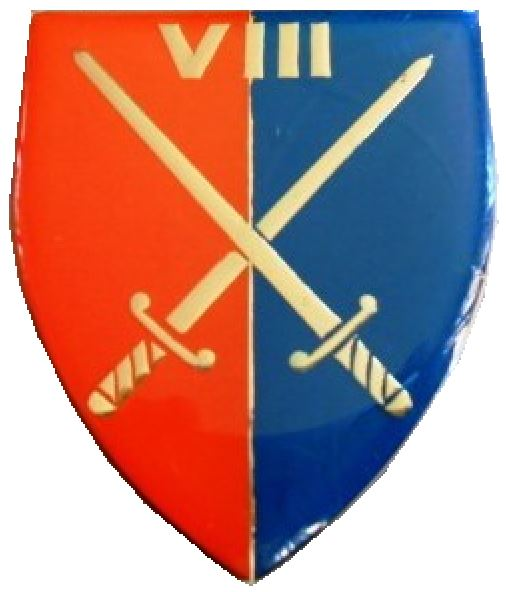
- 8 South African Armoured Division emblem
- Active: 1974-1997
- Country: South Africa
- Branch: South African Army
- Type: Armour
- Size: Division
- Garrison/HQ: Durban
- Major battles: Operation Packer

Commanders
- Founding Commander: Brigadier Ben Roos (1974-1975)

Insignia
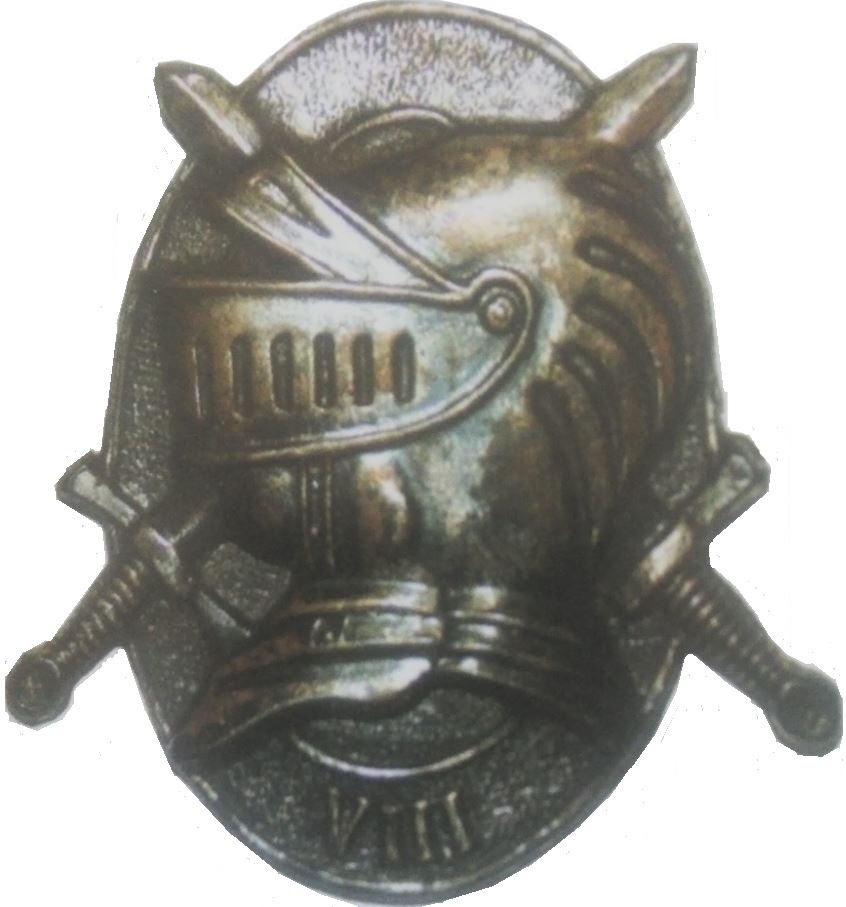
- SADF 8 South African Armoured Division beret badge

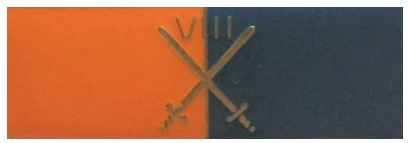
- SADF 8 South African Armoured Division beret bar

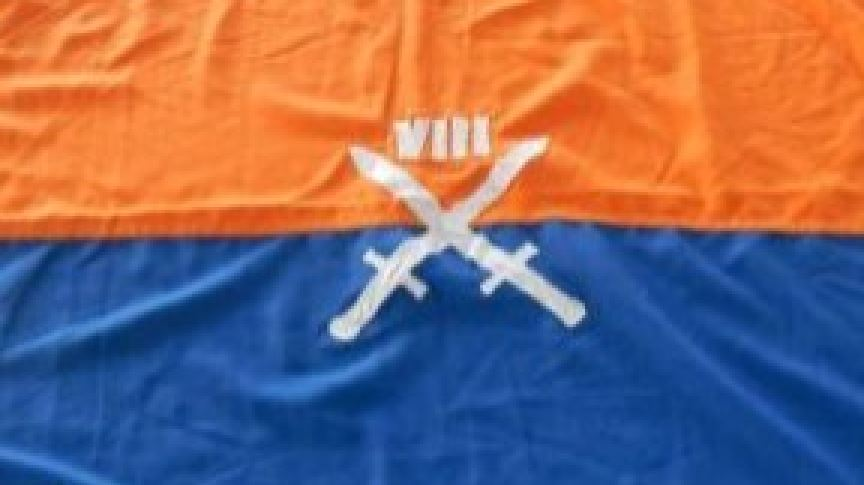
- SADF 8 South African Armoured Division flag

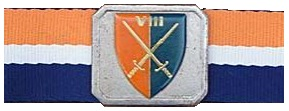
- SADF 8 South African Armoured Division stable belt

8 South African Armoured Division was a formation of the South African Army, active from the 1970s to 1999.

== History ==
8 South African Division was established as an Armoured Formation on August 1, 1974, consisting of 81 Armoured Brigade, 82 Mechanised Brigade and 84 Motorised Brigade. It was, in many respects, a mirror of 7th South African Infantry Division.

A provisional 1977 order of battle had 8 Armoured Division organised as follows:

== Divisional Breakdown ==
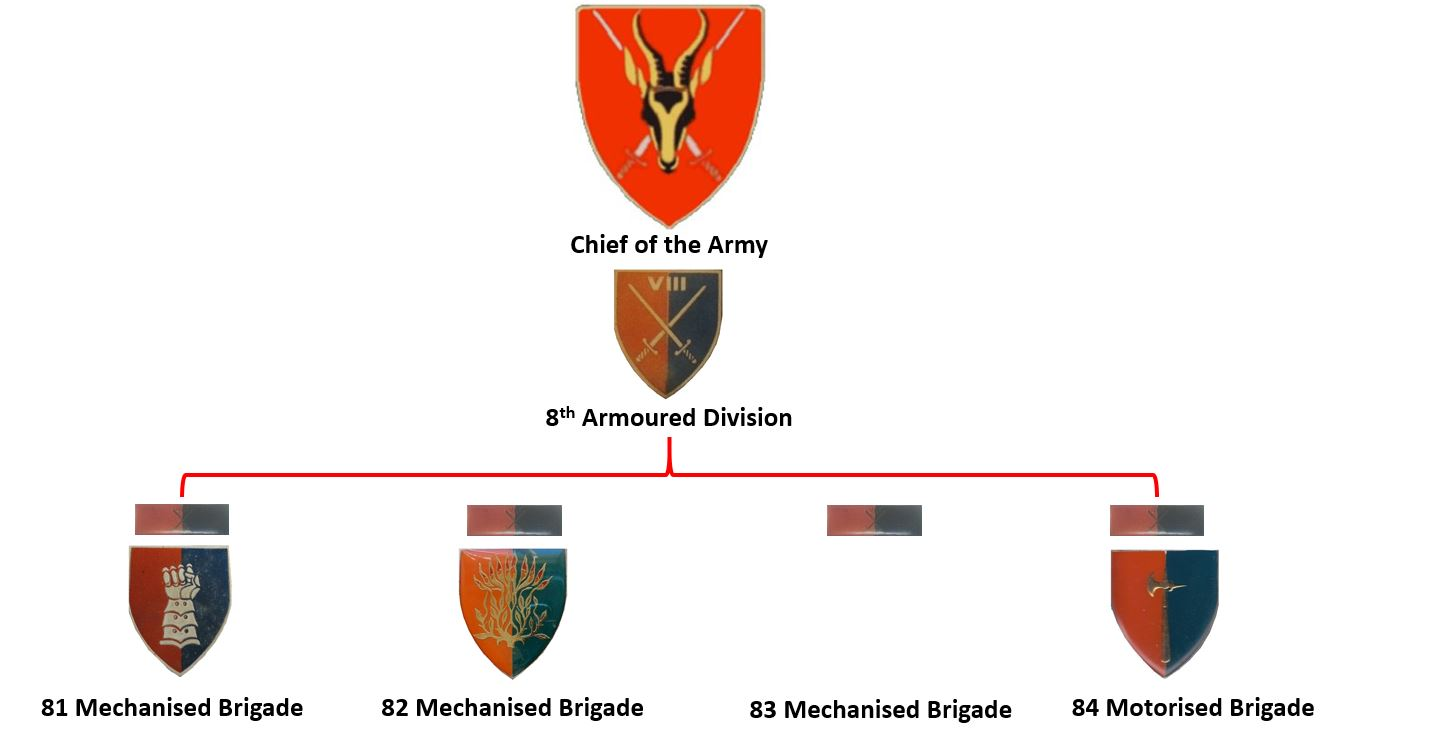
SADF original organigram 8 SA Armoured Division

=== Divisional Level Attached Units ===
==== Artillery, maintenance, engineers, signals and provost (Military Police) ====
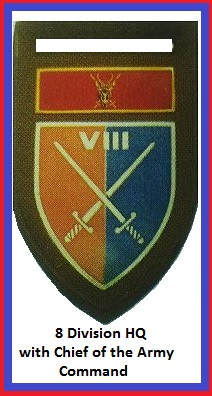
SADF 8 Division with Chief of the Army Command Flash

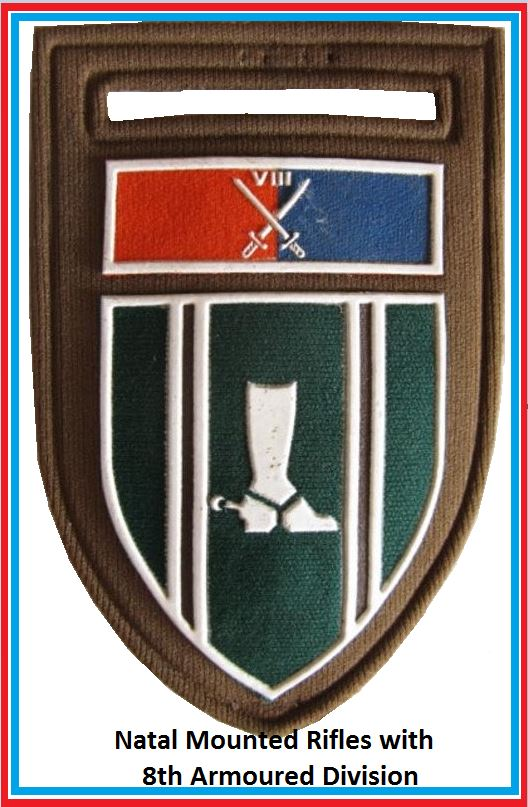
SADF 8 South African Armoured Division Natal Mounted Rifles Flash

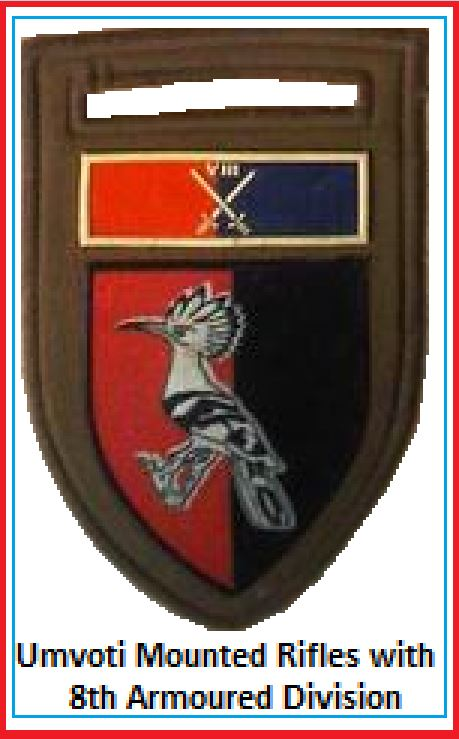
SADF 8 South African Armoured Division Umvoti Mounted Rifles Flash

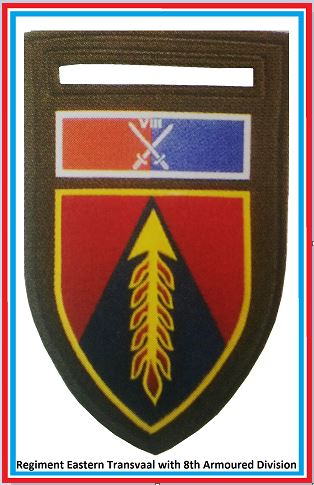
SADF 8 South African Armoured Division Regiment Eastern Transvaal Flash. The regiment provided 20mm anti–aircraft support together with Regiment Overvaal with 35mm AA.

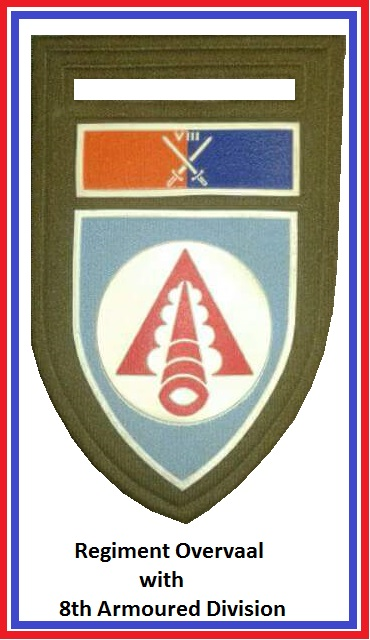
SADF 8 South African Armoured Division Regiment Overvaal

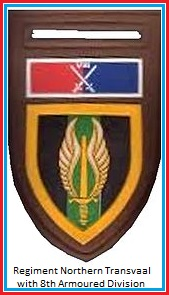
SADF 8 South African Armoured Division Regiment Northern Transvaal Flash

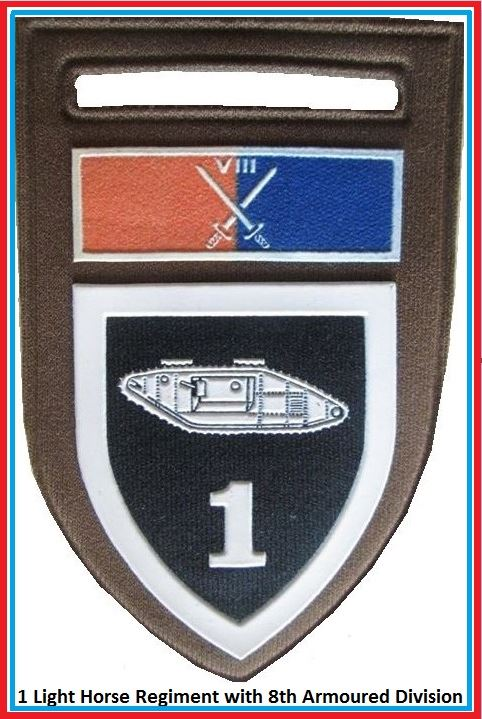
SADF 8 South African Armoured Division 1 Light Horse Regiment Flash

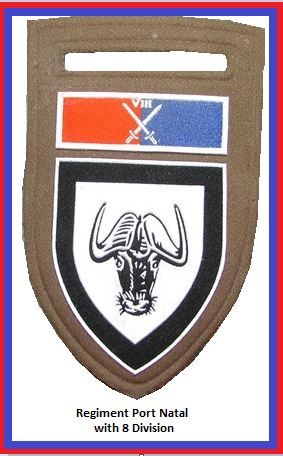
SADF 8 South African Armoured Division Regiment Port Natal Flash

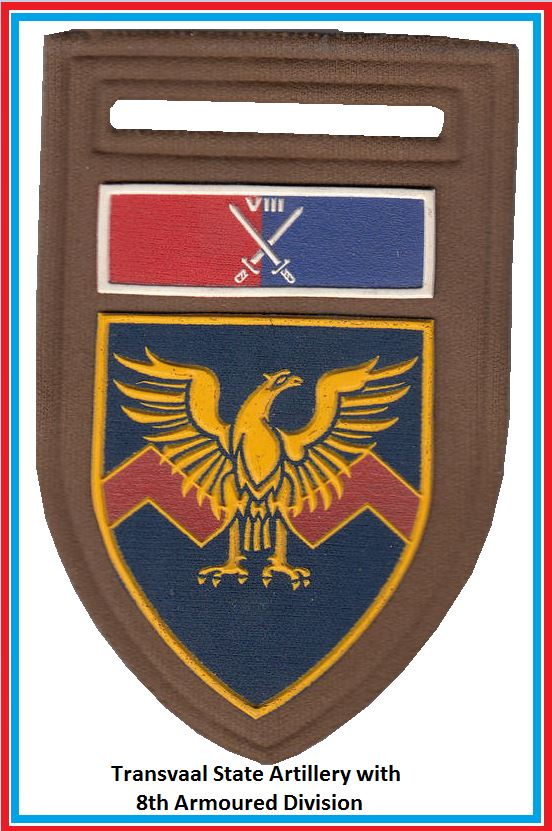
SADF 8 South African Armoured Division Transvaal State Artillery Flash

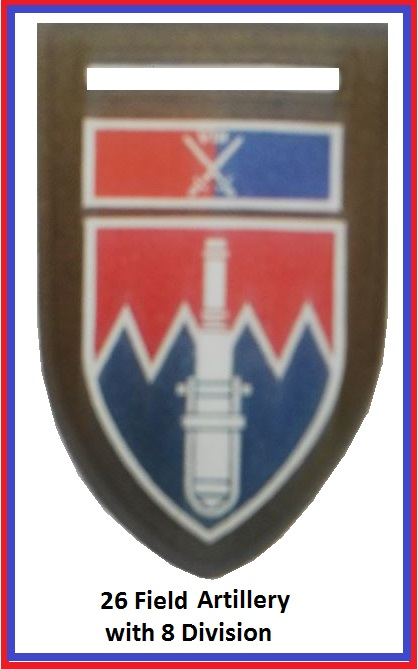
SADF 8 South African Armoured Division 26 Field Artillery Flash

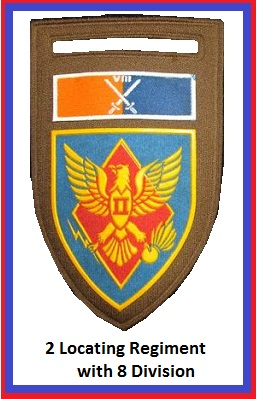
SADF 8 South African Armoured Division 2 Locating Regiment Flash

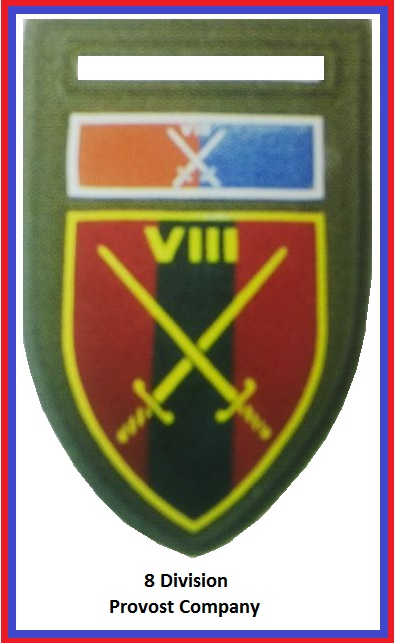
SADF 8 South African Armoured Division Provost Company Flash. During 1998, the unit was renamed to 18 Provost Company and transferred to 1 Provost Regiment of the Military Police Division. This was at the same time that units of the division and its brigades were transferred to Type Formations of the SA Army.

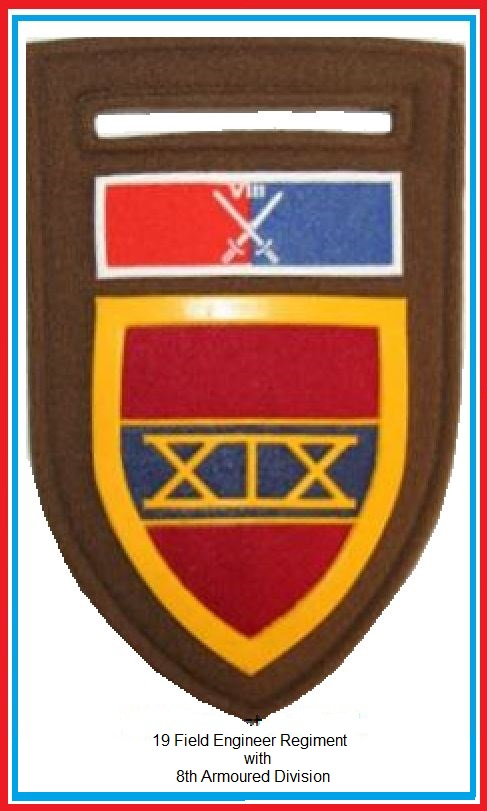
SADF 8 South African Armoured Division 19th Field Engineer Flash

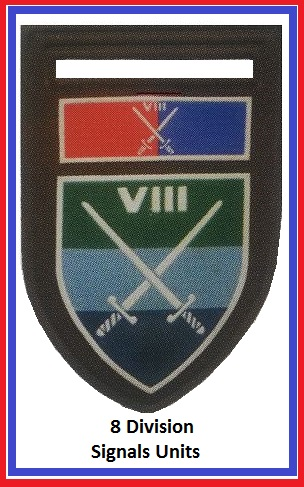
SADF 8 South African Armoured Division Signals Unit Flash

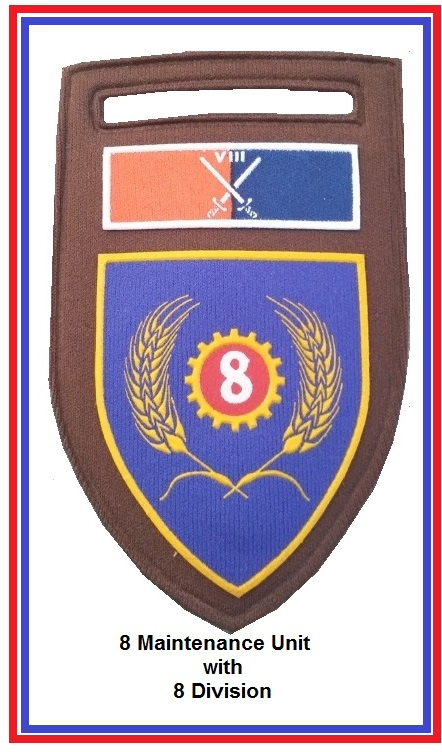
SADF 8 South African Armoured Division 8 Maintenance Unit Flash

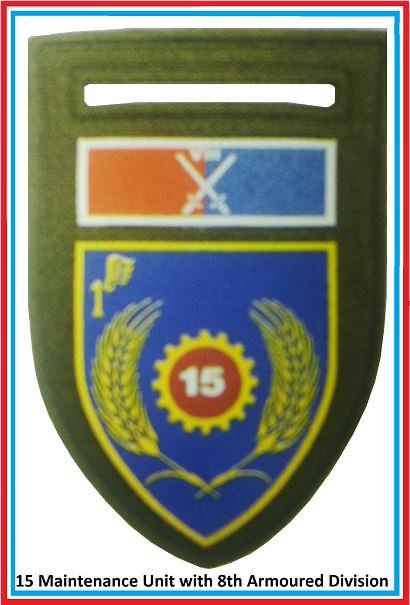
SADF 8 South African Armoured Division 15 Maintenance Unit Flash

=== Brigades ===
==== 81 Armoured Brigade ====
Headquartered in Pretoria, 81 Armoured Brigade consisted of the following units:

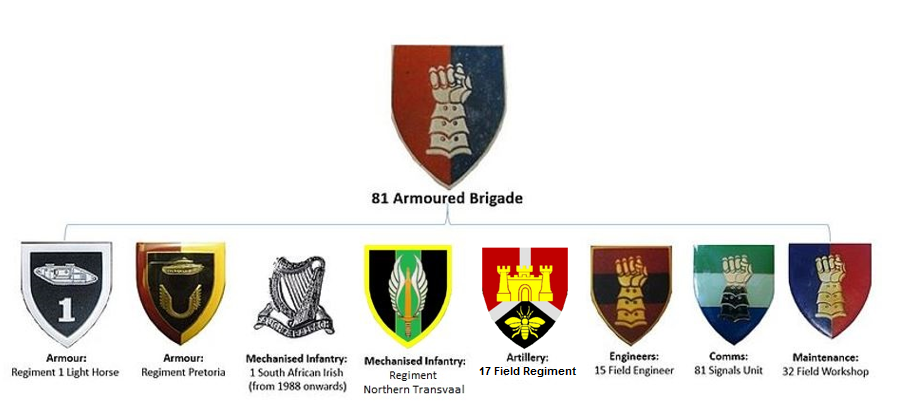
Structure SADF 81 Armoured Brigade

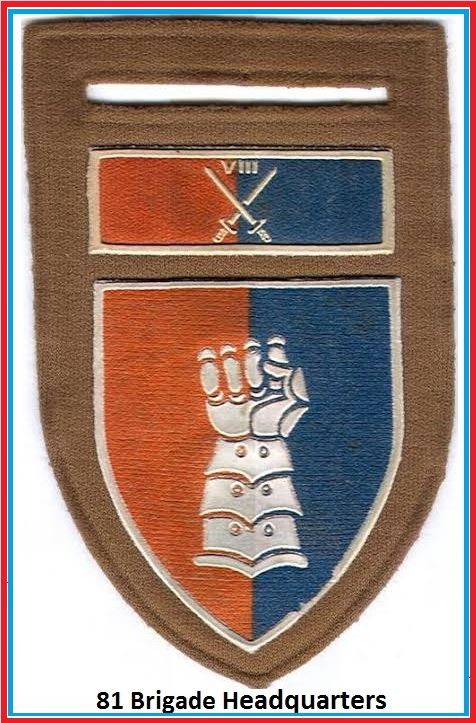
SADF 81 Armoured Brigade Headquarters Flash

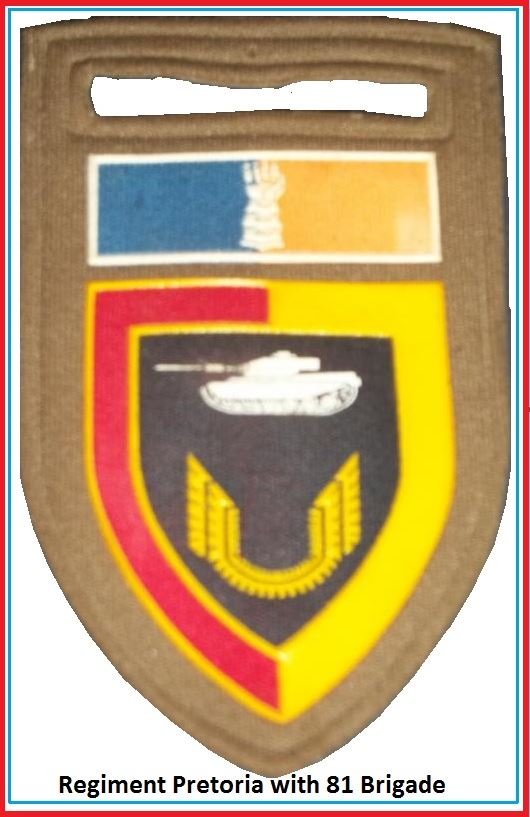
SADF 81 Armoured Brigade Regiment Pretoria Flash

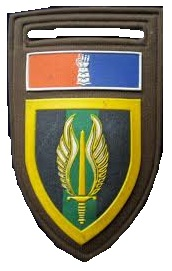
SADF 81 Atrmoured Brigade Regiment Northern Transvaal

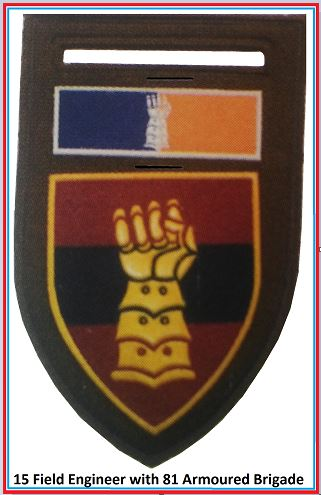
SADF 81 Armoured Brigade 15 Field Engineer Flash

==== 82 Mechanised Brigade ====
Headquartered in Potchefstroom, 82 Mechanised Brigade consisted of the following units:

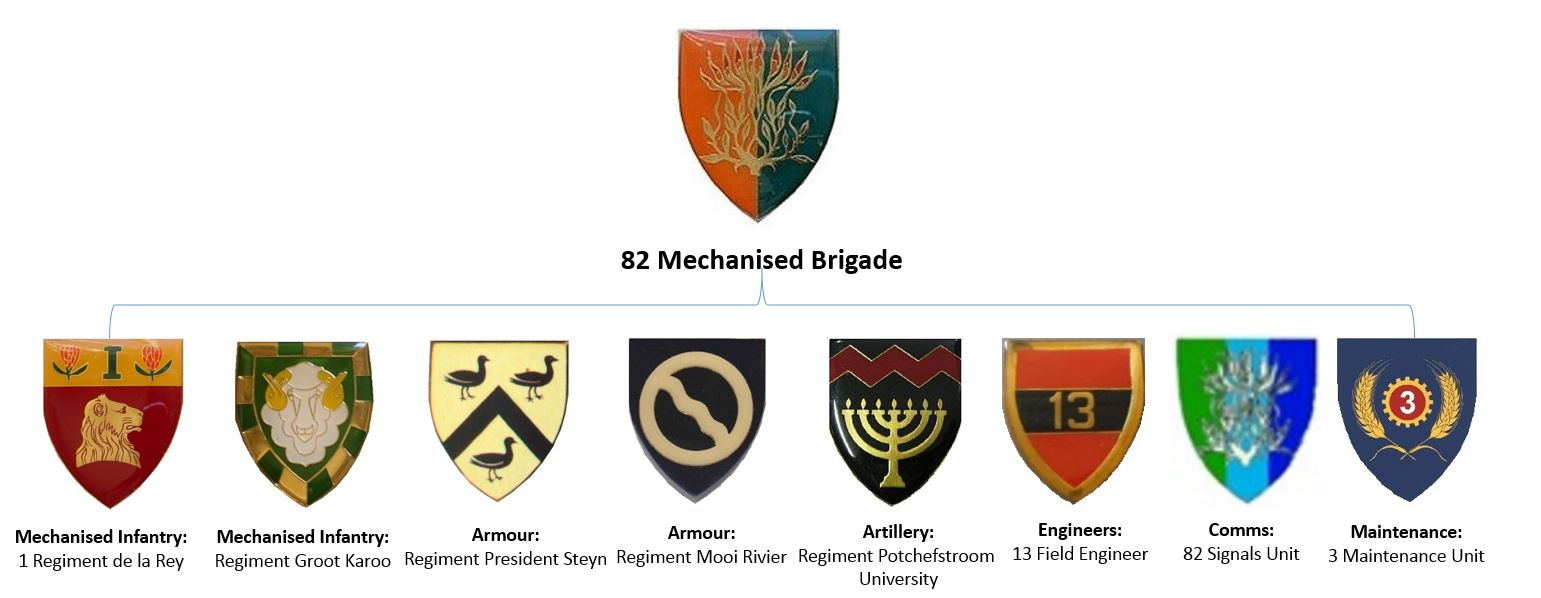
Structure SADF 82 Mechanised Brigade circa 1988

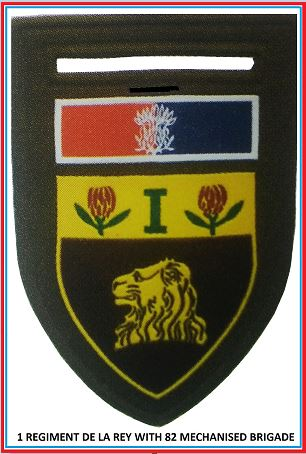
SADF 82 Mechanised Brigade 1 Regiment de la Rey Flash

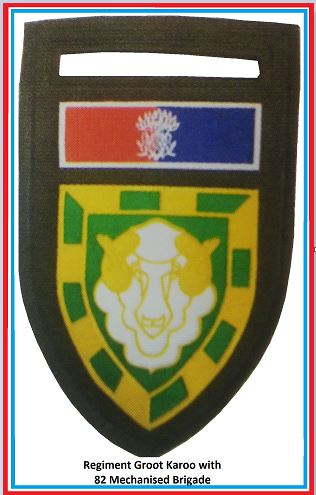
SADF 82 Mechanised Brigade Regiment Groot Karoo Flash

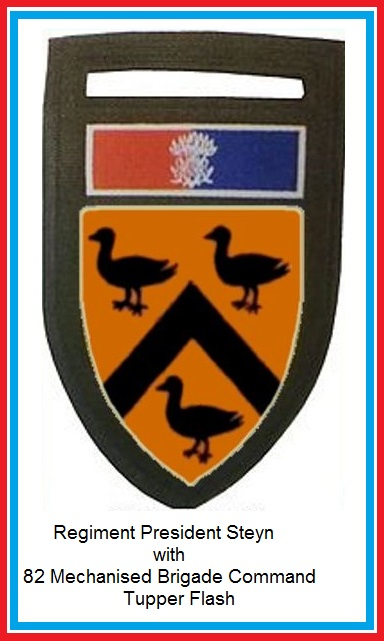
SADF 82 Mechanised Brigade Regiment President Steyn Flash

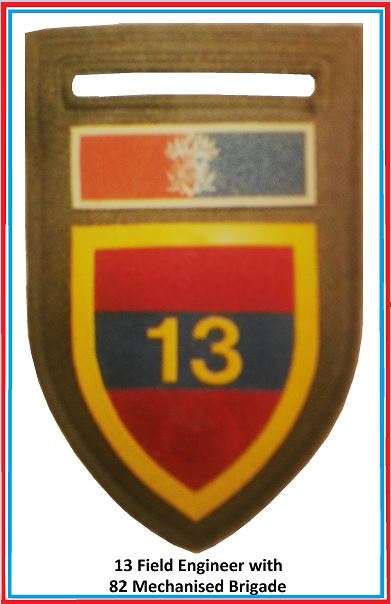
SADF 82 Mechanised Brigade 13 Field Engineer Flash

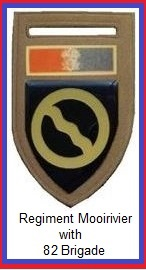
SADF 82 Mechanised Brigade Regiment Mooirivier Flash

===== South West Africa Angolan theater =====
During Operation Packer which succeeded Operation Hooper in March 1988, 82 Mechanised Brigade protected the eastern bank of the Cuito River. During this operation, FAPLA forces suffered losses and the situation on the eastern bank stabilised to such an extent that Operation Displace could be started. During this phase the South African forces withdrew from Angola.

==== 83 Mechanised Brigade ====
83 Mechanised Brigade was never activated.

==== 84 Motorised Brigade ====
Headquartered in Durban, 84 Brigade was formed in Durban as part of 8 South African Armoured Armoured Division on August 1, 1974, and its official establishment was authorized on September 10 of that year. Brigadier G. Wolmarans was authorized as its first commanding officer with Commandant W.P. Sass, Maj H.L. Bosman, and Capt J.E. Samuels as staff officers posted to headquarters. The new Brigade was located at Lords Grounds.

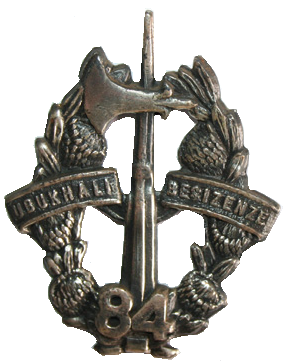
SADF 84 Motorised Brigade beret badge

84 Motorised Brigade consisted of the following units:

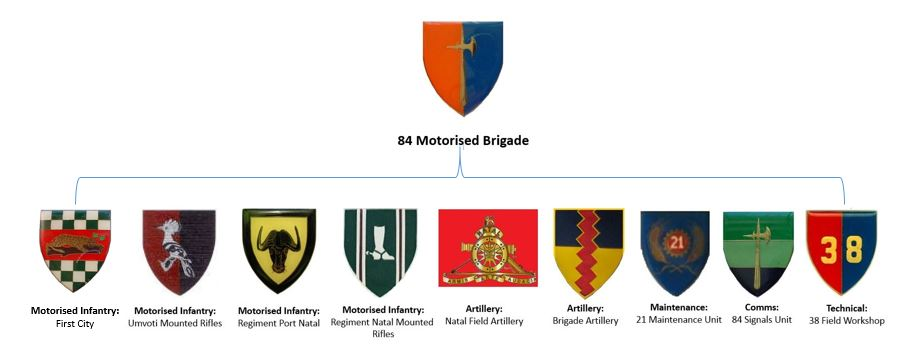
Structure SADF 84 Motorised Brigade

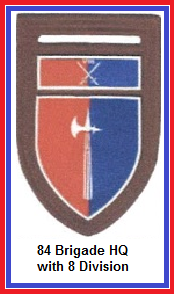
SADF 8 Division 84 Brigade Headquarters Flash

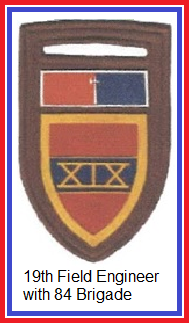
SADF 84 Brigade 19 Field Engineer Unit Flash

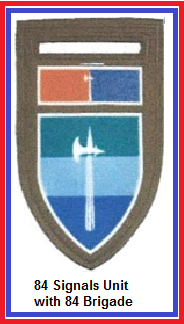
SADF 84 Brigade Signals Unit Flash

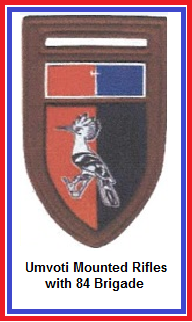
SADF 84 Brigade Umvoti Mounted Rifles Flash

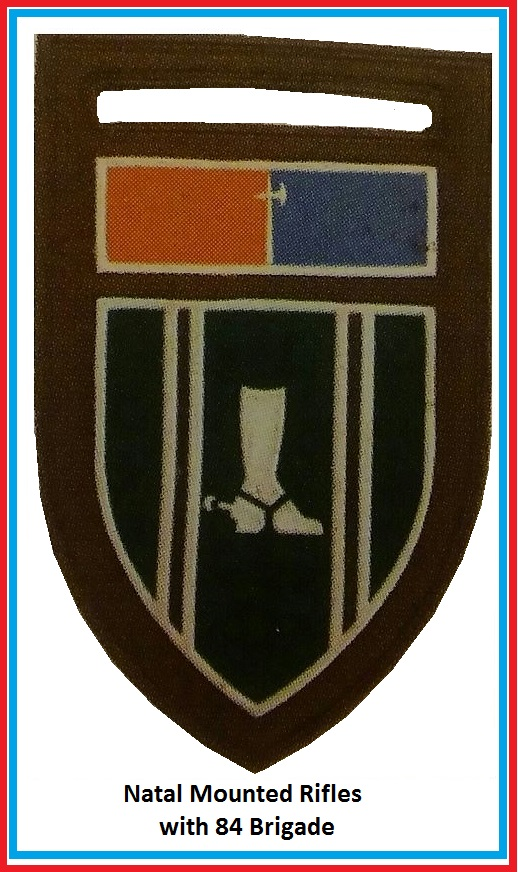
SADF 84 Motorised Brigade Natal Mounted Rifles Flash

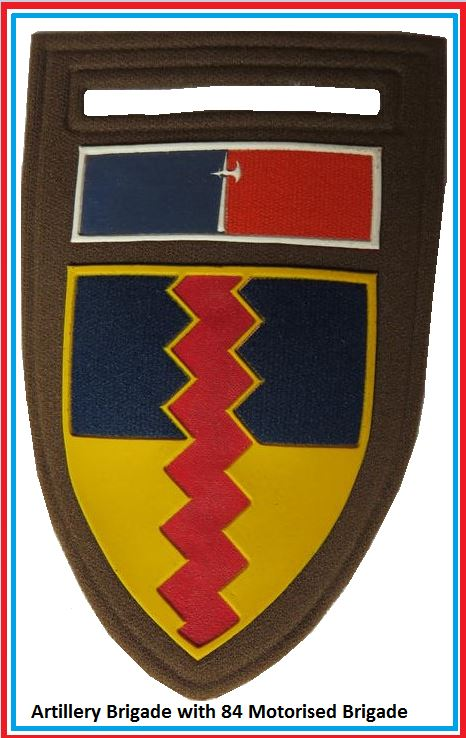
SADF 84 Motorised Brigade Artillery Regiment Flash

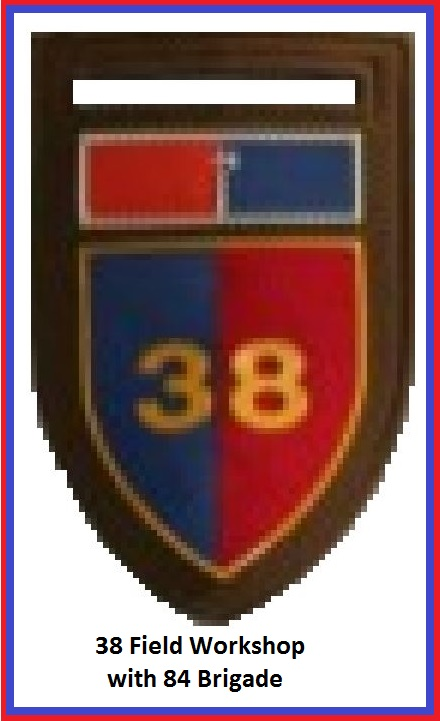
SADF 84 Motorised Brigade 38 Field Workshop Flash

== Leadership ==
Previous Leadership
From	Officer Commanding	To	Ribbon
nd	Brig G. Wolmarans	nd	
nd	Col H.F.P. Riekert	nd	
nd	Col H.F.P. Riekert	nd	
nd	Col Peter Hall (Note: Former OC of 31 Battalion (SWATF) at Omega, Caprivi)	nd	
January 1993	Brig Felix Marius 'Baksteen' Hurter SM,MMM	December 1993	Southern Cross Medal SM Military Merit Medal MMM
From	Regimental Sergeants Major	To	Ribbon
nd	Unknown	nd	

=== Inter-divisional Reorganizing ===
By 1985, 8 Division consisted of 81 Armoured Brigade, 84 Motorised Brigade and 72 Motorised Brigade. 82 Mechanised Brigade had been transferred to the command of 7 South African Infantry Division.

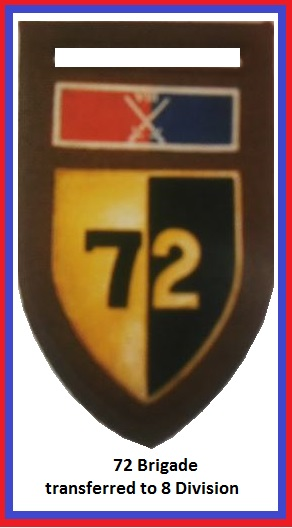
SADF 72 Brigade with 8 South African Armoured Division Command Flash

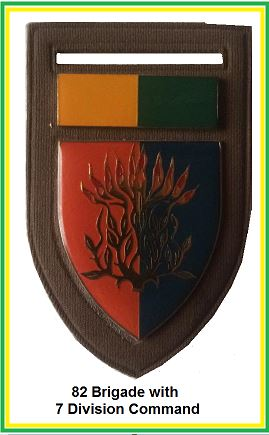
SADF 82 Brigade with 7 South African Infantry Division Command Flash

== Mobilisation ==
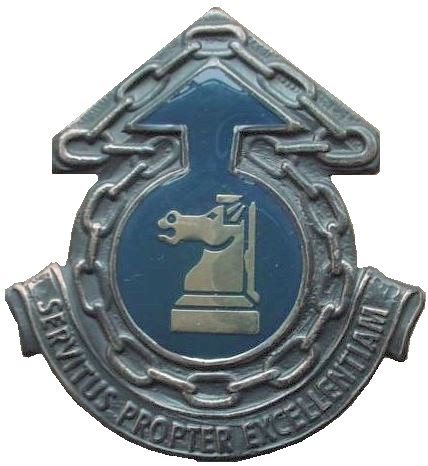
SADF 8 Division Mobilisation Unit transferred to Lohatla Army Battle School and eventually became the Rapid Deployment Force Mobilisation Unit

== Insignia ==
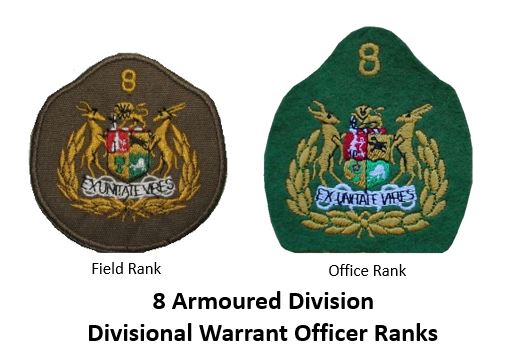
SADF 8th Armoured Division Warrant Officer insignia

== Disbanding ==
=== Brigade Disbanding ===
8 Division's Brigades were disbanded in 1992 and the battalions and regiments came to answer directly to the divisional headquarters - the thinking was that these would be grouped into task forces as required. The concept was never put to a serious test. The Formation was also renamed 8 South African Division.

=== Divisional Disbanding ===
The Division was effectively disbanded on April 1, 1997, when its former units became part of 7th South African Infantry Division as 74 Brigade.

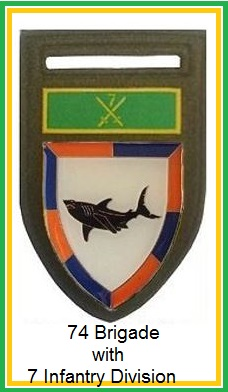
SANDF 8 Division rebadge as 74 Brigade now with 7 Infantry Division tupper flash

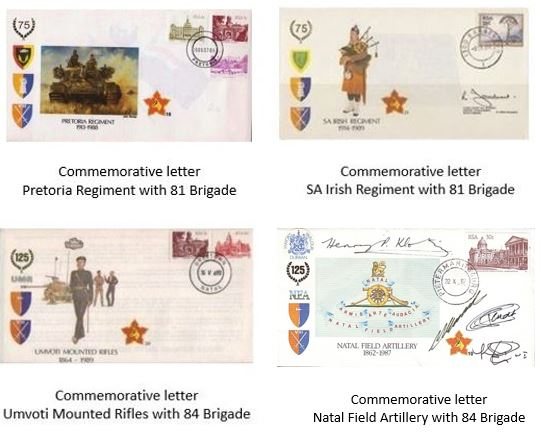
SADF era 8th Armoured Division commemorative letters 1988
