= South African Overseas Expeditionary Force =

Military formations of South Africa in World War I

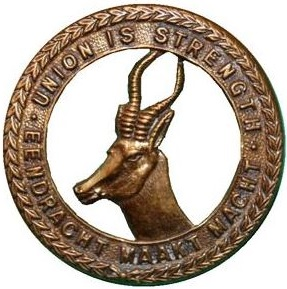
- Cap badge of the 1st SA Infantry Brigade
- Active: 1915–1919
- Disbanded: 1919
- Country: Union of South Africa
- Allegiance: United Kingdom of Great Britain and Ireland
- Branch: Army
- Type: Infantry
- Size: 250,000+
- Engagements: Egypt campaign (1916); Western Front campaign (1916–1918); German East Africa campaign (1916–1918); Palestine campaign (1917–1918)
- Battle honours: Awarded to the 1915 Cape Corps in 1973: Kilimanjaro; Behobeho; Nyangao; East Africa 1916 – 1917; East Africa 1917–1918; Megiddo 1918; Nablus; Palestine 1918

Commanders
- Notable commanders: Lt-Genl Jan Smuts; Lt-Genl Sir Jacob van Deventer; Maj-Genl Sir Henry Timson Lukin

The South African Overseas Expeditionary Force (SAOEF) was a volunteer military organisation in World War I.

== Organisation ==
The South African government formed the South African Overseas Expeditionary Force (SAOEF) in July 1915, as part of its contribution to the British war effort against the Central Powers. As South African legislation restricted the Union Defence Forces (UDF) to operating in southern Africa, an entirely new force, made up of volunteers, had to be raised for service in other theatres of war. As they were not officially a South African force, the SAOEF was placed under British operational command for operations on the Western Front. (Note: The South African Union Defence Act of 1914 prohibited the deployment of South African troops beyond the borders of the South Africa and its immediate neighbouring territories. In order to send troops to Europe to support the Commonwealth in World War I, Generals Botha and Smuts created the South African Overseas Expeditionary Force. However, because of the limitations of the Defence Act, they issued a General Order (Order 672 of 1915) which stated that The South African Overseas Expeditionary Force will be Imperial and have the status of regular British Troops. "Status" was meant to imply administrative purposes, as Britain was paying for the maintenance of the force in the field for the sake of local political sensitivities. Regrettably, this Administrative Order later meant that the South African units which served as part of the Overseas Expeditionary Force were not, as South African units, entitled to retain Regimental Colours awarded to them for battles fought as "British" units. The 1st Infantry Brigade Group was the first unit to be formed as a constituent part of the South African Overseas Expeditionary Force. Reference Digby p.146)

Many volunteers came from UDF units, but they enrolled as individuals, not as contingents, and there was no formal link between SAOEF and UDF units as such.

The SAOEF consisted of several arms of service:

- 1st South African Infantry Brigade. The brigade was commanded by Brigadier General H.T. (Tim) Lukin and consisted of four regiments recruited from existing military units, as well as amongst civilian volunteers. Regiments were raised in all four provinces of South Africa, as well as Rhodesia
  - The 1st SA Infantry Regiment was commanded by Lt Col F.S. Dawson, with the regiment being raised from the Cape Province and known as "The Cape Regiment." A Company (Western Province) was made up from men mostly from the Duke of Edinburgh's Rifles. B. Company was recruited from the Eastern Province and C Company was from Kimberley, with many of the men being formerly of the Kimberley Regiment. D Company was recruited from Cape Town.
  - The 2nd South African Infantry Regiment was commanded by Lt Col W.E.C. Tanner, with the regiment being raised from Natal and Orange Free State. Many volunteers were from the Kaffrarian Rifles.
  - The 3rd South African Infantry Regiment was commanded by Lt Col E.F. Thackeray, with the regiment being raised from Transvaal and Rhodesia. The regiment was generally known as "The Transvaal Regiment." B Company were mostly from the Witwatersrand Rifles while C Company were men from the Rand Light Infantry.
  - The 4th SA Infantry Regiment was commanded by Lt Col F.A. Jones, DSO and became known as the "South African Scottish." Lt Col Jones was killed in fighting in Bernafay Wood on 11 July 1916 and was replaced at the Battle of Delville Wood by Major D.M. MacLeod. The regiment was raised from the Cape Town Highlanders Regiment and the area of Cape Town (A Company) while members of 1st Bn Transvaal Scottish Regiment made up most of B Company. C Company came from 2nd Bn Transvaal Scottish Regiment and recruits encouraged by the Caledonian Societies of Natal and Orange Free State made up D Company.
- South African Heavy Artillery Brigade. On the Western Front, the brigade was armed with 6" Howitzers and was placed under command of the Royal Garrison Artillery, consisting of (April 1916):
  - 71st (SA) Siege Battery, RGA
  - 72nd (SA) Siege Battery, RGA
  - 73rd (SA) Siege Battery, RGA
  - 74th (SA) Siege Battery, RGA
  - 75th (SA) Siege Battery, RGA
  - 125th (SA) Siege Battery, RGA
- SA Field Artillery
- SA Horse (Mounted Rifles): ten battalions
- SA Rifles (Dismounted Rifles): two battalions
- Cape Corps: two infantry battalions and a labour battalion
- Engineer, signals, supply and transport, medical, and veterinary units
- South African Native Labour Corps

SAOEF units and formations did not serve as distinct South African forces, but were integrated into the British imperial armies and divisions in the field.

== Campaigns ==
The SAOEF fought in four campaigns:

=== German East Africa campaign (1916–1918) ===
During the East African campaign (World War I), there was strong South African participation and leadership. SA Field Artillery, the 1st and 2nd SA Mounted Brigades, the 2nd and 3rd SA Infantry Brigades, and the Cape Corps fought in British operations against German forces in German East Africa (now Tanzania) from January 1916 until the war in Africa ended on 25 November 1918. Two South African generals, Lt. Gen. Jan Smuts and Lt. Gen. Sir Jacob van Deventer, commanded the operations. Their major battles were: Salaita Hill, Kilimanjaro, and Kondoa-Irangi in 1916; and Behobeho, Narungombe, and Nyangao in 1917.

Captain William Anderson Bloomfield won the Victoria Cross for gallantry.

The East African Campaign was a series of battles and guerrilla actions which occurred in German East Africa, before spreading to areas within Portuguese Mozambique, Northern Rhodesia, British East Africa, the Uganda Protectorate and the Belgian Congo. Britain was keen to deny the Imperial German Navy merchant raiders ports on the Indian Ocean coast, as well as denying a base where German land forces could conduct cross border raids into neighbouring British or Allied colonies. After a disastrous British Indian Army amphibious landing in November 1914 at Tanga, South Africa was requested by London to lead the campaign, defeat General Paul von Lettow-Vorbeck, and occupy German East Africa.

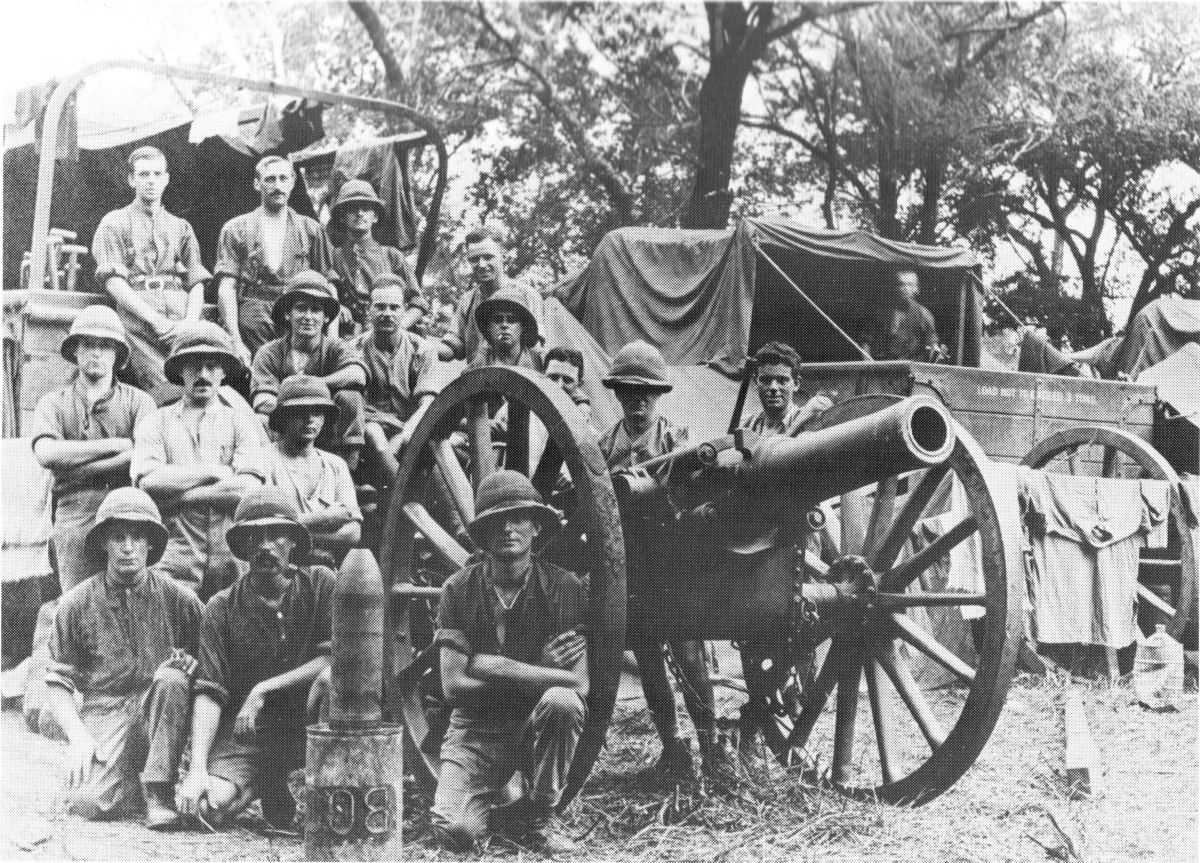
South African troops with BL 5.4 inch Howitzer. East Africa

By early 1916, Jan Smuts had succeeded General Sir Horace Smith-Dorrien as commander of British forces in East Africa and began replacing British officers with South Africans such as Brits and Van Deventer. Smuts was keen to deploy large and fast sweeping operations that would encircle German forces and avoid high numbers of casualties, similar to actions Botha and Smuts conducted in South-West Africa. By insisting on an offensive immediately, however, Smuts underestimated the debilitating effect the jungle would have on military operations. Commanding a force of roughly 40,000 South African and Indian soldiers, Smuts' offensives pushed Von Lettow-Vorbeck and 4,000 men into a slow and determined fighting withdrawal southward towards the interior of the colony. In May 1916, a force of 3,000 South Africans under Van Deventer threatened as major central railway after capturing the town of Kondoa Irangi. Due to the rainy season, the force became completely cut off as roads and bridges were swept away. Left to scavenge for food locally, the fall in health and morale was considerable. By the end of June one-third of the troops were sick and only 1,000 out of 4,000 horses were fit as the rains, thick jungle and tropical diseases took hold.

Although offensives along the coastline had been significantly more successful, with the key port of Dar es Salaam falling by the end of September 1916, military operations for the interior became increasingly frustrated and hindered by disease. In an environment where vehicles were of limited use, between June and September over 53,000 draught animals had died from illness, with most South African units losing half their number to disease and poor nutrition. By the end of 1916, Smuts was advocating that ill-suited European troops be replaced by Africans that could better deal with the harsh conditions. After just six months of the offensive, over 12,000 white South Africans were invalided home due to sickness and exhaustion.

Smuts, with the campaign stalling around the Rufigi River, left his East African Command after being asked to join the Imperial War Cabinet in London. Although Smuts' offensives had been successful, securing three-quarters of German East African territory and its entire infrastructure, Von Lettow-Vorbeck and his small force refused to surrender and continued to engage in a strategy that drew disproportionate amounts of Allied resources away from Europe. During a brief command under British General Reginald Hoskins, the exhausted and derailed campaign underwent mass reorganisation and reform. Conscious of the poor health of his men and significant supply problems, all offensives were delayed until after the heavy rains, medical services and transport were improved, lines of communication became better developed and more European soldiers were replaced with African soldiers, particularly the dramatically expanding King's African Rifles. Despite having achieved much, suspected intrigue from Smuts led to Hoskins being relieved of his command after only four months. On 23 April 1917, South African Jacob van Deventer assumed command of the Imperial force in East Africa.

From July, Van Deventer undertook a series of pincer movements against German positions for control of water stores and food-producing areas. With a mostly Indian and African army by this time, a major battle took place in October at Mahiwa that saw over 2,000 Allied and 600 German casualties. Although Van Deventer lost more men, Von Lettow-Vorbeck faced a far more serious situation as he could afford the casualties and had to abandon already dwindling ammunition, supplies and field guns. By November 1917, Von Lettow-Vorbeck had led his column of 300 European and 1,800 African soldiers in Portuguese Mozambique in search of food and supplies. During the final phases of the campaign Imperial forces totalled 52,000 men, although only 2,500 South Africans were part of this, mainly in support roles. After Van Deventer moved into Mozambique in pursuit in July 1918, Von Lettow-Vorbeck skilfully outmanoeuvred the South African and returned to German East Africa to conduct supply raids on the lightly defended Northern Rhodesia border.

Two weeks after the armistice signed in Europe, on 25 November 1918 Von Lettow-Vorbeck finally surrendered at Abercorn near Lake Tanganyika after evading capture for over four years. His strategy of drawing Allied resources away from Europe into a colonial sideshow had been immensely successful. Against a small force that at the most totalled 14,000, mostly colonial soldiers (Askaris), Britain had deployed 114,000 European, Indian and African men. 10,000 died during the campaign, mainly due to disease and over 100,000 African supplier carriers died of sickness and exhaustion. Although South Africa did have territorial ambitions after playing a significant part in the campaign, most of German East Africa became a British administered mandate.

=== Egypt campaign (1916) ===
In the summer of 1915, the Ottoman Empire persuaded the Grand Senussi Ahmed Sharif, who held lands in formerly Ottoman Libya, to invade British-occupied Egypt from the west and encourage mass insurrection in support of the Ottoman offensive against the Suez Canal in the east.

During December 1915, it was decided to deploy the 1st South African Brigade, which had been training in Britain since August, to Egypt to fight alongside Imperial forces against the Senussi due to the South African's having recent desert experience. British Imperial forces at first withdrew eastwards, before then defeating the Senussi in several engagements, including the action of Agagia. The South African Brigade helped to recapture territory along the coast as part of the Western Frontier Force of the Egyptian Expeditionary Force. After the recapture of the final settlement of Sallum on the Libyan – Egyptian border on 14 March 1916, the brigade was then transferred back to the Western Front as part of the 9th (Scottish) Division. It fought in the action of Halazin and the action of Agagiya.

=== Western Front campaign (1916–1918) ===
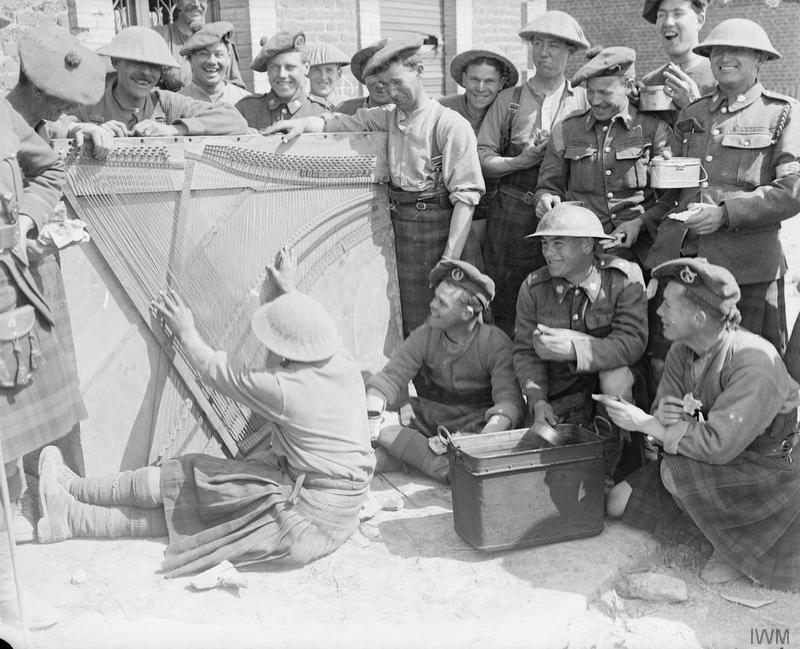
Troops of the South African Scottish regiment in France, 1917

From April 1916 until the war in Europe ended on 11 November 1918, South Africa fought alongside other Allied nations at battles of the Somme in 1916; Arras, Ypres, and Menin in 1917; and Passchendaele, Messines, Mont Kemmel, and Cambrai in 1918. Two events of the campaign are still commemorated today and are a symbol of remembrance – the Battle of Delville Wood, and the sinking of the troopship SS Mendi. Two South Africans, Private William Frederick Faulds and Lance Corporal William Henry Hewitt, would also go on to win the Victoria Cross – the Empire's highest medal for gallantry.

Attached to the British 9th (Scottish) Division, the South African 1st Infantry Brigade was deployed to France in mid-April 1916 in anticipation of the upcoming Somme Offensive. Occupying front line trenches throughout May, and then later in reserve, the Brigade reportedly gained a reputation for imitating Zulu war songs and dances when at the front.

As the Somme Offensive declined into a war of attrition with enormous casualties on both sides, the Brigade was ordered to capture Delville Wood, just to the east of Longueval, on 14 July and hold it at all costs. At dawn the following day, the 3,000 South African soldiers led by Lieutenant Colonel William Tanner successfully captured most of the wood and started to prepare defensive positions. As the wood formed a salient in the German front line, the Brigade could be fired on by German artillery from three sides and faced determined counter-attacks. Although there were frequent British attempts to relieve the pressure on the South Africans, stiff German resistance pushed them back. It was only four days later on 19 July that the South African Brigade was finally relieved and taken off the line. Of the 3,000 men that went into Delville Wood, less than 800 men were able to report for duty the following day. 750 South Africans had died during the four-day battle, with 1,500 wounded, captured or missing. Suffering constant artillery fire and an eventual two-thirds casualty rate, South Africa won great respect for their courage and holding their objective. In 1920, South Africa purchased the land from France and erected a National Memorial in remembrance, a monument that is still cared for today.

After the Brigade was effectively reconstituted with the arrival of nearly 3,000 recruits, it continued to be involved in highly intensive operations with high casualty rates. The attacks on the Butte de Warlencourt in October 1916 incurred a further 1,150 casualties, and a further 700 at Arras in April 1917. After these attacks, which resulted in small territorial gain, it was rumoured the brigade began to refer to themselves as 'suicide Springboks'. At the Battle of Passchendaele in September 1917, the South African brigade suffered over 1,000 casualties out of an original 2,600 men, although managed to secure their objectives. As the war entered its final year, in early 1918 the Brigade was tasked with holding a defensive position at Gouzeaucourt, near Cambrai, in anticipation of the German spring offensive. Numbering by this point at roughly half its normal complement of 3,000 men, the South African line was forced to withdraw after their strong points were overwhelmed after the German attack on 21 March. Suffering over 900 casualties, the surviving 700 men fought their way north to escape encirclement. By the armistice in November 1918, South African battalions were reduced to only 300 men in each.

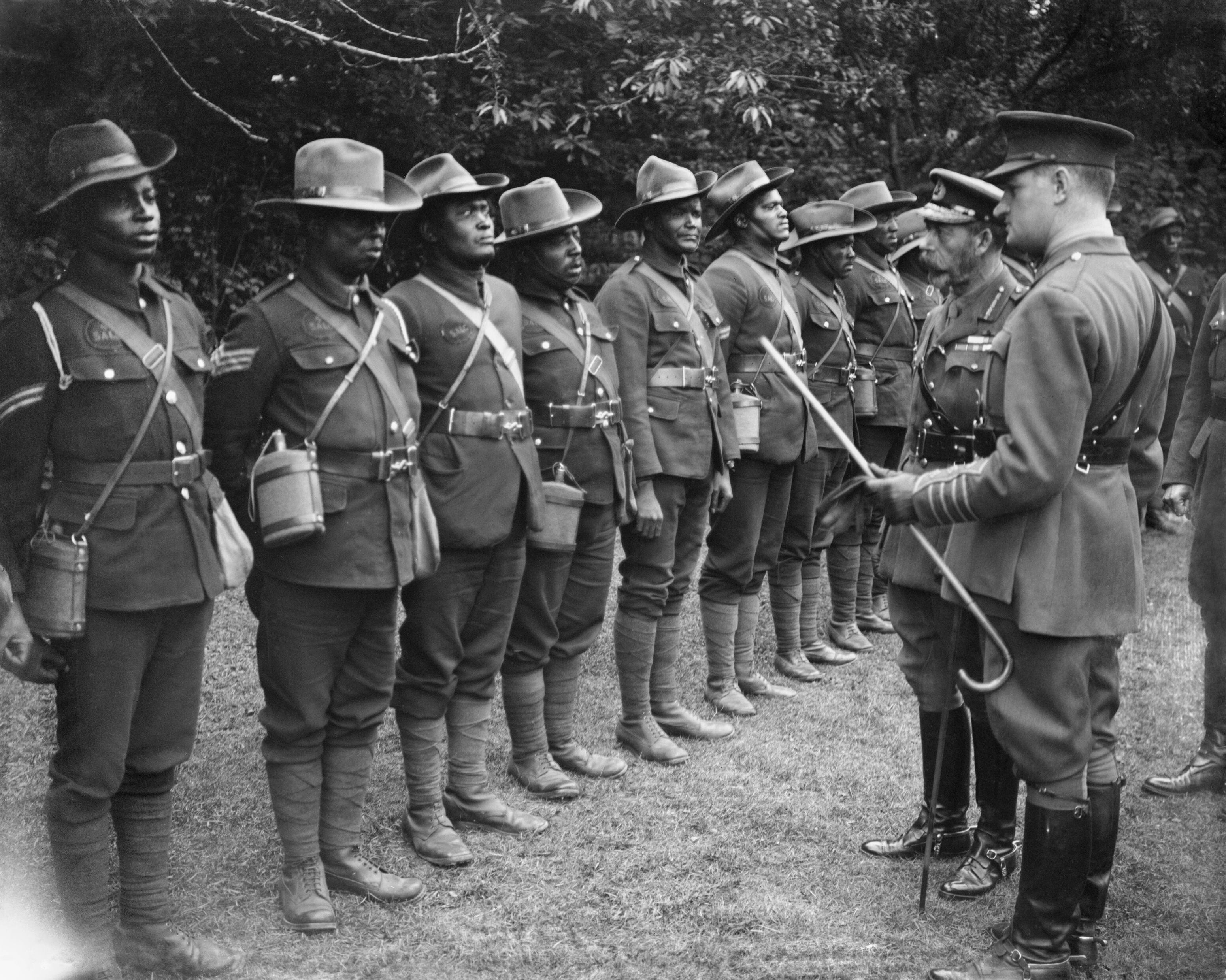
King George V inspecting NCO's of the South African Native Labour Corps at Abbeville, 10 July 1917.

From October 1916, the first continents of the South African Native Labour Corps (SANLC) began arriving in France under the command of Colonel S.A.M Pitchard. Along with other general labour forces, tasks revolved around the construction and maintenance of infrastructure related to the war effort. Employed in French dockyards, railways, quarries and logging camps, the Native Labour Corps often won great praise, even from the Commander in Chief of the British Army Douglas Haigh, for their vital contributions to the war effort. The white officers and NCO rigorously enforced racial segregation during their time in France, minimising European and African contact by operating closed compounds. As dissatisfaction among black Africans grew, a disturbance in July 1917 led to 13 being shot dead by their white officers. British officers increasingly called for black South Africans in France be given more liberties and be allowed more freedoms. On 21 February 1917, a great loss struck South Africa when the troopship SS Mendi was accidentally rammed in thick fog just off the South Coast of England. Transporting 823 men of the Native Labour Corps, 616 South Africans were killed when the cargo ship SS Darro pierced Mendi's starboard quarter when travelling at dangerously high speed through the English Channel. Back in South Africa, the House of Assembly passed a motion of sympathy to the relatives of the dead.

In January 1918, Botha unexpectedly announced that the SANLC would be withdrawn from France and disbanded. Officially, the Government claimed that the Corps was withdrawn due to the threat of enemy submarines to troopships. It is presumed however that having black Africans mixing freely in Europe was becoming too politically embarrassing and risked fomenting African nationalism. Two Cape Corps battalions and the Cape Auxiliary Horse Transport, recruited in June 1916, continued to provide labour in France until late 1919.

For their service in Europe, the Commonwealth War Graves Commission records 1,304 deaths for the South African Native Labour Corps. Along with the sinking of the SS Mendi, over 300 died from medical reasons in France, most likely tuberculosis.

=== Palestine campaign (1917–1918) ===
The SA Field Artillery and the Cape Corps fought in British operations against Turkish forces in Palestine from August 1917 until the end of the war in November 1918. They fought in the battles of Gaza, El Mughar, and Nebi Samwil in 1917; and Tel Asur, Battle of Megiddo 1918, Sharon, and Nablus in 1918.

On 19 April 1918, the first battalion of the South African Cape Corps, which had fought in East Africa, disembarked at Port Suez in Egypt. Assigned to the Egyptian Expeditionary Force (EEF) under General Sir Edmund Allenby, the Corps was originally designated light duties behind the lines, such as a prisoner of war escort, due to South African racial policies. After appeals to Allenby by the Battalion commanding officer, Lieutenant-Colonel Hoy, who requested front line service and highlighted the previous action in East Africa, Allenby accepted the proposal.

By the end of June, the Corps had joined the British and Indian 160th Brigade that had deployed forward positions north of Jerusalem and alongside the Jordan River. The 1918 influenza pandemic began to spread during this time and the Battalion was reduced to around 70% of its normal complement. In late September, the Cape Corps advanced against Turkish positions northeast of Jerusalem that had become slightly weakened due to disease, desertion, and the effects of Allied artillery. Taking Dhib Hill, Chevron Hill, Crest Hill, End Hill and Square Hill, the Battalion was tasked with protecting the right flank of the 160th Brigade from Turkish counterattacks. At Square Hill, the Corps took their objectives for the loss of one dead and one wounded, over 180 Turkish soldiers and one field was captured. As Turkish troops retreated, they regrouped around and defended Kh Jibeit Hill. Although the position could have been easily flanked and isolated, the Battalion was ordered to capture it on 20 September 1918. Intelligence had suggested that, although defended, enemy strength would not be considerable and a strong artillery bombardment of five minutes would suffice.

The attack however did not go to plan from the beginning. The artillery started late and lacked accuracy, giving the Turks valuable time to improve their defences and prepare for an assault. The order to attack, after being delayed, was finally given at 05:00 with the result that the objective would be reached in daylight. Suffering high casualties from machine-gun fire, the attack was broken and dissipated with all officers being killed or wounded. Withdrawing back to Square Hill, the Battalion could only count 360 men fit for duty. 51 were killed, 101 wounded, and one soldier was taken prisoner.

After the offensive against the Ottomans, the Cape Corps was later withdrawn to Alexandria where it suppressed an Egyptian Nationalist uprising, until returning to South Africa in September 1919. For their actions, a Military Cross, and Distinguished Conduct Medal were awarded, along with five soldiers being Mentioned in Despatches. A Square Hill Memorial stands today in Kimberley, Northern Cape.

=== Military contributions and casualties ===
With a population of roughly 6 million, between 1914 – 1918, over 250,000 South Africans of all races voluntarily served their country. It is likely that around 50% of white men of military age served during the war, more than 146,000 whites. 83,000 Blacks and 2,500 Coloureds and Asians also served in either German South-West Africa, East Africa, the Middle East, or on the Western Front in Europe. Over 7,000 South Africans were killed, and nearly 12,000 were wounded during the course of the war. Eight South Africans won the Victoria Cross for gallantry, the Empire's highest and prestigious military medal. The Battle of Delville Wood and the sinking of the SS Mendi being the greatest single incidents of loss of life.

== Disbandment ==
The SAOEF units and formations were disbanded in 1919.

By the end of 1919, the units of the South African Overseas Expeditionary Force had returned to South Africa and were demobilised at camps at Cape Town, Durban, Pretoria and Potchefstroom. A Demobilisation Board and over 50 'Returned Soldiers Committees' were established to help reintegrate white servicemen back into civilian life. Many returned to jobs that had been reserved by their employers, whilst others joined the Allied Expeditionary Force in Russia that was fighting the Bolsheviks, and some became part of the radical mineworkers' movement that led the Rand Rebellion in 1922. Due to South African racial policies, employment support and official gratitude was never given to the Coloured, Black and Indian racial groups that had served.

As there were no formal links between SAOEF units and the Union Defence Forces units which had provided their initial manpower, the SAOEF's war record, including its many honours, was not perpetuated by the UDF (except for the Cape Corps battle honours, which were allowed to the SA Cape Corps Service Battalion formed in 1973).

== See also ==
- Military history of South Africa
- 1st Infantry Brigade (South Africa)
