= 2nd South African Infantry Regiment =

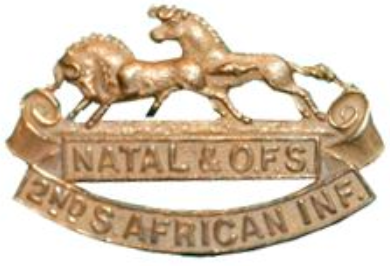
- Regimental collar badge
- Active: 1915–1919
- Country: Union of South Africa
- Allegiance: United Kingdom
- Branch: Army
- Size: Battalion
- Part of: 1st South African Infantry Brigade
- Engagements: World War I

Insignia
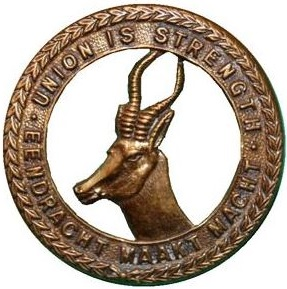
- Cap badge of the 1st SA Infantry Brigade

2nd South African Infantry Regiment (2 SAI) was an infantry regiment of the South African Overseas Expeditionary Force during the First World War.

== History ==
=== Origin ===
The infantry regiments were raised with men from the four provinces of the Union: the 2nd Regiment troops were from Natal and Orange Free State. Many volunteers were from the Kaffrarian Rifles. Most of the recruits already had military training or experience. They were, in general, middle-class, well-educated and well-bred men.

The regiment was led by serving officers of the Union Defence Force, while the whole of 1st South African Brigade part of the South African Overseas Expeditionary Force coming under the command of Brigadier-General Henry Lukin DSO, a previous inspector general of the UDF. The brigade was attached to the 9th (Scottish) Division.

=== Engagements ===
The regiment was deployed to France, where it captured the village of Longueval and was deployed in the adjacent Delville Wood on 15 July 1916. The regiment then served with the brigade at Arras during April 1917 and was part of the offensive at Ypres and Passchendale in September 1917, at Marrieres Wood in March 1918, at Messines in April 1918 and finally at Le Cateau in October 1918.

=== Victoria Cross ===
Lance Corporal W. Hewitt of 2nd SA Infantry won his VC during the third battle of Ypres.

== Leadership ==
The 2nd South African Infantry Regiment commanded by Lt Col W.E.C. Tanner.

Leadership
From	Commanding Officers	To	Ribbon
nd	Lt Col W.E.C. Tanner	nd	
From	Regimental Sergeants Major	To	Ribbon
	No known incumbents		

== Regimental emblems ==
=== Dress Insignia ===
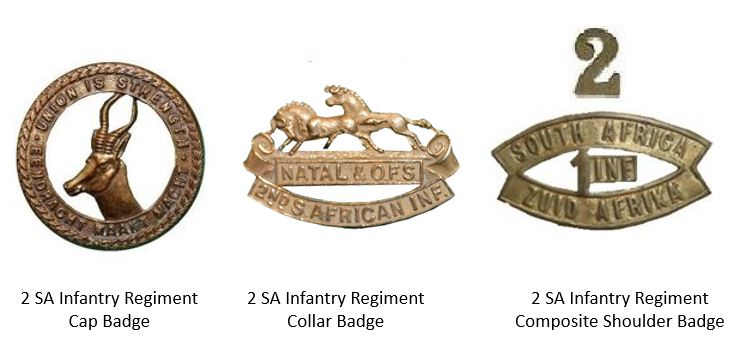
2 SA Infantry Regiment Insignia
