= Claude Mulcahy =

South African cricketer and South African Army officer

Personal information
- Full name: Claude Ludovic Hickman Mulcahy
- Born: 26 June 1886; Little Headington, Oxfordshire, England
- Died: 11 July 1916 (aged 30); Montauban-de-Picardie, Somme, France

Domestic team information
- Years: Team
- 1910/11: Natal

Career statistics
Competition	First-class
Matches	1
Runs scored	2
Batting average	–
100s/50s	0/0
Top score	2*
Balls bowled	54
Wickets	0
Bowling average	–
5 wickets in innings	–
10 wickets in match	–
Best bowling	–
Catches/stumpings	0/–
- Source: Cricinfo, 1 April 2021

Claude Ludovic Hickman Mulcahy (26 June 1886 – 11 July 1916) was an English-born South African first-class cricketer and South African Army officer.

The son of Captain Henry Hickman and Annie Margaret Mulcahy, Mulcahy was born in January 1892 at Little Headington, Oxfordshire. Emigrating to the Colony of Natal as a child, he was educated there at Estcourt High School. He played first-class cricket in South Africa, making a single appearance for Natal in 1911 against Orange Free State at Lord's No. 4 Ground in the Currie Cup. He scored 44 runs in his four matches, with a highest score of 24. He batted once in the match, ending the Natal first innings unbeaten on 2, while with the ball he bowled nine wicketless overs across both Orange Free States innings'.

Mulcahy served in the First World War with the 2nd South African Infantry Regiment, which formed part of the South African Overseas Expeditionary Force. He was promoted to the temporary rank of lieutenant in January 1916, which was antedated to August 1915. Mulcahy was killed in action at Bernafay Wood during the Battle of the Somme on 11 July 1916. He is commemorated at the Corbie Communal Cemetery Extension.
