= 1st SA Infantry Regiment =

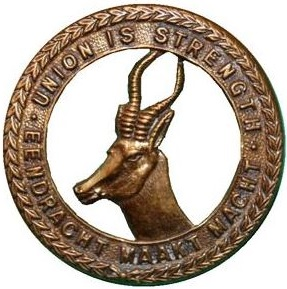
- 1st SA Infantry Regiment
- Active: 1914-1918
- Allegiance: Union of South Africa; Union of South Africa; United Kingdom
- Branch: South African Army
- Size: Battalion
- Part of: South African Infantry Corps
- Battle honours

1st SA Infantry Regiment was an infantry regiment of the South African Army, during World War I.

== History ==
=== Origin ===
The infantry regiments were raised with men from the four provinces of the Union: the 1st Regiment troops were from the Cape. Also known as "The Cape Regiment." A Company (Western Province) was made up from men mostly from the Duke of Edinburgh's Rifles. B. Company was recruited from the Eastern Province and C Company was from Kimberley, with many of the men being ex Kimberley Regiment. D Company was recruited from Cape Town. Most of the recruits already had military training or experience. They were, in general, middle class, well-educated and well-bred men.

The regiment was led by serving officers of the Union Defence Force, while the whole of 1st South African Infantry Brigade came under the command of Brigadier-General Henry Lukin DSO, a previous Inspector General of the UDF and part of the South African Overseas Expeditionary ForceThe Brigade was attached to the 9th (Scottish) Division.

=== Engagements ===
A memorial to the men killed while serving with the 1st South African Infantry Regiment at the Castle of Good Hope

The Regiment was deployed to France where it captured the village of Longueval and was deployed in the adjacent Delville Wood on 15 July 1916. The regiment then served with the Brigade at Arras during April 1917 and was part of the offensive at Ypres and Passchendale in September 1917, at Marrieres Wood in March 1918, at Messines in April 1918 and finally at Le Cateau in October 1918.

=== Victoria Cross ===
Private W. Faulds of 1 SA Infantry won his VC at Delville Wood.

== Leadership ==
The 1st South African Infantry Regiment was commanded by Lt Col F.S. Dawson.

== Regimental emblems ==
=== Dress Insignia ===
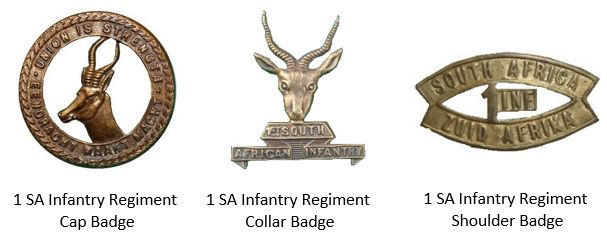
1 SA Infantry Regiment Insignia
