= Union Defence Force (South Africa) =

Military of South Africa from 1912 to 1957

- Unie-Verdedigingsmag (Afrikaans)
- Emblem of the UDF, surmounted by the Tudor Crown

- Ensign of the UDF, from 1947 onwards
- Motto: Unity makes Might (Afrikaans: Eendrag Maak Mag)
- Founded: 1 July 1912
- Disbanded: 1957
- Service branches: South African Army; South African Air Force; South African Navy
- Headquarters: Pretoria, Transvaal, South Africa

Leadership
- Commander-in-Chief: Sovereign of South Africa
- Chief of the UDF: Major General Andries Brink (first); General Stephen Melville (last)

Related articles
- History: World War I Rand Rebellion; World War II; Berlin Blockade; Korean War
- Ranks: South African military ranks

The Union Defence Force (UDF) (Afrikaans: Unie-Verdedigingsmag) comprised the armed forces of South Africa from 1 July 1912, when the Defence Act (No 13 of 1912) took effect, two years after the creation of the Union of South Africa, until 1957 when it was reorganised and renamed the South African Defence Force (SADF).

== History of the UDF ==
=== Establishment ===
After the Union of South Africa was formed in 1910, General Jan Smuts, the Union's first Minister of Defence, placed a high priority on creating a unified military out of the separate armies of the union's four provinces. The South African Defence Act (Act 13 of 1912) made provision for a UDF that would be composed of a Permanent Force (or standing army) of career soldiers, an Active Citizen Force (ACF) of temporary conscripts, a Coast Garrison Force and the Royal Naval Volunteer Reserve (South African Division) (RNVR(SA)), as well as any other defence arm that might in future be established to meet the defence requirements of the Union of South Africa. The 1912 law also obligated all white males between seventeen and sixty years of age to serve in the military, but this was not strictly enforced as there were a large number of volunteers. Instead, half of the white males aged from 17 to 25 were drafted by lots into the ACF.

=== Permanent Force ===
Initially, the Permanent Force consisted of five regular mounted regiments and a small artillery section as well as a headquarters, instructional and administrative staff. Provision was also made for a Coastal Defence Corps, South African Aviation Corps (SAAC) – part of the ACF and School Cadet Corps. No provision was made for an overall commander, instead the commanders of the Citizen Force, Cadet Corps and Permanent Force reported directly to the Minister of Defence.

=== Headquarters ===
On 1 July 1912 the Headquarters of the UDF was established in Pretoria. Headquarters comprised three sections: Secretariat, General Staff and an Administrative section. A Medical Services Section was added in December 1913, and during 1916 the Administrative Section became the Quartermaster-General's Section.

Brigadier General Christian Frederick Beyers was appointed Commandant General of the Citizen Force, Brigadier General Henry Lukin became Inspector General of the Permanent Force and Colonel Percival Scott Beves became Commandant of Cadets. They reported directly to the Minister of Defence.

C.F. Beyers resigned his post in September 1914 and the role was taken over by the Minister of Defence

The titles of the officers in charge of these sections were changed on 1 July 1915. The Head of the General Staff became Chief Staff Officer, General Staff and Adjutant-General. The Head of the Administrative section became Quartermaster General. In July 1917 the General Staff post was again renamed to Chief of the General Staff and Adjutant-General.

In May 1918 the co-ordination of all military staff work at HQ and the issue of all military orders was vested in the Chief of the General Staff, as well as the responsibilities of Commandant of Cadets and the role of Adjutant-General was split off. There were 4 sections under the CGS – General Staff section, Adjudant General, Medical Services and Quartermaster General. Andries Brink was appointed Chief of the General Staff in 1920. The posts of Chief of the General Staff and Secretary of Defence were combined on 30 September 1922, following the retirement of Sir Roland Bourne

=== Creation of the Services ===
The South African Army was created first by merging the existing military structures of the former British colonies and Boer Republics that had become the four provinces of the Union. The formation of the South African Air Force followed in 1920. The South African Naval Service was created in 1922, following the donation of HMS Thames which became the South African Training Ship General Botha.

=== 1922 re-organisation ===
The SA Defence Act Amendment Act, No. 22 of 1922 re-organised the Permanent Force. From 1 February 1923 the Permanent Force consisted of the Staff Corps, Instructional Corps, Naval Service, Field Artillery, 1st Regiment, Mounted Riflemen, the Permanent Garrison Artillery, the Engineer Corps, the Air Force, SA Service Corps, SA Medical Corps, Ordnance Corps, Veterinary Corps and the Administrative, Pay and Clerical Corps.

=== 1926 to 1934 ===
To save money another reorganisation took place in 1926. The last regiment of the SA Mounted Riflemen was disbanded as was the Brigade HQ of the SA Field Artillery. The Great Depression put pressure on the Budget and 56 Citizen Force units were disbanded and the number of military districts was reduced from 16 to 6 The Special Service Battalion was started as a way of creating work for young people who could not find employment. A drastic move was the disbanding of the Naval Service

In 1933 Oswald Pirow became Minister of Defence, General Brink was appointed General Officer Commanding the UDF as well as the Secretary of Defence and Pierre van Ryneveld became Chief of the General Staff. In addition the 6 military districts were redesignated "Commands".

=== Pirow's Five Year expansion plan ===
As the economy improved Minister Pirow put forward a plan to expand and reorganise the Defence Force. The Air Force would be increased to 7 squadrons, with new bases being built at Waterkloof, Bloemfontein, Durban and Youngsfield. However, by the start of World War II this had not materialised. The Active Citizen Force units would increase from 8 to 24, 12 based in urban areas and 12 based in the countryside

== Wars and other actions ==
In 1913 and 1914, the new 23,400-member Citizen Force was called on to suppress several industrial strikes on the Witwatersrand. The UDF participated in the First World War, The Second World War, the Berlin Airlift and the Korean War.

== World War I ==
The Union Defence Force saw action in a number areas in the First World War. In Africa, the Army invaded German South-West Africa, later known as South West Africa, and now known as Namibia. The South Africans expelled German forces and gained control of the German colony. As part of the Allies' East African Campaign an expedition under General Jan Smuts was dispatched to German East Africa (later known as Tanganyika). The objective was to fight German forces in that colony and to try to capture the elusive German General Paul Erich von Lettow-Vorbeck. Ultimately, Lettow-Vorbeck fought his tiny force out of German East Africa into Portuguese Mozambique and then Northern Rhodesia, where he accepted a cease-fire three days after the end of the war.

In Europe the 1st South African Infantry Brigade were shipped to France to fight on the Western Front. In addition to 5 batteries of Heavy Artillery, a Field Ambulance, a Royal Engineers Signal Company and a General Hospital were raised and sent to the front. The Battle of Delville Wood in 1916 was the most costly battle fought by the South African Overseas Expeditionary Force.

South Africans also saw action in the Middle East, with the Cape Corps deploying as part of the Egyptian Expeditionary Force in Palestine.

=== Military contributions and casualties ===
With a population of roughly 6 million, between 1914 - 1918, over 250,000 South Africans of all races voluntarily served their country. It is likely that around 50% of white men of military age served during the war, more than 146,000 whites. 83,000 Blacks and 2,500 Coloureds and Asians also served in either German South West Africa, East Africa, the Middle East, or on the Western Front in Europe. Over 7,000 South Africans were killed, and nearly 12,000 were wounded during the course of the war. Eight South Africans won the Victoria Cross for gallantry, the Empire's highest and prestigious military medal. The Battle of Delville Wood and the sinking of the SS Mendi being the greatest single incidents of loss of life.

== World War II ==
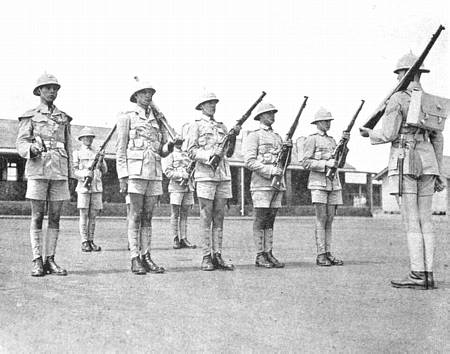
Union Defence Force infantry on parade, c. 1939.

South Africa and its military forces contributed in many theaters of war. South Africa's contribution consisted mainly of supplying troops, airmen and material for the North African campaign (the Desert War) and the Italian Campaign as well as to Allied ships that docked at its crucial ports adjoining the Atlantic Ocean and Indian Ocean that converge at the tip of Southern Africa. Numerous volunteers also flew for the Royal Air Force.

- The South African Army and Air Force played a major role in defeating the Italian forces of Benito Mussolini during the 1940/1941 East Africa Campaign. The converted Junkers Ju 86s of 12 Squadron, South African Air Force, carried out the first bombing raid of the campaign on a concentration of tanks at Moyale at 8am on 11 June 1940, mere hours after Italy's declaration of war.
- Another important victory that the South Africans participated in was the liberation of Madagascar from the control of the Vichy French who were allies of the Nazis. British troops aided by South African soldiers, staged their attack from South Africa, landing on the strategic island on 4 May 1942 to preclude its seizure by the Japanese.
- The South African 1st Infantry Division took part in several actions in North Africa in 1941 and 1942, including the Battle of El Alamein, before being withdrawn to South Africa to be re-constituted as an armoured division.
- The South African 2nd Infantry Division also took part in a number of actions in North Africa during 1942, but on 21 June 1942 two complete infantry brigades of the division as well as most of the supporting units were captured at the fall of Tobruk.
- The South African 3rd Infantry Division never took an active part in any battles but instead organised and trained the South African home defence forces, performed garrison duties and supplied replacements for the South African 1st Infantry Division and the South African 2nd Infantry Division. However, one of this division's constituent brigades – 7 SA Motorised Brigade – did take part in the invasion of Madagascar in 1942.
- The South African 6th Armoured Division fought in numerous actions in Italy in 1944–1945.
- The South African Air Force made a significant contribution to the air war in East Africa, North Africa, Sicily, Italy, the Balkans and even as far east as bombing missions aimed at the Romanian oilfields in Ploiești, supply missions in support of the Warsaw Uprising and reconnaissance missions ahead of the Soviet advances in the Lvov-Cracow area.
- Numerous South African airmen also volunteered service to the Royal Air Force, some serving with distinction.
- South Africa contributed to the war effort against Japan, supplying men and manning ships in naval engagements against the Japanese.

Of the 334,000 men volunteered for full-time service in the South African Army during the war (including some 211,000 whites, 77,000 blacks and 46,000 coloureds and Indians), nearly 9,000 were killed in action.

== Korean War ==
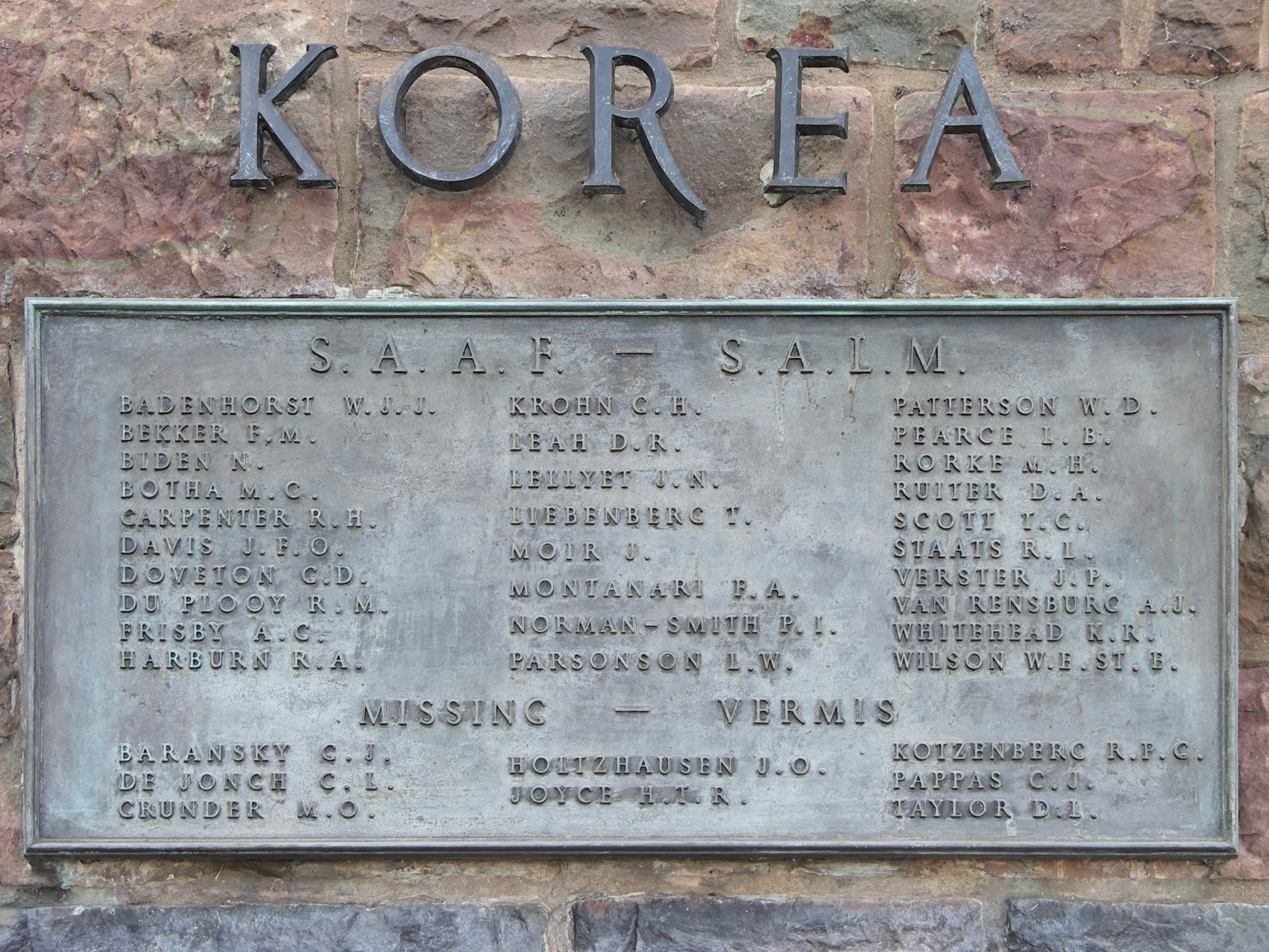
The names of those who died and are listed as missing can be found on the Memorial plaque in the gardens of the Union Buildings in Pretoria.

In the 1950s, 2 Squadron ("The Flying Cheetahs") of the SAAF served as South Africa's primary contribution to the United Nations Command. Over 200 officers and some 545 airmen in the South African Air Force saw action over Korea between 1950 and 1953. Also represented were 38 different ranks from other branches of the UDF.

South Africa suffered 34 dead or missing in action during the Korean War. Eight pilots either shot down by communist forces or forced to land their aircraft behind enemy lines were taken prisoner.

== See also ==
- Military history of South Africa
- Military history of South Africa during World War I
- South African Overseas Expeditionary Force (World War I)
- Military history of South Africa during World War II
- South African Air Force
- South African Navy
- 2 Squadron SAAF § Korean War
- List of South African military chiefs § Chief of the UDF
