= Delville Wood South African National Memorial =

World War I memorial in Somme, France

- Commonwealth War Graves Commission
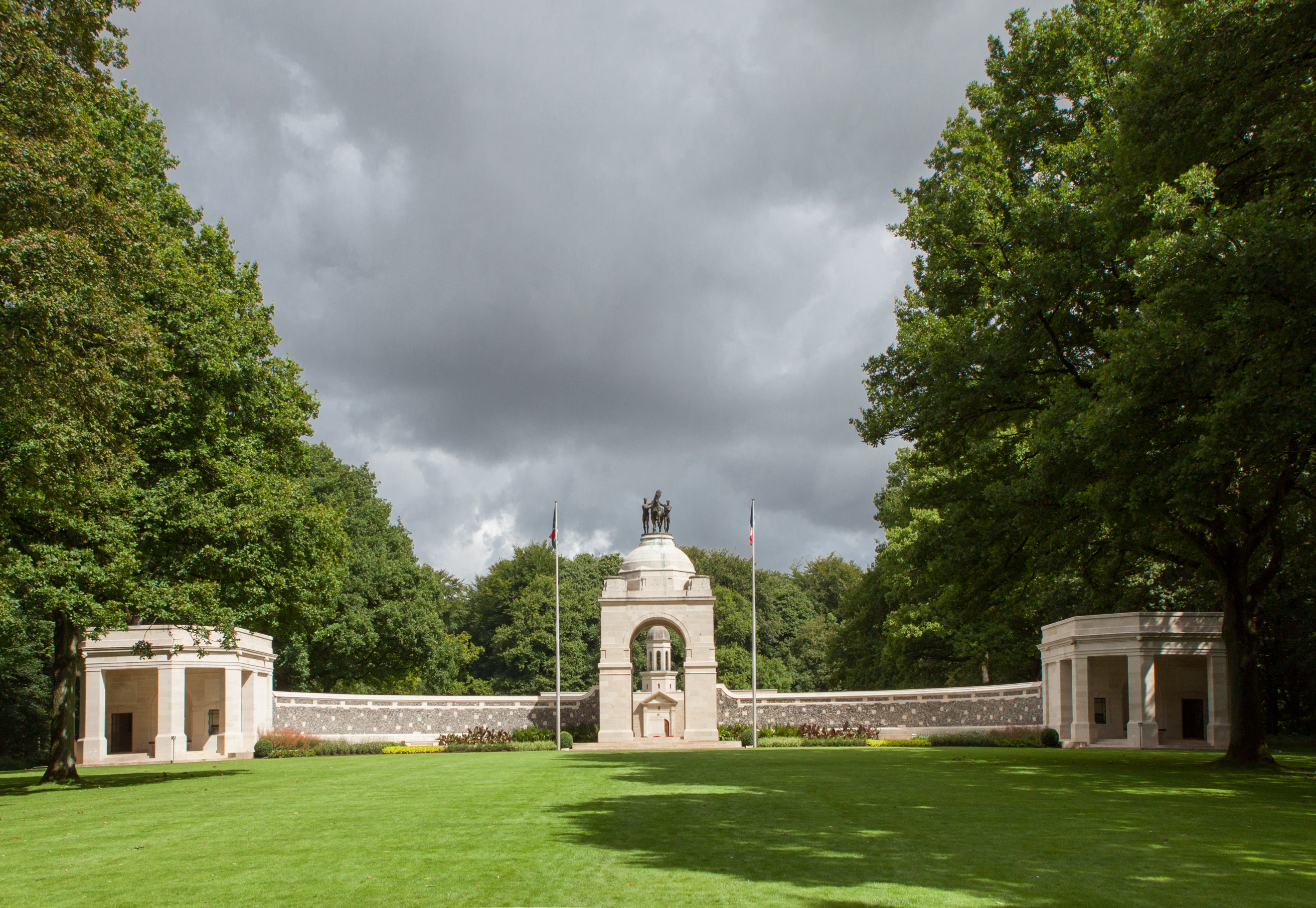
- View of the memorial from the front
- For South African Overseas Expeditionary Force
- Unveiled: 10 October 1926
- Location: 50°01′30.50″N 02°48′45.36″E
- Designed by: Sir Herbert Baker (architect); Alfred Turner (sculptor)
- English: To the Immortal Dead from South Africa, who at the call of Duty made the Great Sacrifice on the battlefields of Africa, Asia and Europe and on the Sea, this memorial is dedicated in proud and grateful recognition by their countrymen. Afrikaans: Aan die onsterflike, Suid-Afrikaners wat op die Slagvelde van Afrika, Asië, en Europa en op See die Groot Offer op die Altaar van Plig gelê het, is hierdie Gedenkteken deur hul landgenote in trotse en dankbare herinnering gewy.

UNESCO World Heritage Site
- Official name: Funerary and memory sites of the First World War (Western Front)
- Type: Cultural
- Criteria: i, ii, vi
- Designated: 2023 (45th session)
- Reference no.: 1567-SE05

The Delville Wood South African National Memorial is a World War I memorial, located in Delville Wood, near the commune of Longueval, in the Somme department of France. It is opposite the Delville Wood Commonwealth War Graves Commission Cemetery, on the other side of the Longueval–Ginchy road.

== Memorial development and inauguration ==
=== Land acquisition ===
Following the war, Delville Wood was purchased by the author and politician Sir Percy Fitzpatrick, and presented to South Africa. This was followed by the standard French policy of repurchasing the land for one franc and granting South Africa the land in perpetuity for memorial purposes. The memorial was funded by public subscription. Among those involved in organising the memorial was General Henry Lukin, who was appointed Deputy Chair of the Delville Wood Memorial Committee in July 1921.

=== Description ===
The memorial was designed by Sir Herbert Baker, assistant architect was Arthur James Scott Hutton, with a sculpture by Alfred Turner. It consists of a flint and stone screen either side of an archway, with a shelter at each end of the screen. On top of the arch is Turner's bronze statue of two men and a war horse. The two male figures, symbolising Castor and Pollux, represent the two white races of South Africa (British and Afrikaans). The main inscriptions are in both English and Afrikaans. Other inscriptions include the location of the South African campaigns (France, Flanders, West Africa, Central Africa, East Africa, Egypt, Palestine, the Sea). On the archway are the following shorter inscriptions, again in English and Afrikaans:

Their ideal is our legacy.
Their Sacrifice our Inspiration.

The Afrikaans-equivalent inscription reads: Vir ons is hul ideaal 'n erfenis, hul offer 'n besieling. Above these inscriptions, on the very top part of the archway, is carved the French phrase "AUX MORTS", signifying that this is a monument to the dead.

Sir Herbert Baker's involvement was as a tribute to his cousin, Lance Corporal Clifford Baker, who died 14 days after being wounded while helping Private William Faulds rescue a wounded Lieutenant Arthur Craig from open ground, a rescue which resulted in Faulds being awarded the Victoria Cross.

=== Unveiling ===
The memorial was unveiled on 10 October 1926, by the widow of General Louis Botha. Also present were General J. B. M. Hertzog, the Prime Minister of the Union of South Africa; Sir Percy Fitzpatrick; Field-Marshal Earl Haig; and Lukin's widow. The former Governor-General of South Africa, and member of the British Royal Family, Prince Arthur of Connaught was present, and representing the British Army was Brigadier General W. E. C. Tanner. The religious ceremony, which included the consecration of the nearby cemetery, was jointly conducted by the Right Reverend Dr Furse, Bishop of St Albans, and the Reverend Dr. Van de Merwe, Moderator of the Dutch Reformed Church. Representing the French Army's Marshal Joffre was General Barbier. Others present were the Marquess of Crewe (British Ambassador to France), Leo Amery (Secretary of State for the Dominions), and the Prefect of the Département of the Somme. Also present were troops, veterans, and representatives of the British Legion and other veteran associations. Over 1,200 people paid their respects at the unveiling ceremony, and Sir Percy Fitzpatrick read out a message from Edward, Prince of Wales. Speeches were also made by Earl Haig, General Barbier, and General Hertzog.

The Cenotaph, Johannesburg was dedicated by Governor-General Alexander Cambridge, 1st Earl of Athlone on 10 October 1926 in a ceremony held simultaneously with that at Delville Wood.

== Commemoration ==
=== To all South African forces of World War I ===
This memorial also serves as the national memorial to all those of the South African Overseas Expeditionary Force who died during World War I. A total of some 229,000 officers and men served in the forces of South Africa in the war. Of these, some 10,000 died in action or through injury and sickness, and their names are written in a memorial register that was kept at this memorial, and is now kept at the nearby museum.

The campaigns commemorated here include the East African Campaign and other campaigns outside the Western Front, but the location of the memorial marks the role played by South African forces in the Battle of Delville Wood (part of the Somme Offensive), the first action seen by the forces of South Africa in Flanders and France. Other battles commemorated here, include the participation of South African forces at the Battle of Arras and the Battle of Passchendaele. Later in the war, South African forces fought a rearguard action at Gauche Wood and Marrieres Wood during the German spring offensive, and held their position at Messines Ridge. During the Advance to Victory, they fought at the Battle of Beaurevoir and at Le Cateau, and were "furthest East of all the British troops in France" when the Armistice was declared.

=== Addition of inscribed names ===
Inscribed names have been added. However, unlike the other national memorials to the missing raised to commemorate the part played by Dominion forces on the Western Front in World War I, this memorial originally had no names inscribed on it. Instead, the names of the missing dead of South Africa were inscribed on the battlefield memorials to the missing, along with those of the dead of the United Kingdom.

== Replicas ==
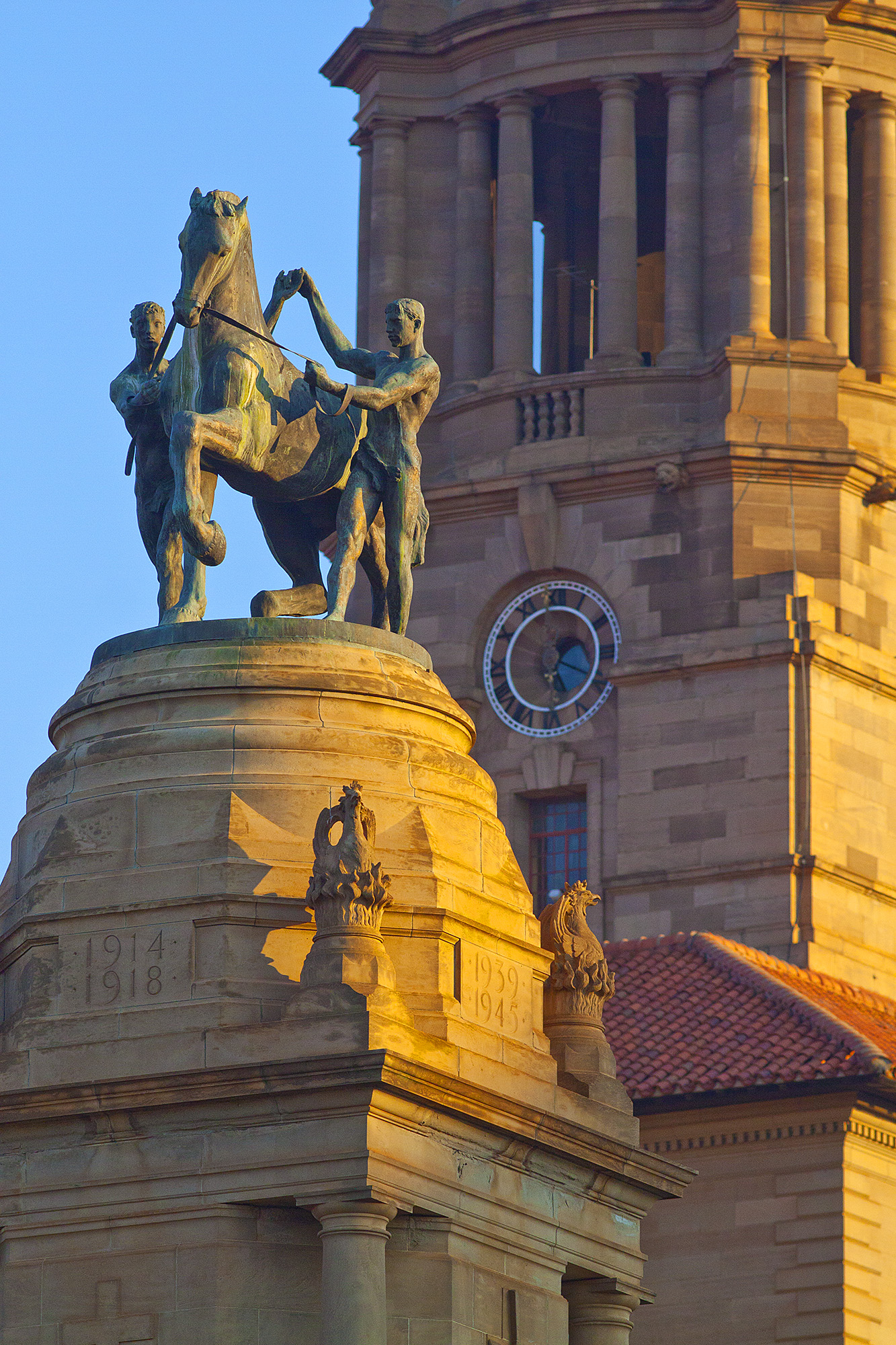
Pretoria War Memorial, showing Union Buildings in the background

Two replicas of the memorial were made, both in South Africa; one in the Union Buildings in Pretoria, and one in Cape Town.

An altar stone in the style of a Stone of Remembrance was unveiled in front of the archway in 1952, to commemorate the South African dead of World War II. This unveiling was performed by the mother of Major Edwin Swales, recipient of the Victoria Cross.

The inscription on the altar stone reads:

“This altar stone has been erected by the government of the Union of South Africa to commemorate the sacrifices of all South Africans who gave their lives in all theatres of war on land on the sea in the air in the World War of 1939–1945. Unveiled 5th June 1952.

In 1986, the South African Commemorative Museum, a five-pointed star-shaped building located behind the memorial, was unveiled by P. W. Botha, the president of the Republic of South Africa.
