= Jacob van Deventer (general) =

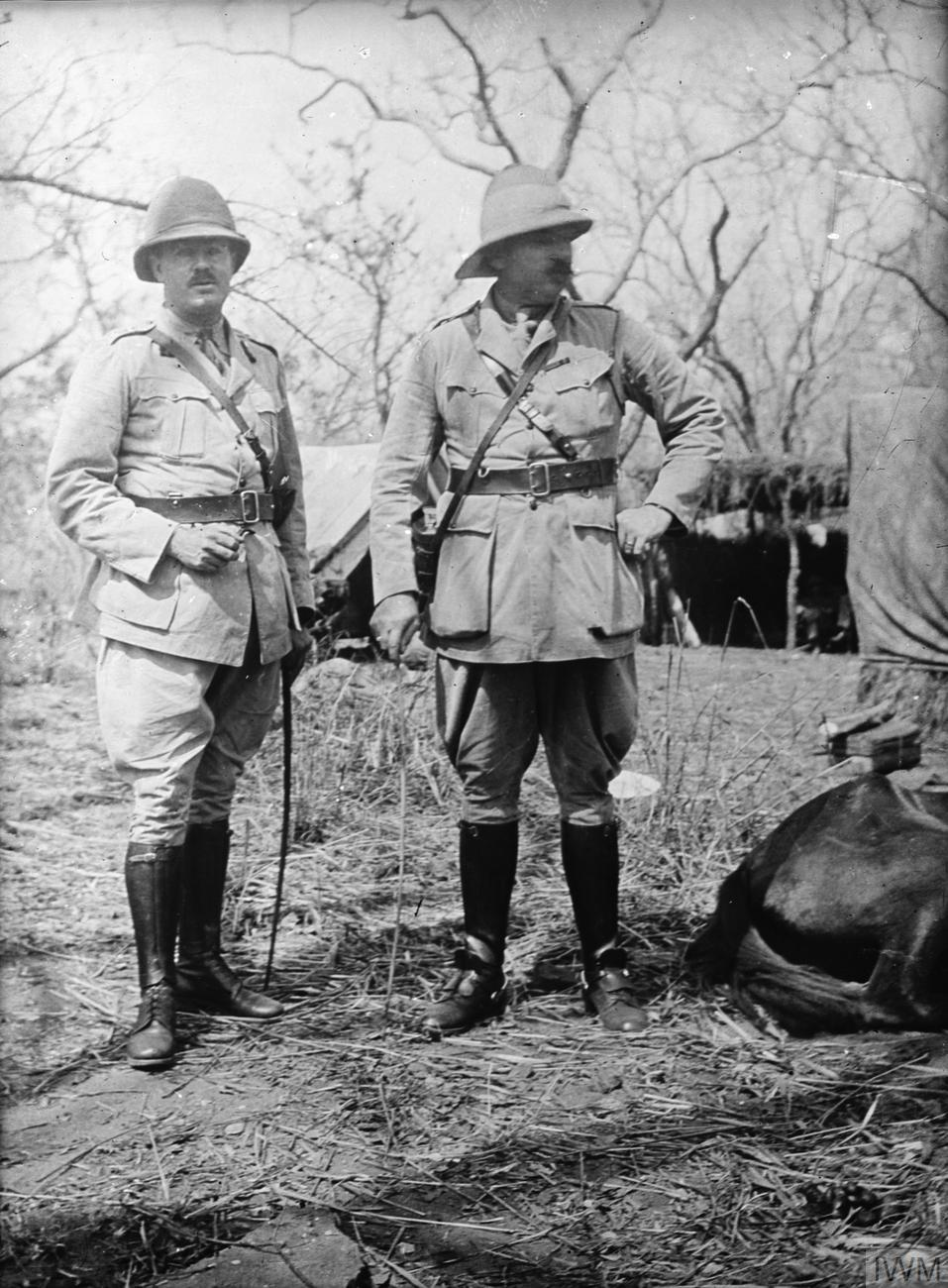
- Van Deventer (right) with his chief-of-staff Brigadier Seymour Hulbert Sheppard in c. 1917
- Born: July 18, 1874; Ficksburg
- Died: August 17, 1922 (aged 48)
- Occupations: Military personnel; Writer

Lieutenant-General Sir Jacob Louis van Deventer, KCB, CMG, DTD (18 July 1874 – 17 August 1922) was a South African military officer.

Van Deventer was born in Ficksburg, Orange Free State. He began his military career in the South African Republic's army in Pretoria on 21 February 1896, and fought in the Second Boer War. Van Deventer was physically a very big man who was almost two metres tall. A serious wound at the end of the war affected his ability to speak. Van Deventer was skilled at guerrilla tactics.

He returned to military service in World War I, and commanded a Union Defence Forces formation in the South West Africa campaign. In the East African campaign, van Deventer commanded a South African Overseas Expeditionary Force mounted brigade, then a division, and finally from 1917 to 1918 all British imperial forces in the region (though, allegedly, he could hardly speak English). Van Deventer was knighted twice for his services.

After the war, he was a part-time inspecting officer. Van Deventer was made a Grand Officer of the Portuguese Order of Aviz in 1921. In 1922, he commanded a mounted brigade in operations to crush the Rand Rebellion on the Witwatersrand. Van Deventer married Maria Cornelia Snyman, born 5 May 1890. He died in Pretoria on 17 August 1922.
