= Citizen Force (South Africa) =

Former reserve component of the South African military

The Citizen Force (Afrikaans: Burgermag) was a reserve component of the South African armed forces. It was established during the formation of the Union Defence Force (UDF) and reflected the UDF's mixed traditions, which drew on both the British model of a standing professional army as well as the Afrikaner model of a large citizen militia. The South African Defence Act (No. 13) of 1912 dictated that the UDF include a Permanent Force of career soldiers and a "Citizen Force" of volunteer reservists or conscripts mobilised during temporary crises.

Prior to World War II, the Citizen Force consisted of a general manpower pool of white South African civilians who had received some military training in the past. They were periodically retrained for deployment in the event that they were mobilised for active service. The UDF had few professional career soldiers during the 1930s, so the bulk of its active manpower at any one time was vested in the Citizen Force. This was considered adequate for South Africa's defence requirements, as the country was far removed from potentially hostile forces in Europe and neighbouring territories represented no military threat.

The Citizen Force was retained in the restructured South African Defence Force (SADF) after the UDF was disestablished in the late 1950s. White South Africans completing their national service were automatically enrolled in the Citizen Force for five years, being expected to serve at least nineteen days a year. In 1977 this was increased to thirty days a year for an eight-year period. Thereafter they were considered part of the Citizen Force Reserve for another five years, and could still be called into military service if their skills were needed.

The Citizen Force was made up wholly of white South African men until 1978, at which time Coloured South Africans who had previously served in the Cape Corps were enlisted in the Citizen Force as well. The first Coloured Citizen Force officers were commissioned in October 1978.

By the late 1980s, the Citizen Force accounted for 68% of the SADF's total manpower. No black South Africans were enlisted in the Citizen Force, as the majority of the SADF's black recruits were professional soldiers and they lacked the part-time military tradition of the country's white community. In 1988 the racial composition of the Citizen Force was 96.3% white and 3.7% Coloured.

The South African military establishment underwent another major restructuring process in 1994 with the formation of the South African National Defence Force (SANDF). The retention of preexisting Citizen Force units was favoured by the SANDF because they worked well with the new force design and structure placing an emphasis on domestic defence. Additionally, as a reserve formation the Citizen Force was seen as cost-effective. It was renamed the SANDF Conventional Reserve at some point between 1994 and 2003.

== See also ==
- Permanent Force
- Conscription in South Africa
