= 4th SA Infantry Regiment =

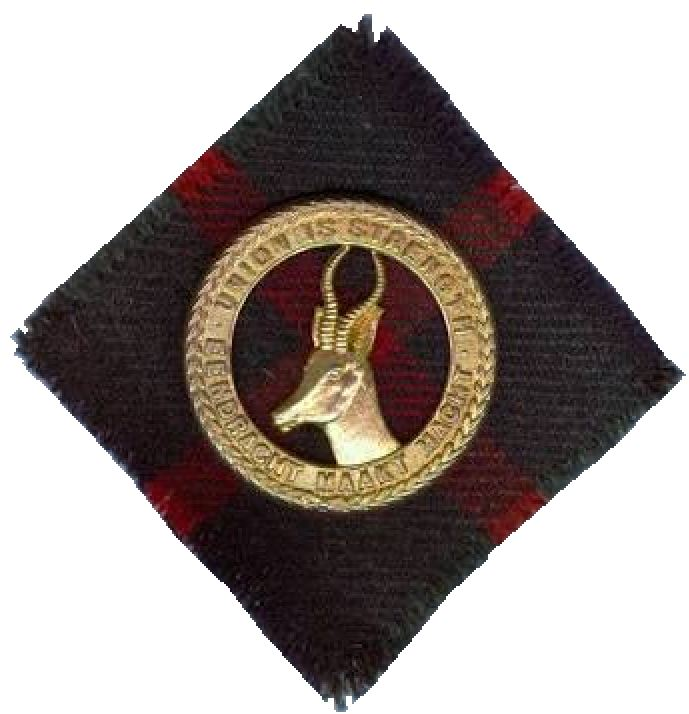
- 4th SA Infantry Regiment Cap badge
- Active: 1914-1918
- Allegiance: Union of South Africa; United Kingdom
- Branch: South African Army
- Size: Regiment
- Part of: South African Infantry Corps
- Motto: "Mors Lucrum Mihi" (Death is my reward)
- Battle honours

4th SA Infantry Regiment was an infantry regiment of the South African Army, during World War One.

== History ==
=== Origin ===
To join the British Imperial Forces for the war in Europe, the South African Infantry Regiment was raised (also known as the South African Scottish) because the 1912 Defence Act restricted its Active Defence Force from operating outside South Africa.

=== Volunteers ===
The regiment's companies were formed from volunteers from various units:

- A Company mainly from volunteers of the Cape Town Highlanders Regiment.
- B Company, mainly from volunteers of the Transvaal Scottish Regiment's 1st Battalion.
- C Company, mainly from volunteers of the Transvaal Scottish Regiment's 2nd Battalion and
- D Company from Caledonian Societies of the Free State and Natal.

Totalling 160 officers and, 5648 other ranks, the regiment embarked for England from Cape Town and were quartered at Bordon in Hampshire for about two months for refresher training.

=== Command ===
The 4th SA Infantry Regiment and the larger South African Brigade initially served with the British 9th (Scottish) Division. Following the Brigades' decimation in March 1918, it was reconstituted and incorporated in September into the 66th (2nd East Lancashire) Division until the end of the War.

=== Engagements ===
After a short campaign in North Africa against a Turkish attack on the Suez Canal the SA Scottish were sent to France. Here they took part in the Battle of Delville Wood as part of the battle of the Somme in 1916. Between 12 and 19 July, the total casualty rate was about 74% of those who went into action. By the end of July, the SA Scottish had suffered 868 casualties. After Delville Wood, the shattered SA Scottish were reformed and served on the Western Front in particular at Vimy Ridge, the Somme, the battle of Passchendaele, Marrieres Wood, and the battle of Messines.

== Leadership ==
Lt Colonel F.A. Jones, DSO

== Regimental emblems ==
The regiments collar badge were identical to those of the Cape Town Highlanders except they bore a different motto in Latin "Mors Lucrum Mihi" (Death is my reward) which was the family motto of the Regiments Commanding Officer, Lt Colonel F.A. Jones. The regiment was a kilted unit, wearing the Murray of Athol tartan.

=== Dress Insignia ===
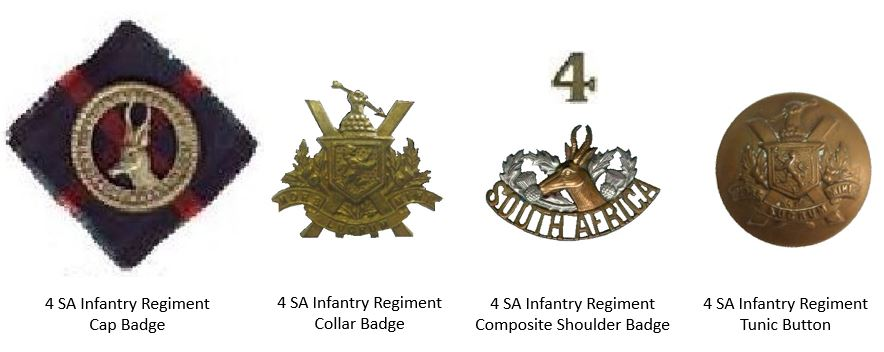
4 SA Infantry Regiment Insignia
