= William Faulds =

Recipient of the Victoria Cross

William Faulds VC MC
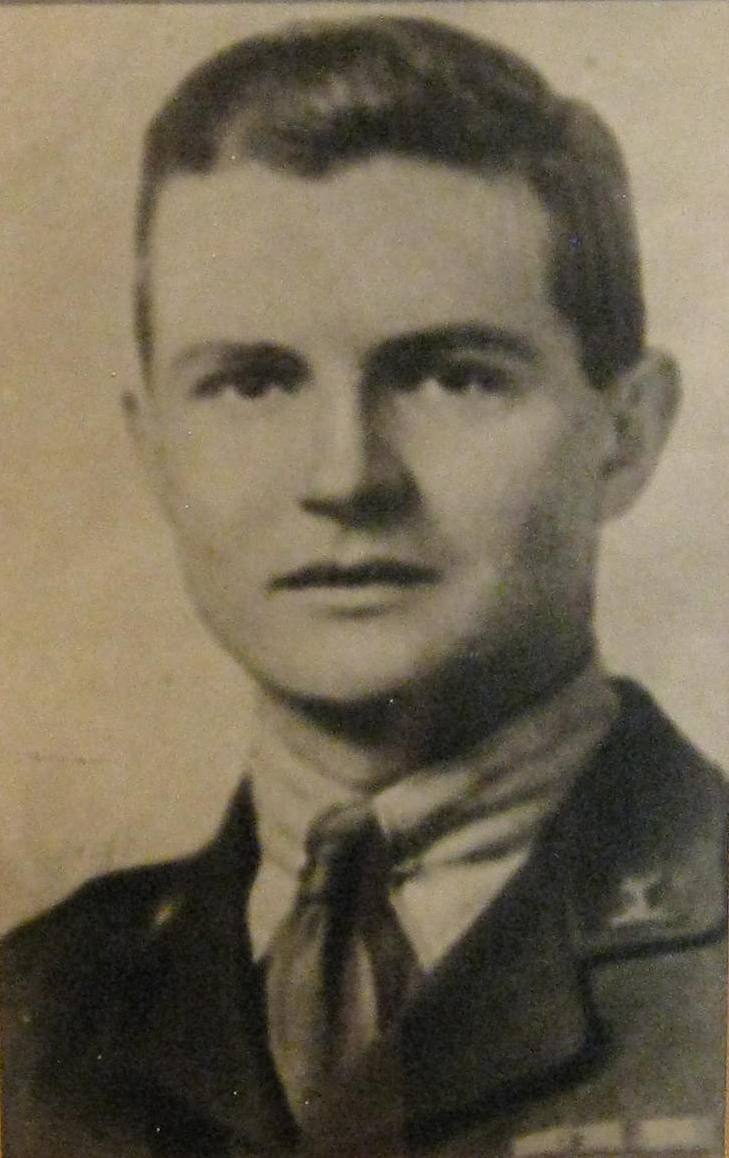
- Born: 19 February 1895; Cradock, Cape Colony
- Died: 16 February 1950 (aged 54); Salisbury, Rhodesia
- Burial place: Pioneer Cemetery, Harare
- Military career
- Allegiance: Union of South Africa
- Branch: 1st South African Brigade
- Rank: Captain (Private when cited for award)
- Units: 1st Battalion (also known as "Cape Battalion")
- Conflicts: First World War: Battle of Agagia, Egypt 1916; Battle of the Somme 1916: Delville Wood; Battle of Arras 1917; Battle of Ypres 1917; Kemmel 1918; Hindenburg Line 1918; Cambrai 1918; Second World War
- Awards: Victoria Cross; Military Cross; 1914-1915 Star; British War Medal 1914-1920; Allied Victory Medal 1914-1918 (South African issue); 1939-1945 Star; Africa Star; Defence Medal 1939-1945; War Medal 1939-1945; Africa Service Medal; King George VI Coronation Medal 1937

William Frederick Faulds VC MC (19 February 1895 – 16 February 1950) was a South African soldier, and recipient of the Victoria Cross, the highest and most prestigious award for gallantry in the face of the enemy that can be awarded to British and Commonwealth forces. He was the first South African-born man serving with South African Forces to be awarded the VC.

Faulds was born 19 February 1895. When he was 21 years old, and a private in 1st Regiment, 1st South African Infantry Brigade during the First World War, he was awarded the Victoria Cross for his actions on 18 July 1916 at Delville Wood, France.

The citation reads as follows:

For most conspicuous bravery and devotion to duty. A bombing party under Lieut. Craig attempted to rush across 40 yards of ground which lay between the British and enemy trenches. Coming under very heavy rifle and machine gun fire the officer and the majority of the party were killed or wounded.

Unable to move, Lieut. Craig lay midway between the two lines of trench, the ground being quite open.

"In full daylight Pte. Faulds, accompanied by two other men, climbed over the parapet, ran out, picked up the officer, and carried him back, one man being severely wounded in so doing.

Two days later Private Faulds again showed most conspicuous bravery in going out alone to bring in a wounded man, and carrying him nearly half a mile to a dressing-station, subsequently rejoining his platoon. The artillery fire was at the time so intense that stretcher-bearers and others considered that any attempt to bring in the wounded men meant certain death. This risk Private Faulds faced unflinchingly, and his bravery was crowned with success.

As a temporary Lieutenant, Faulds was also awarded the Military Cross for actions at Hedicourton 22 March 1918. This citation, for the Military Cross reads:

In the retirement from the line east of Hendicourt, 22 March 1918, he was commanding one of the platoons which formed the rear-guard. He handled his men most ably, and exposed himself freely. Though the enemy pressed hard, he, by his fearless and able leadership, checked them, and enabled the remainder of the battalion to withdraw with slight loss.

He later achieved the rank of captain. He served in the Second World War in Italian Somaliland and Abyssinia with Rhodesian forces. He died 16 February 1950 and was buried in Pioneer Cemetery, Harare, Zimbabwe.

Other medals awarded to Faulds were the 1914-1915 Star, the British War Medal 1914-1920, the Allied Victory Medal 1914-1918 (South African issue), the 1939-1945 Star, the Africa Star, the Defence Medal 1939-1945, the War Medal 1939-1945, the Africa Service Medal and the King George VI Coronation Medal 1937.

== The Medal ==
His Victoria Cross was displayed at the National Museum of Military History in Johannesburg. This Victoria Cross and his other medals were stolen off a display in 1994 and are still missing.

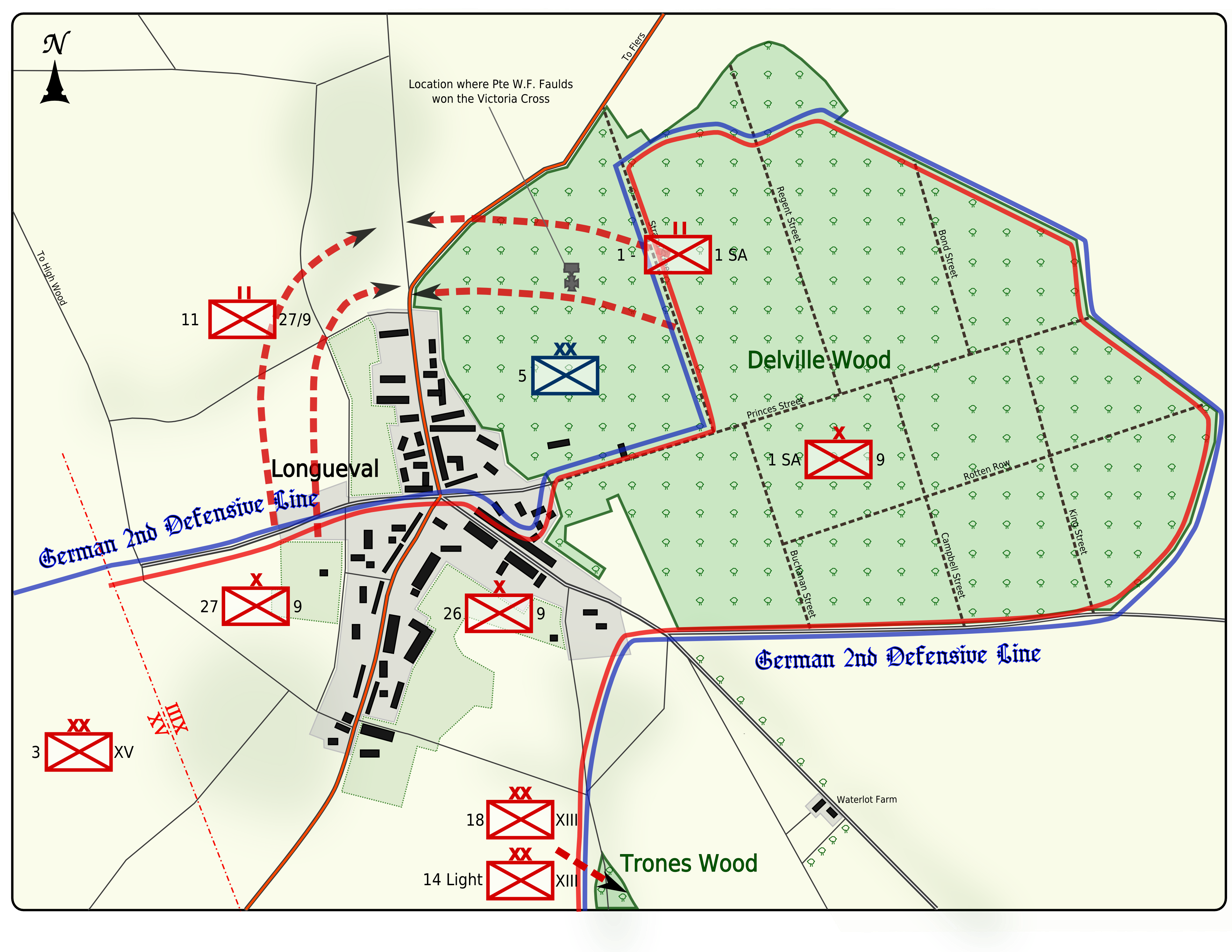
Depiction of the action during which Pte Faulds was cited for the Victoria Cross. Refer Battle of Delville Wood

The insurance money from the loss of the medals contributed to the building of the Capt W F Faulds VC MC Centre at the museum; the Centre consists of conference and function facilities.
