= Andries Brink =

Andries Jacob Eksteen Brink, CBE, DTD, DSO
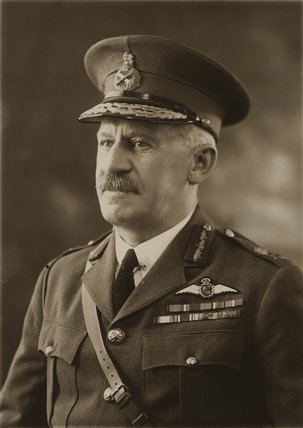
- Born: 21 July 1877; Somerset West, Cape Colony
- Died: 17 October 1947 (aged 70); Pretoria, Union of South Africa
- Military career
- Allegiance: South Africa
- Branch: South African Army
- Rank: Lieutenant General
- Commands: Burgher Commandos; Chief of the General Staff of the Union Defence Force
- Conflicts: Second Boer War; First World War; Second World War
- Awards: Commander of the Order of the British Empire; Dekoratie voor Trouwe Dienst; Distinguished Service Order; Mentioned in Despatches

Lieutenant General Andries Jacob Brink, CBE, DTD, DSO (21 July 1877 – 17 October 1947) was a South African military commander. An Afrikaner veteran of the Anglo-Boer War, he joined the Union Defence Forces (UDF) as a staff officer in 1912 and served in the First World War. He was Chief of the General Staff from 1920 to 1933, initially in command only of Defence HQ but, from 1922, of the whole UDF. He was also Secretary for Defence, head of the civil service Department of Defence, from 1922 to 1937. From 1937 to 1946, he was Commandant-in-Chief of the Burger Commandos, a home defence organisation.

== Awards and decorations ==
On 1 January 1944 (1944 New Year Honours), Lieutenant General Brink was made a Commander of the Order of the British Empire. The notice in the London Gazette reads as follows:

The KING has been graciously pleased, on the advice of His Majesty's Ministers for the Union of South Africa, to give orders for the following appointments to the Most Excellent Order of the British Empire:

To be Additional Commanders of the Military Division of the said Most Excellent Order:

Lieutenant-General Andries Jacob Brink, D.T.D., D.S.O., South African Staff Corps (V)

Brink was also awarded the Dekoratie voor Trouwe Dienst and Distinguished Service Order.

Government offices
Preceded by Sir Roland Bourne	Secretary for Defence; 1922–1937	Succeeded by Albertonie Herman Broeksma
Military offices
New title Post established	Chief of the General Staff of the Union Defence Force; 1922–1933	Succeeded by Sir Pierre van Ryneveld
