= Henry Lukin =

South African military commander

Major-General Sir Henry Lukin KCB CMG DSO
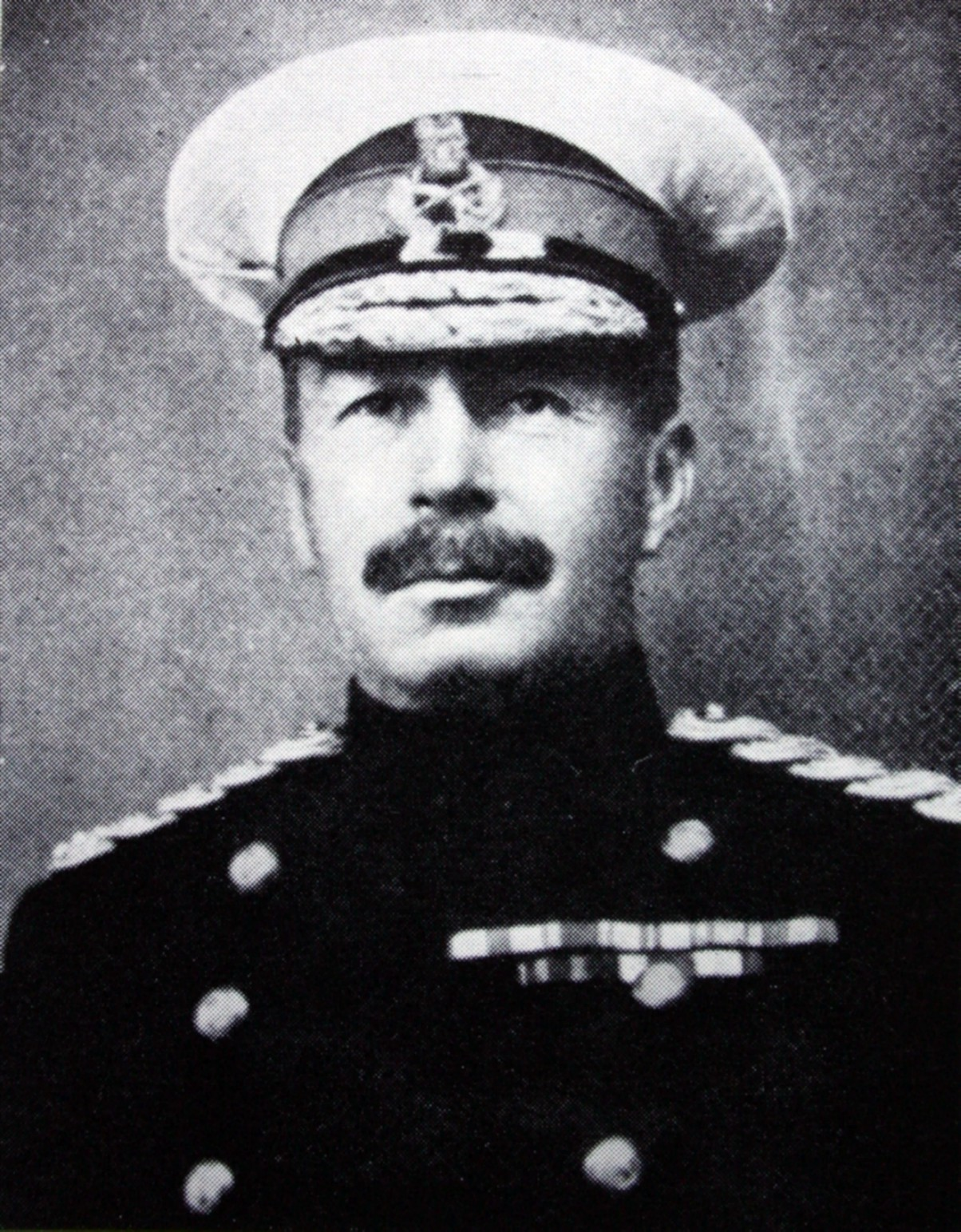
- Born: 24 May 1860; Edith Villas, Fulham, England
- Died: 15 December 1925 (aged 65); Muizenberg, Cape Province
- Burial place: Cape Town, South Africa
- Military career
- Allegiance: Union of South Africa; United Kingdom
- Branch: Army
- Service years: 1878–1919
- Rank: Major-General
- Nickname: Tim
- Unit: Cape Mounted Riflemen
- Commands: 1st South African Infantry Brigade; 9th (Scottish) Division; 64th (2nd Highland) Division
- Conflicts: Anglo-Zulu War; Basutoland Gun War; Bechuanaland Campaign; Second Boer War; First World War
- Awards: Knight Commander of the Order of the Bath; Companion of the Order of St Michael and St George; Distinguished Service Order
- Other work: First president of the British Empire Service League (SA)

Major-General Sir Henry Timson Lukin KCB CMG DSO (24 May 1860 – 15 December 1925) was a South African military commander. He fought in the Anglo-Zulu War (1879) and the Basutoland Gun War (1880–1881), the Bechuanaland Campaign (1897), and the Anglo-Boer War when he was in command of the artillery during the defence of Wepener for which action he was awarded a Distinguished Service Order. From 1900 to 1901 he commanded the Cape Mounted Riflemen, from 1904 to 1912 he was Commandant-General of the Cape Colonial Forces and in 1912 Inspector-General of the Permanent Force of the Union of South Africa.

Brig Gen Lukin transferred to the new Union Defence Forces in 1912 as Inspector-General of the Permanent Force. He commanded a formation in the German South West Africa Campaign (1914–1915), and commanded the 1st South African Infantry Brigade of the South African Overseas Expeditionary Force in Egypt (1916) and France (1916), at Delville Wood before being promoted to a divisional command in the British Army. He was knighted for his war service, and retired in 1919.

== Military career ==
Lukin was the only son of barrister-at-law Robert Henry Lukin of the Inner Temple; Henry or Harry Lukin, as he was usually known, had a sister two years younger and lost his mother when sixteen years old. Henry Lukin did not enter Sandhurst despite a family military tradition. Following the death of his mother in 1867, Lukin instead sailed for Durban in South Africa in January 1879 and was commissioned as lieutenant into the 77th Regiment of Bengough's Horse at the start of the Anglo-Zulu War during which he was seriously wounded at Ulundi in 1879. He transferred to the Cape Mounted Riflemen (CMR) on 23 March 1881 and participating in Basutoland Gun War that year. In 1893 he attended the gunnery and signal course at Woolwich and Shoeburyness in Britain and in 1894 he was promoted to captain.

He participated in the Bechuanaland campaign in 1897 and was deployed with the Colonial Division in the Cape Colony and Orange Free State in 1899 at the start of the Second Boer War. On 13 October 1900 he was appointed as commanding officer of the CMR with the rank of lieutenant-colonel and on 1 June 1901 he was made Second-in-Command of Colonel H. Scobell's column. A couple of days later he was mentioned by Lord Kitchener for gallantry in attack on laager in Cape Colony 8 June 1901, and received the Distinguished Service Order (DSO). Then on 10 October 1901 he was appointed as commander of the column of Lt-Col George Frederick Gorringe. He became Commander of No 1 Area, Queenstown, Cape Colony, in December 1901. In recognition of services during the Second Boer War, he was appointed a Companion of the Order of St Michael and St George (CMG) in the South African Honours list published on 26 June 1902, shortly after the end of the war.

He remained in South Africa and served as Commandant General of the Cape Colonial Forces, CCF with the rank of colonel from 1904. In 1910 he was the escort commander for first opening of the Parliament of the Union of South Africa and the following year he became Commander of South African detachment to attend the coronation of King George V.

On 1 July 1912 he was appointed as inspector-general of the Permanent Forces of the Union Defence Force with the rank of brigadier-general and in 1914 at the start of the First World War he became commander of A-force for the occupation of German South-West Africa. In November and December 1914 he took part in operations against the rebels and on 23 September 1914 he fought at the Battle of Sandfontein in German South-West Africa. In July 1915 he was appointed as commander of the demobilising force in German South-West Africa and on 11 August 1915 he became general officer commanding, the 1st South African Infantry Brigade.

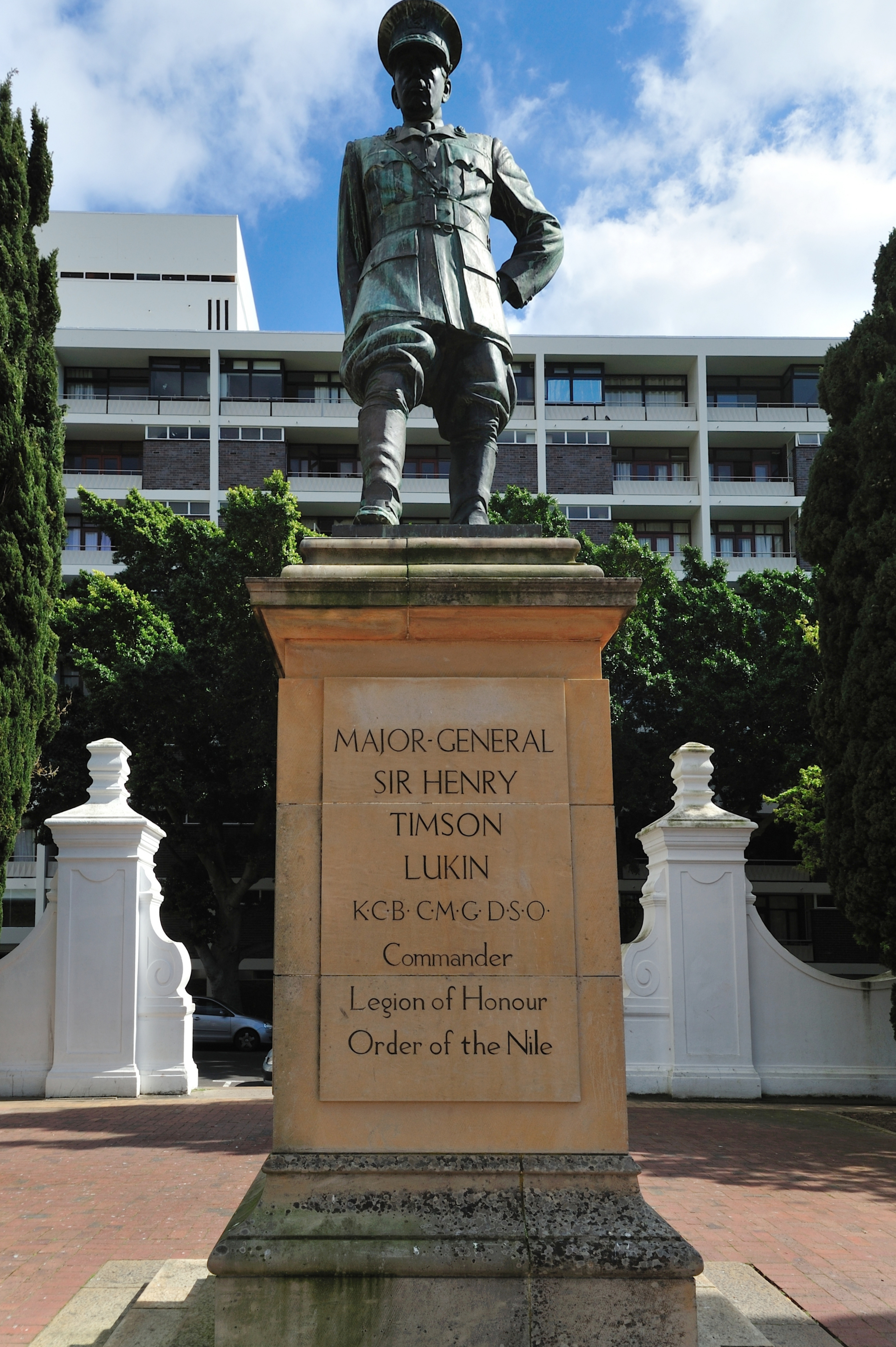
Statue of Sir Henry Lukin in Company's Garden, Cape Town

In September 1915 he sailed for Britain and then in December 1915 he sailed for Egypt to take part in the campaign against The Senussi Uprising. On 6 to 9 February 1916 he was acting commander of the Western Frontier Force in Egypt and on 26 February 1916 he commenced operations against the Senussi Uprising. In April 1916 he sailed for Marseille and on 14 July 1916 the Battle of Delville Wood commenced. On 30 November 1916 he was appointed as general officer commanding, the 9th (Scottish) Division with the temporary rank of major-general. In 1917 he was appointed as a Knight Commander of the Order of the Bath (KCB) and awarded the Order of the Nile, 3rd Class by the Sultan of Egypt. In April 1918 he was appointed as general officer commanding of the 64th (2nd Highland) Division, Eastern Command in Britain before his retirement later that year.

On 26 March 1920 he sailed for Cape Town and in July 1921 he was appointed as deputy chair of the Delville Wood Memorial Committee. In 1924 he became a member of the Defence Council of South Africa and on 28 October 1924 he was appointed as president of a Defence Commission of Enquiry.

== Family ==
In 1891 he married Lily Quinn. After Lukin's death, his brother-in-law Reverend R.E. Johnston wrote a biography in 1929 titled Ulundi to Delville Wood: The life story of Major-General Sir Henry Timson Lukin, K.C.B., C.M.G., D.S.O., Chevalier Legion dhÌ“onneur, Order of the Nile.

== Sources ==
- Judd, Colonel BC (June 1987). "Major-General Sir Henry Timson Lukin, KCB, CMG, DSO". Military History Journal. 7 (3). Johannesburg: South African Military History Society. SA.
- Militaria – Official Professional Journal of the SADF (Vol 12/2: 1982)
- Johnston, R E. (1929). Ulundi to Delville Wood; the Life Story of Major-genl. Sir Henry Timson Lukin, Chevalier Legion D'honneur, Order of the Nile. Miller.

Military offices
Preceded by William Furse	General Officer Commanding the 9th (Scottish) Division; December 1916 – March 1918	Succeeded by Cyril Blacklock
Preceded by Herman Landon	GOC 64th (2nd Highland) Division; April 1918 − November 1918	Succeeded by John Capper
