= William Henry Hewitt =

Recipient of the Victoria Cross

William Henry Hewitt VC
- Born: 19 June 1884; Copdock, Suffolk, England
- Died: 7 December 1966 (aged 82); Cheltenham, Gloucestershire
- Burial place: Cheltenham Cemetery and Crematorium, Cheltenham, Gloucestershire
- Military career
- Allegiance: UK; Union of South Africa
- Branch: South African Forces
- Rank: Major
- Units: 2nd South African Light Infantry
- Conflicts: World War I: Western Front
- Awards: Victoria Cross

William Henry Hewitt VC (19 June 1884 – 7 December 1966) was a South African soldier, and recipient of the Victoria Cross, the highest military award for gallantry in the face of the enemy given to British and Commonwealth forces, during the First World War.

== Details ==
He was 33 years old, and a lance-corporal in the 2nd South African Light Infantry, South African Forces during the First World War when the following deed took place for which he was awarded the VC.

On 20 September 1917 east of Ypres, Belgium, Lance-Corporal Hewitt attacked a pill-box with his section and tried to rush the doorway. The garrison, however, proved very stubborn and in the attempt the lance-corporal received a severe wound. Nevertheless, he proceeded to the loophole of the pill-box where, in his attempts to put a bomb in it, he was again wounded in the arm. Undeterred, he finally managed to get the bomb inside where it dislodged the occupants and they were successfully dealt with by the rest of the section.

== Further information ==
He later achieved the rank of major.

== The medal ==
Hewitt's medal is on permanent loan to the Imperial War Museum from Framlingham College, Suffolk, England. It was given to the school by his wife after his death.

== Bibliography ==
- Snelling, Stephen (2012) [1998]. Passchendaele 1917. VCs of the First World War. The History Press. ISBN 978-0752476667.
