= Permanent Force =

The Permanent Force was an integral part of both the South African Defence Force and the South West Africa Territorial Force which consisted of all the full-time volunteers, volunteers of Auxiliaries and national servicemen.

== South Africa ==
The Defence Act (No. 13) of 1912 established a Union Defence Force (UDF) that included a Permanent Force (or standing army) of career soldiers, an Active Citizen Force (ACF) of temporary conscripts and volunteers as well as a Cadet organization.

== Commonwealth ==
The Permanent Force forms a part of other British Commonwealth militaries such as Australia.

== See also ==
- Military history of South Africa
