= Richard Tyler =

Richard Tyler may refer to:

- Richard Tyler (architect) (1916–2009), British architect
- Richard Tyler (designer) (born 1947), Australian fashion designer
- Richard Tyler (sound engineer) (1928–1990), American sound engineer
- Rick Tyler (Richard Seburn Tyler Jr., born 1957), white supremacist
- Dick Tyler (Richard Tyler, born 1932), American actor
- Richard Tyler (The 4400), a fictional character in the television series The 4400
- Hourman (Rick Tyler), a fictional superhero
