= Guy Bullen =

British soldier

Guy Bullen

Herbert Guy Bullen MC (1896–1937) was a distinguished World War I soldier and later a missionary bishop based in the South Sudan. He was awarded the Military Cross.

== Biography ==
Bullen was born in the east of London and attended the Forest School. He had been a corporal in the school's Officers' Training Corps and, in 1915, volunteered for the army, being appointed 2nd Lieutenant in the 5th Battalion of the South Lancashire Regiment. He received a gunshot wound to his left hand at the Battle of Delville Wood during the Battle of the Somme in September 1916 but was able to return to action in January 1917. In August 1918, he was wounded in the neck which left him with a circular scar. He caught Spanish flu but recovered. For his bravery, in August 1918 he was awarded the Military Cross, the citation for which reads as follows:

For conspicuous gallantry and devotion to duty in an attack. He was wounded at the beginning of the attack, but continued to lead his men, setting them a splendid example of determination, until the objective was achieved.

Bullen ended the Great War in Ireland after which he took a degree at Queens' College, Cambridge, and was ordained. He was a curate in Marylebone from 1924 to 1926 and then spent nine years with the Church Missionary Society in Northern Nigeria. He married Mabel Oswald, a surgeon, in 1928, and her medical expertise and his interest in promoting education made a successful combination. In 1935, Bullen was appointed Assistant Bishop in Egypt and the Sudan. He operated mostly in South Sudan, again especially concerned with education developments but his work was cut short when he was killed in a plane crash after leaving Khartoum.

Bullen was one of the many Great War decorated soldiers who became missionary bishops.
