= Geoffrey Congreve =

British Royal Navy officer and landowner

Sir Geoffrey Congreve 1st Baronet, DSO, DL
- 1939 portrait
- Born: 19 July 1897; Alverstoke, Hampshire, England
- Died: 28 July 1941 (aged 44) off Ambleteuse, Pas-de-Calais, France
- Military career
- Allegiance: United Kingdom
- Branch: Royal Navy
- Service years: 1911–1928, 1939–1941
- Commands: 16th Anti-Submarine Group (1940); HMS Raven (1940)
- Conflicts: First World War; Second World War
- Awards: Distinguished Service Order

Sir Geoffrey Cecil Congreve, 1st Baronet (19 July 1897 – 28 July 1941) was a British Royal Navy officer and landowner. He was the son of General Sir Walter Congreve and entered the Royal Naval College, Osborne in 1911. During the First World Wr he served with the Grand Fleet. In the post-war years Congreve served as aide-de-camp to his father, who was commander of the British Troops in Egypt and Palestine. Congreve was granted the baronetcy intended for his father upon the latter's death in 1927. The following year Congreve retired from the navy to take up farming and was appointed a deputy lieutenant of Staffordshire.

During the Second World War Congreve returned to the navy, taking command of the 16th Anti-Submarine Group of four naval trawlers with which he participated in the 1940 Namsos campaign. He afterwards commanded a Q-boat, HMS Raven, and participated in amphibious operations. Congreve was killed in 1941 in Operation Chess, a commando raid on France.

== Early life ==
Congreve, born on 19 July 1897 at Alverstoke, Hampshire, was the second son of General Sir Walter Congreve and his wife Cecilia Henrietta Dolores La Touche, daughter of Cecil D'Urban La Touche of the Bombay Army. Billy Congreve (1891–1916) was his elder brother.

Congreve was educated at the Royal Naval College, Osborne, from 1911, and the Royal Naval College, Dartmouth. In 1915 he was a midshipman on HMS Benbow, and served in the Grand Fleet through the First World War. During the period 1919 to 1923, when his father was General Officer Commanding, British Troops in Egypt and Palestine, he was in 1921–2 his aide-de-camp.

Walter Congreve died in 1927 as Governor of Malta. The baronetcy intended for him was given in the 1927 Birthday Honours to Geoffrey, his eldest surviving son, the seat being Congreve, Staffordshire. Geoffrey Congreve retired from the navy in 1928, with the rank of lieutenant commander. He farmed an estate of 3,000 acres (1,200 ha) He was appointed a deputy lieutenant of Staffordshire on 15 December 1928.

== Second World War ==
At the outbreak of the Second World War, Congreve became an instructor at the Signals School, HMS Mercury, Portsmouth. He was then given command of four naval trawlers of the Royal Naval Patrol Service, based at Aberdeen and Scapa Flow, among then being HMT Arab. Congreve took command of the force on 22 January 1940, from HMT Aston Villa. After several months of convoy duties and anti-submarine warfare, Congreve received orders on 25 April to cross the North Sea to the coast of Norway, against the German Operation Weserübung. His 16th Anti-Submarine Group comprised the Angle, Arab, Aston Villa and Gaul.

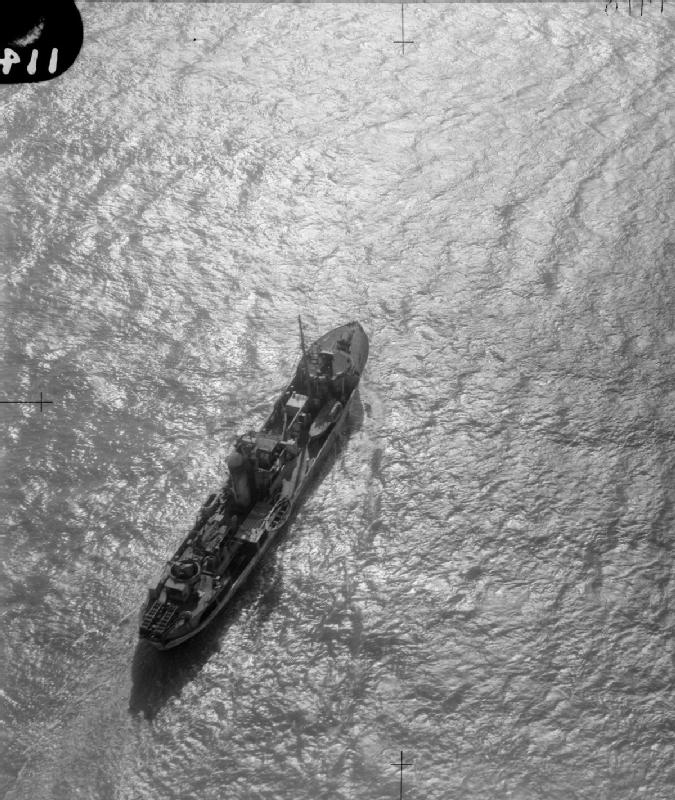
HMT Angle, one of Congreve's force

The trawlers were under William Boyle, 12th Earl of Cork, commanding the fleet of the allied forces attempting to capture Narvik. The Namsenfjorden area in which they were to operate left the vessels exposed to air attack. Both HMT Aston Villa and HMT Gaul were damaged in attacks, to the point of lacking the seaworthiness to make the return crossing of the North Sea, and were scuttled by their crews. Aston Villa was hit by dive-bombers on 30 April, and scuttled on 3 May in Kroken Bay of Namsenfjorden.

Congreve moved to command of the SS Ranen, a Norwegian passenger steamer converted as a Q-boat, going by the name of HMS Raven; he operated against German forces under Eduard Dietl, moving north from Bodø and cut their telephone cables. On 7 May he was sent with HMT Northern Gem to destroy the oil tanks at Svolvær, with success, and engaged in armed action there.

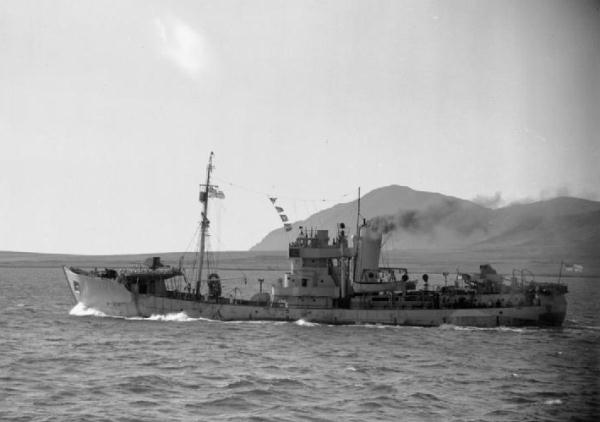
HMT Northern Gem, with Congreve in the raid on Svolvær

In June 1940, after returning from the campaign, Congreve was attached to a demolition party sent to Brest, France. He then became an amphibious operations trainer on the west coast of Scotland at Dorlin and Mallaig. Robert Hamilton, an administrator in the Aden Protectorate tasked in August of that year with taking the war across the Red Sea to the Italians then occupying British Somaliland, went to Lochailort for consultation with and instruction from William Stirling and Congreve. The latter found a way of rigging a QF 2-pounder naval gun on a dhow. For a period he was given command of the Jupiter, a Dutch vessel.

On 12 May 1941 Congreve was posted to HMS Quebec, a training establishment in Inverary.

=== Death ===
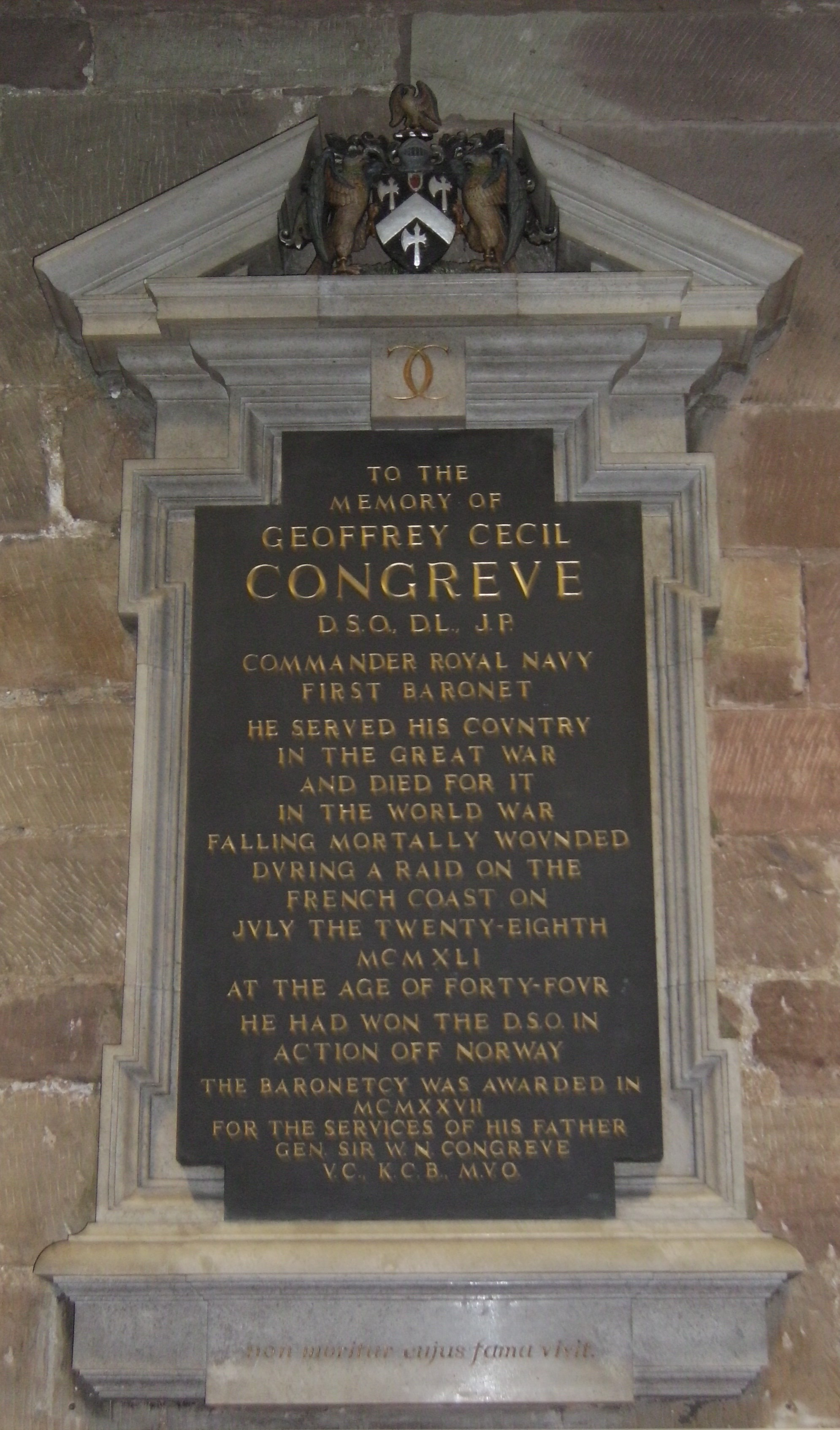
Memorial to Sir Geoffrey Congreve in Penkridge parish church

According to Simon Fraser, a friend, Congreve was determined to win a Victoria Cross. He took part as an observer in Operation Claymore on Lofoten in early 1941. He was an observer again for Operation Chess, a raid on the French coast at Ambleteuse by 16 men of No. 12 Commando. He died on 28 July 1941 on a landing craft where he had been ordered to remain, killed by machine gun fire. His body was cremated in England at Golders Green Crematorium, London.

== Awards and honours ==
On 26 September 1940 it was announced in the London Gazette that Congreve, with rank of commander, had been made a Companion of the Distinguished Service Order (DSO). In the same issue the Distinguished Service Cross was awarded to William Arthur George, skipper of HMT Northern Gem.

== Works ==
The Congreve Family, by Congreve, was printed privately in 1980.

== Family ==
Congreve married Helena Madeline Mary Allhusen, daughter of Augustus Henry Eden Allhusen in 1922. They had three daughters. He left no heir, and the baronetcy became extinct on his death. His wife remarried in 1942, her second husband being Reginald James Tyler, a retired officer of the Ceylon Police. Of the daughters, Ann Henrietta (born 1923) married in 1944 the architect Richard Tyler, son of Reginald Tyler by his first marriage.
