= Walter Congreve =

British Army general and recipient of the Victoria Cross

General Sir Walter Congreve VC KCB MVO KStJ DL
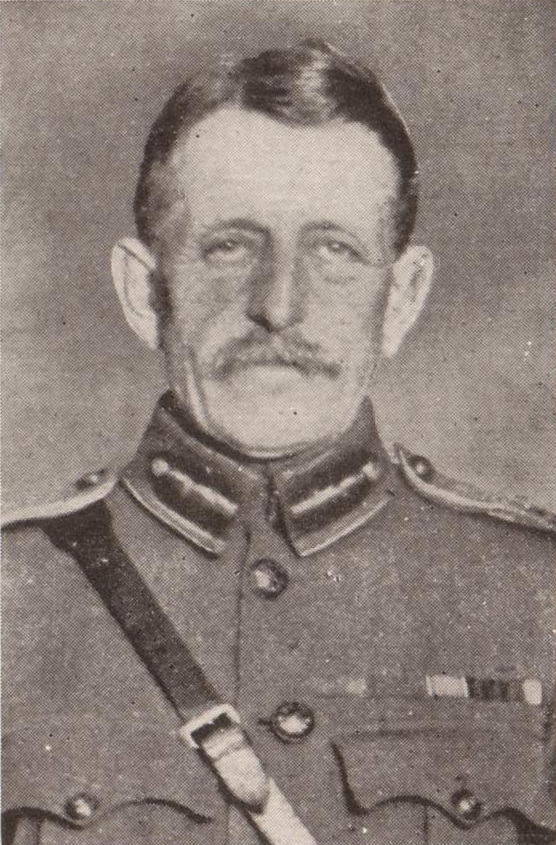
- Born: 20 November 1862; Chatham, Kent, England
- Died: 28 February 1927 (aged 64); Mtarfa Hospital, Malta
- Burial place: Buried at sea between Malta and the Island of Filfla
- Relatives: Major Billy Congreve (son); Cecil Ralph Townshend Congreve (brother); Lt Cdr Geoffrey Congreve (son)
- Military career
- Allegiance: United Kingdom
- Branch: British Army
- Service years: 1885–1924
- Rank: General
- Nickname: "Squibs"
- Units: North Staffordshire Regiment; Rifle Brigade (The Prince Consort's Own)
- Commands: Southern Command (1923–1924); British Troops in Egypt (1919–1923); VII Corps (1918); XIII Corps (1915–1918); 6th Division (1915); 18th Brigade (1914–1915)
- Conflicts: Second Boer War; First World War
- Awards: Victoria Cross; Knight Commander of the Order of the Bath; Member of the Royal Victorian Order; Mentioned in Despatches
- Other work: Deputy Lieutenant of Staffordshire; Governor of Malta (1924–1927)

General Sir Walter Norris Congreve, VC, KCB, MVO, KStJ, DL (20 November 1862 – 28 February 1927) was a British Army officer in the Second Boer War and the First World War, and Governor of Malta from 1924 to 1927. He received the Victoria Cross, the highest award for gallantry in the face of the enemy that can be awarded to British and Commonwealth forces.

== Early life ==
Walter Norris Congreve was born in Chatham, Kent, on 20 November 1862, the son of William and Fanny E. Congreve, of Castle Church, Stafford. His father was then a captain in the British Army, having served with both the 9th (East Norfolk) and 29th (Worcestershire) Regiments of Foot and would later become the chief constable of Staffordshire from 1866 until 1888. Walter himself was educated at Twyford School, Harrow School and Pembroke College, Oxford. He did not graduate from the latter, however, "having left after a senior member of the college was wounded with an air rifle. This perhaps was the first sign of Congreve's passion for shooting and mystery that served him so well in his later career."

== Early military career ==
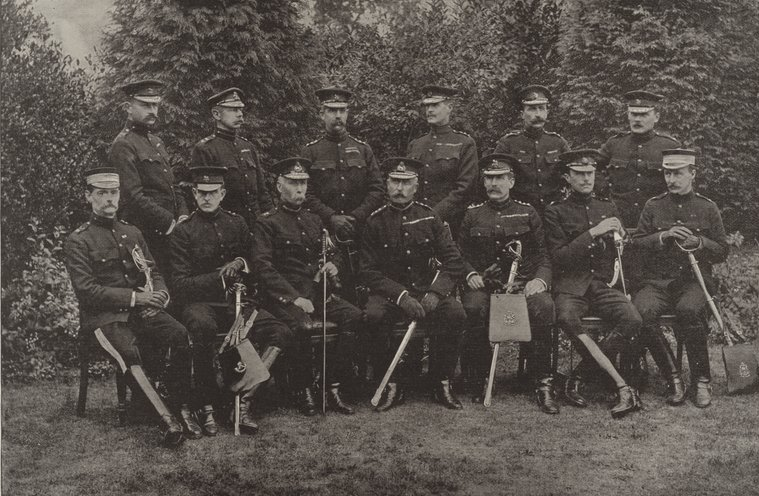
The retirement of the Duke of Connaught from the Aldershot Command, 1898. Sat second on the left in the front row is Captain Congreve.

Congreve was commissioned into the militia battalion of the North Staffordshire Regiment in January 1880.

After resigning his commission in March 1884, Congreve, after graduating from the Royal Military College, Sandhurst, was re-commissioned as a lieutenant in the Rifle Brigade (The Prince Consort's Own) in February 1885 and promoted to captain in December 1893. In January 1898 he was appointed a district inspector of musketry for Aldershot Command.

== Second Boer War ==
After the Second Boer War started in October 1899, Congreve went to South Africa after being made a brigade major in the Ladysmith relief force in March 1900. He was present at the Second Battle of Colenso when British troops commanded by Sir Redvers Buller attempted to cross the Tugela River to relieve the besieged city of Ladysmith. The Boers repelled all attempts to cross the river, and the British were forced to retreat in one of their biggest defeats of the war.

=== Action at Colenso ===
On 15 December 1899 at the Second Battle of Colenso, Captain Congreve with several others, tried to save the guns of the 14th and 66th Batteries, Royal Field Artillery, when the detachments serving the guns had all become casualties or been driven from their guns. Some of the horses and drivers were sheltering in a donga (gully) about 500 yards behind the guns and the intervening space was swept with shell and rifle fire. Captain Congreve, with two other officers (Frederick Roberts and Harry Norton Schofield), and Corporal George Nurse retrieved two of the guns. All four received the VC for this action. (Roberts was the son of Field Marshal Earl Roberts). Then, although wounded himself, seeing one of the officers fall, Congreve went out with Major William Babtie, RAMC, who also received the VC for this action, and brought in the wounded man. His citation read:

At Colenso on the 15th December, 1899, the detachments serving the guns of the 14th and 66th Batteries, Royal Field Artillery, had all been either killed, wounded, or driven from their guns by Infantry fire at close range, and the guns were deserted. About 500 yards behind the guns was a donga in which some of the few horses and drivers left alive were sheltered. The intervening space was swept with shell and rifle fire. Captain Congreve, Rifle Brigade, who was in the donga, assisted to hook a team into a limber, went out; and assisted to limber up a gun. Being wounded, he took shelter; but, seeing Lieutenant Roberts fall, badly wounded, he went out again and brought him in. Captain Congreve was shot through the leg, through the toe of his boot, grazed on the elbow and the shoulder, and his horse shot in three places.

=== Later service in South Africa ===
Wounded, Congreve did not take part in the actual relief of Ladysmith in February 1900, but he was back in service later that year, and served as a staff officer. He served as adjutant in a newly established colonial mounted infantry regiment which, with the leave of Lord Roberts, was named after his chief of staff, "Kitchener's Horse". The unit was employed, with distinction, in the operations undertaken by Lord Roberts in February 1900 for the relief of Kimberley and his advance on Bloemfontein and later Pretoria. Lord Kitchener took over the chief command of British forces in South Africa in November 1900, and appointed Congreve his personal secretary. He was promoted to major on 21 December 1901, and on the next day received a brevet promotion as lieutenant-colonel in recognition of services in South Africa. Following the end of hostilities in early June 1902, he left Cape Town on board the SS Orotava together with Lord Kitchener, and arrived at Southampton the next month. He was mentioned in a despatch by Lord Kitchener in June 1902.

== Inter-war years ==
After the war, Congreve held a series of staff posts in Britain and Ireland, steadily advancing through the ranks as he did so. In November 1902 he joined the staff of the 3rd Army Corps in Ireland as he was appointed assistant military secretary and aide-de-camp to the commander-in-chief of the corps, Prince Arthur, Duke of Connaught and Strathearn. In May 1904 he became private secretary. He was promoted to lieutenant colonel and colonel while serving on half-pay in July 1908.

In September 1909 he was made commandant of the School of Musketry in Hythe, Kent, in succession to Colonel Granville Egerton. In this post he excelled, and apparently, "greatly improved rifle skills, raising the rate of fire to fifteen armed shots a minute".

He served in this post until December 1911 when Colonel Harold Ruggles-Brise took over as the school's new commandant while Congreve left for a new assignment. This came when he succeeded Major General George Gorringe as general officer commanding (GOC) of the 18th Infantry Brigade, part of the 6th Division, and was raised to the temporary rank of brigadier general while employed in this role. The division was stationed in Ireland and serving under Irish Command at the time and was one of those designated to form part of a British Expeditionary Force (BEF) in the event of war.

== First World War ==
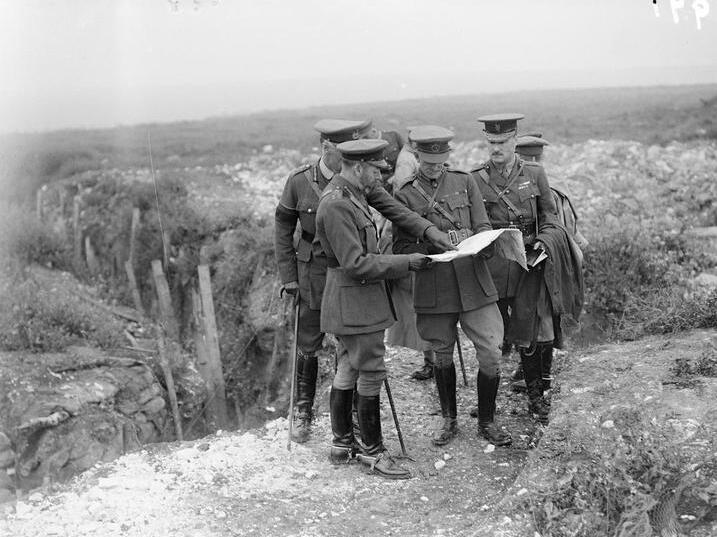
King George V with General Sir Henry Rawlinson, GOC British Fourth Army (pointing at map), and Lieutenant-General Sir Walter Congreve, GOC XIII Corps, on St. George's Hill near Fricourt, France, 10 August 1916.

At the outbreak of the First World War in the summer of 1914, Congreve's brigade was on manoeuvres in Wales at the time of the war's outset. Although suffering from asthma, he deployed with the formation in the BEF to France, taking part in the First Battle of the Aisne.

The division was stationed near Neuve-Chapelle when Congreve's men took part in the 1914 Christmas truce. In a letter written on Christmas Day itself, Brigadier-General Congreve wrote recalling how the Germans opposite his lines initiated by calling a truce earlier the same day, how one of his men got out over the parapet to meet in no man's land, and how officers and men exchanged cigars and cigarettes. Congreve admitted he was reluctant to personally witness the scene of the truce for fear he would be a prime target for German snipers.

=== The Somme: Delville Wood ===
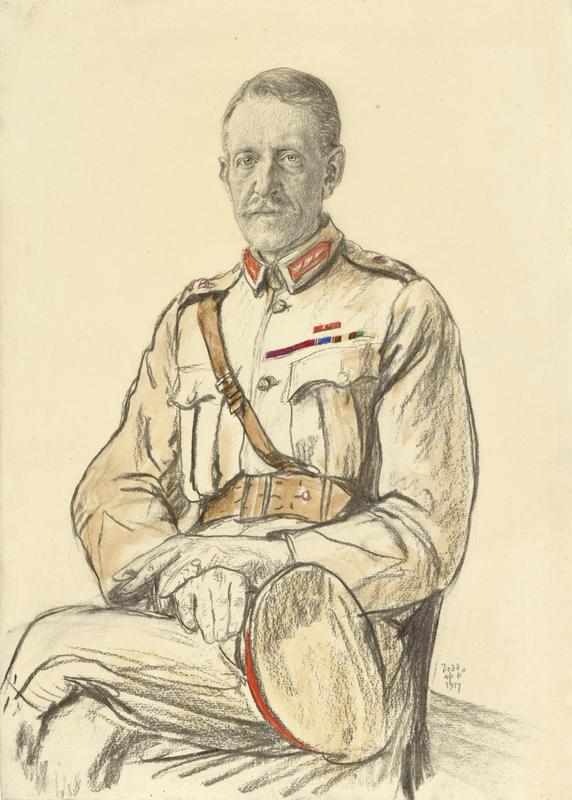
Half length portrait of Lieutenant General Walter Congreve VC.

Congreve, promoted on 18 February 1915 to major general "for services rendered in connection with Operations in the Field", was general officer commanding (GOC) of the 6th Division from May onwards.

He was then GOC of the newly formed XIII Corps as a temporary lieutenant general from November 1915. As the GOC of XIII Corps, Congreve led the battles for Longueval and Delville Wood between 14 July and 3 September 1916. The rapid advance of his corps in the southern sector of the Somme offensive had brought about a situation where the allied front was set at a right angle – the left sector facing north and the right, facing east from Delville Wood. This meant that an advance on a wide front would result in the attacking forces diverging as they advanced. In order to "straighten the line," General Sir Douglas Haig, commander-in-chief (C-in-C) of the BEF, had decided to exploit the advances which had been made by Congreve in the south by taking and holding the town of Longueval and Delville Wood. Being on fairly high ground and providing good spotting opportunities for artillery fire, an occupied Longueval would protect the right flank and allow the Allies to advance in the north and align their left with that of Congreve's XIII Corps on the right. XIII Corps succeeded in securing Delville Wood, but it was one of the bloodiest confrontations of the Somme, with both sides incurring large casualties.

During the war, Congreve, made a Knight Commander of the Order of the Bath in January 1917, and his rank of lieutenant general was made substantive in January 1918,

During the war, Congreve lost a hand in action. Having remained out of action for the rest of 1917, Congreve continued his war service by becoming GOC VII Corps in January 1918.

== Later life ==
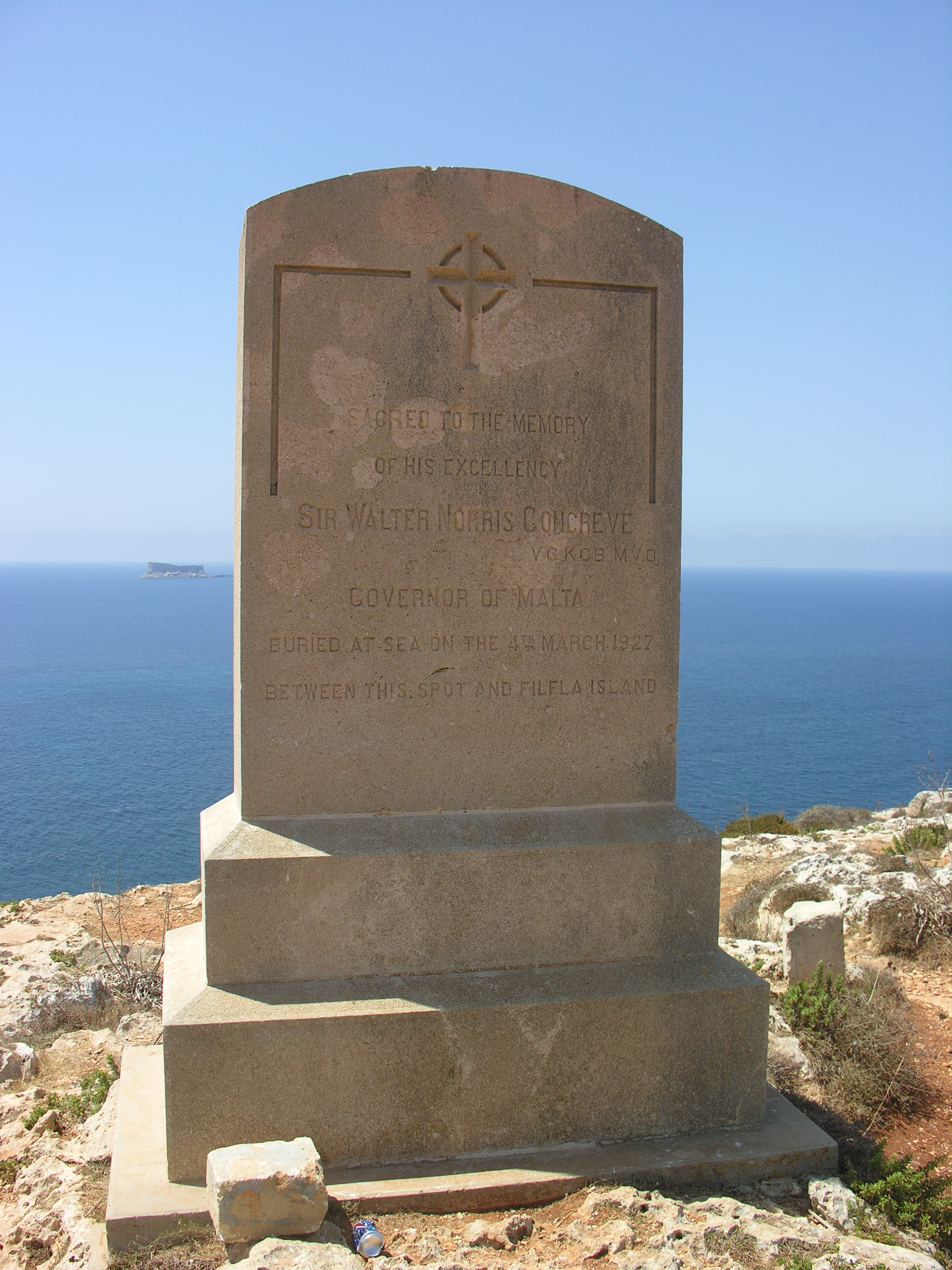
The memorial to Walter Norris Congreve in Qrendi, Malta.

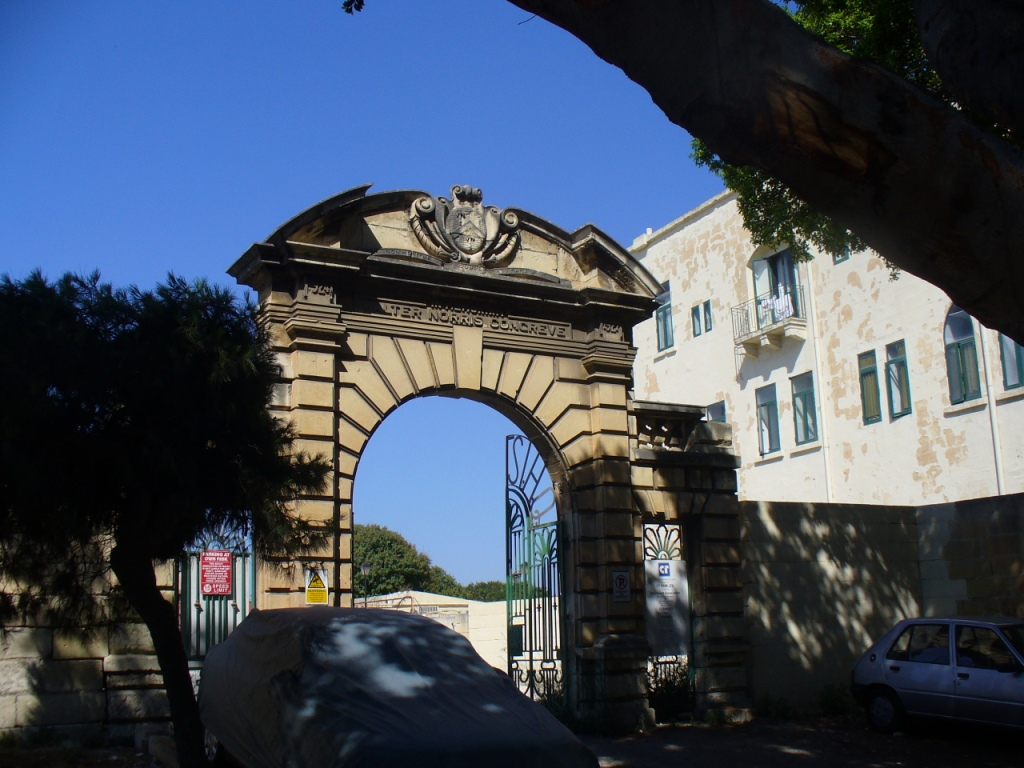
Congreve Arch in Floriana, Malta.

Later Congreve, who in June 1921 was made colonel commandant of the Rifle Brigade, rose to the rank of general in November 1922. He was GOC of the British Troops in Egypt between October 1919, when he was first appointed, and 1923 and then general officer commanding-in-chief of Southern Command between April 1923 and June 1924, when he relinquished this assignment.

From 1924 to 1927, he served as the governor of Malta, where he died on 27 February 1927, at the age of 64. At his request, he was buried at sea in the channel between the coast and Filfla Island; there is a small monument to him on the coast between Hamrija Tower and the prehistoric site of Mnajdra; the channel between Malta and Filfla is known as Congreve Channel (the official name is 'Il-Fliegu ta' Filfla').

One of the three school houses of St. Edward's College in Cottonera, Malta, a Catholic school for boys founded in 1929 is also named after Congreve. The other two being Campbell and Ducane, after General David Campbell and Sir John Du Cane, all former governors of Malta.

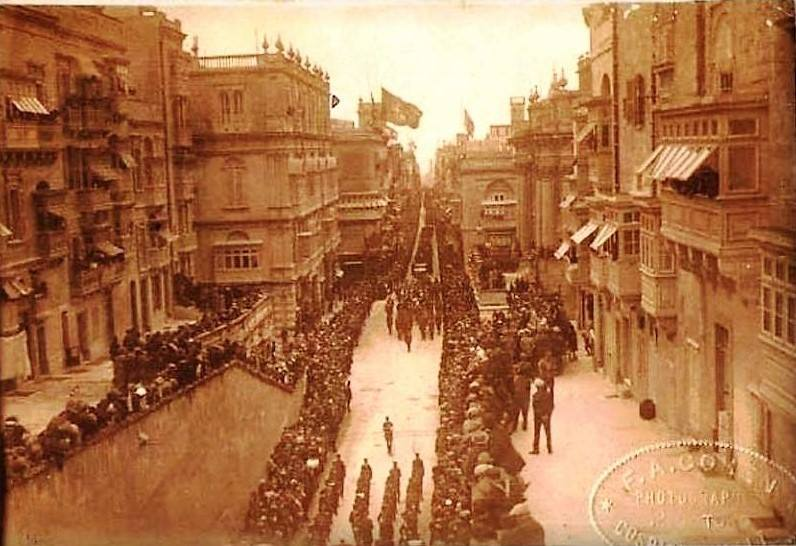
Funeral procession for General Sir Walter Norris Congreve in Valletta, Malta, 1927.

There is also a stone bearing his name above the gate to the "Scouts" HQ in Floriana, just outside the capital Valletta.

From 1903 to 1924, Congreve had a home in Shropshire at West Felton Grange. His service in the First World War is recorded, with that of his son William, in a Roll of Honour book in St Michael's Church at West Felton.

== Family ==
Congreve married at St Jude's Church, Kensington, on 18 May 1890, Cecilia Henrietta Dolores Blount La Touche. Lady Congreve was a nurse in the First World War, and a poet and author of "The Firewood Poem".

They were the parents of Major Billy Congreve VC – they are one of only three father and son pairs to win a VC. Their younger son Geoffrey Cecil Congreve was created a baronet, of Congreve in the County of Stafford, in July 1927. The eldest son, Arthur (d.1992), served as a Major in the Rifle Brigade.

== Victoria Cross ==
Congreve's VC is on display at the Royal Green Jackets (Rifles) Museum, Winchester, Hampshire.

== Bibliography ==
- Buchan, John (1992). The history of the South African forces in France (Litho reprint of 1920 ed.). London: Imperial War Museum & Battery Press. ISBN 0-901627-89-5.
- Prior, Robin and; Wilson, Trevor (2005). The Somme (1st ed.). New Haven: Yale University Press. ISBN 0-300-10694-7.
- Uys, Ian S. (2000). Victoria Crosses of the Anglo-Boer War. Fortress. ISBN 978-0620254472.
- Ingleton, Roy (2011). Kent VCs. Pen and Sword Books. ISBN 978-1848844094.
- Davies, Frank; Maddocks, Graham (2014) [1995]. Bloody Red Tabs: General Officer Casualties of the Great War 1914–1918. Pen and Sword Books. ISBN 978-1-78346-237-7.
- Thornton, Leslie Heber (1930). The Congreves, Father and Son: General Sir Walter Norris Congreve V.C., BT.-Major William La Touche Congreve V.C. J. Murray. OCLC 1373264.

Military offices
Preceded by John Keir	GOC 6th Division; May–November 1915	Succeeded by Charles Ross
Preceded by Thomas Snow	GOC VII Corps; January–April 1918	Post disbanded
Preceded by Viscount Allenby	GOC British Troops in Egypt and the Egyptian Expeditionary Force; 1919–1923	Succeeded by Sir Richard Haking
Honorary titles
Preceded by Sir Christopher Nicholl	Colonel-Commandant of the 1st Battalion, Rifle Brigade (The Prince Consort's Own); 1921–1927	Succeeded by Sir Victor Couper
Military offices
Preceded by Sir George Harper	GOC-in-C Southern Command; 1923–1924	Succeeded by Sir Alexander Godley
Government offices
Preceded by The Lord Plumer	Governor of Malta; 1924–1927	Succeeded by Sir John Du Cane
