= Billy Congreve =

Recipient of the Victoria Cross

William La Touche Congreve
- Born: 12 March 1891; Burton, Cheshire, United Kingdom
- Died: 20 July 1916 (aged 25); Delville Wood, Longueval, France
- Burial place: Corbie Communal Cemetery Extension
- Relatives: General Sir Walter Congreve (father)
- Military career
- Allegiance: United Kingdom
- Branch: British Army
- Rank: Major
- Units: Rifle Brigade
- Conflicts: First World War; Battle of the Somme; Battle of Delville Wood †
- Awards: Victoria Cross; Distinguished Service Order; Military Cross; Mentioned in Despatches; Knight of the Legion of Honour (France)

William La Touche Congreve, VC, DSO, MC (12 March 1891 – 20 July 1916) was an English recipient of the Victoria Cross, the highest and most prestigious award for gallantry in the face of the enemy that can be awarded to British and Commonwealth forces.

== Life and career ==
He was the son of General Sir Walter Congreve, also a Victoria Cross awardee – they are one of only three father and son pairings to win a VC. His younger brother Geoffrey Congreve was a distinguished sailor.

He was at school at Summer Fields School, Oxford, and then at Eton, leaving in 1907. On 1 June 1916 he married Pamela Cynthia Maude (1893-1975), the daughter of actors Cyril Maude and Winifred Emery.

Congreve was 25 years old, and a major in The Rifle Brigade, British Army, during the First World War when the following deed took place for which he was awarded the VC.

During the period 6 to 20 July 1916 at Longueval, France, Major Congreve constantly inspired those round him by numerous acts of gallantry. As Brigade Major he not only conducted battalions up to their positions but when the brigade headquarters was heavily shelled he went out with the medical officer to remove the wounded to places of safety, although he himself was suffering from gas and other shell effects. He went out again on a subsequent occasion tending the wounded under heavy shell fire. Finally, on returning to the front line to ascertain the position after an unsuccessful attack, he was shot by a sniper and died instantly.

His widow bore a posthumous daughter, Mary Gloria Congreve, born 21 March 1917. Pamela Congreve later remarried, to Brigadier the Hon. William Fraser, in 1919.

== Memorials ==
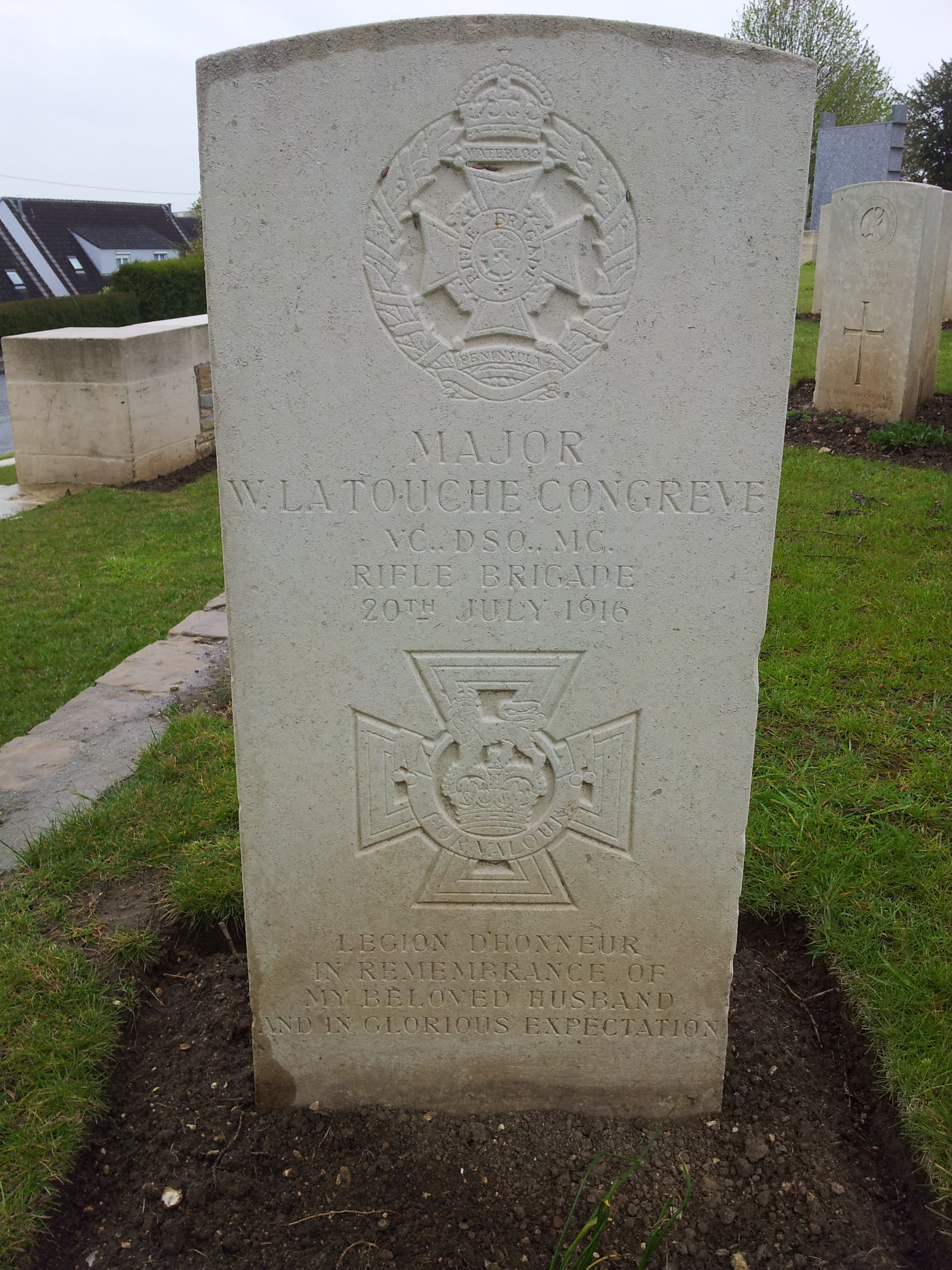
Major Congreve's grave.

William Congreve's grave is at Corbie Communal Cemetery Extension, France, 9 miles east of Amiens, Plot I, Row F, Grave 35. There is also a memorial to him in the form of a plaque in Corbie church, designed by Sir Edwin Lutyens.

Lutyens designed another plaque to his memory which is at St John the Baptist's church in Stowe-by-Chartley, Staffordshire.

Congreve's service in the First World War is also recalled, along with that of his father, in a Roll of Honour book in St Michael's Church, West Felton, Shropshire, the latter village having been his childhood home when his father lived at West Felton Grange from 1903 to 1924. His VC is recorded in the same village on the community building called the Haslehurst Institute, land for building which had been given by his father.

His Victoria Cross is displayed at the Royal Green Jackets (Rifles) Museum, Winchester, England.
