= Richard Tyler (architect) =

English architect (1916–2009)

Richard Michael Townsend Tyler
- Born: 9 November 1916; Ceylon
- Died: 13 January 2009 (aged 92)
- Education: Charterhouse School, England and Bristol School of Architecture, England
- Spouse: Henrietta Congreve
- Parent(s): James Tyler and Audrey Townsend

Richard Michael Townsend Tyler (9 November 1916 – 13 January 2009) was an English architect who was notable for his restoration work on large private houses after the Second World War, which allowed families to own more manageable homes while remaining sympathetic to their original designs.

== Early life and military career ==
Tyler was born in Ceylon in 1916, where his father was an officer in the colonial police. At the age of seven he was sent to Bath in England to live with an aunt of his mother. As a child he was educated at Charterhouse where he became captain of the rifle Eight. Showing a flair for drawing he was awarded a place at the Bristol School of Architecture.

In 1937, while holidaying in Germany, he was bullied by a group of people in an attempt to make him throw stones at a synagogue. This event led Tyler to believe that a war with Nazi Germany was inevitable and he signed up for military service once war was declared. Although Tyler was unfit for service due to poor eyesight and hearing, he still managed to be accepted and joined the Royal Engineers. He was assigned to the 7th Armoured Division's Support Group under the command of Brigadier John Charles Campbell. In 1941, as part of Operation Crusader, Tyler was injured in the defence of the Sidi Rezegh airfield. While trying to move a munitions truck, Tyler was struck in the thigh by shrapnel from a German tank. By the time he reached Cairo, the wound was gangrenous and his leg was amputated.

== Return to England and practice as an architect ==
On returning to England, after convalescing in South Africa, he discovered that his father had remarried; Tyler had only heard of his mother's death shortly before seeing action in Africa. His stepmother, Madeleine Allhusen, was the former wife of Sir Geoffrey Congreve, and Tyler married one of her daughters, Henrietta, in 1944. His stepmother inherited Brahan Castle in Dingwall, Scotland, but the property was full of dry rot and beyond fiscal repair. Tyler used gelignite to demolish the Victorian additions to the building to leave a purposeful ruin; while converting outhouses into living quarters on the estate.

Tyler set up an architects' practice in London with fellow war veteran Tom Bird. The two had met in a Cairo hospital having been wounded on the same day. Although the partners tended to work on separate projects, they sometimes made joint reconstructions. A notable joint venture was Hall Barn near Beaconsfield for Edward Levy-Lawson, 1st Baron Burnham, in which the architects stripped the house back, removing Victorian additions to revert the building to a state resembling its original form.

Other works by Tyler included reconstruction to Forde Abbey in Dorset, Salisbury Cathedral, Levens Hall in Cumbria and Knebworth House in Hertfordshire.
