= Gerrit Rudolph =

Gerrit Rudolph may refer to:

- Gerrit Jacobus Rudolph, South African politician
- Gerrit Rudolph (cricketer) (born 1988), Namibian cricketer
