= Gert Rudolph =

South African politician (1797–1851)

Gerhardus Jacobus Rudolph (1797–1851) was the grandson of the South African Rudolph progenitor, Johan Bernhard Rudolph.

He was a member of a scouting expedition, set up by Piet Uys, which left the Eastern Cape Uitenhage and Albany area on 8 September 1834. Gert, as he was affectionately known, farmed together with Piet Uys in the Lower Bushmans River area of the Eastern Cape. Amongst the approximately 21 whites that made up the group were: the scout J.H. (Hans Dons) de Lange, Johannes Stephanus Maritz and two brothers of Piet Uys, the thirty-four-year-old Jacobus Johannes and the fifteen-year-old Johannes Zacharias. The expedition wanted to establish if it was possible to acquire arable areas in Natal that could have been successfully farmed. At the same time it would also have been an adventurous hunting expedition that could have returned profitable gains.

Gert later was the leader of one of the Voortrekker groups to have left the Eastern Cape Province of South Africa to escape the British Colonization of the Cape of Good Hope as well as the continual cross border raids by the Xhosa to their north.

He was the first cousin of Gert Maritz, a well known Voortrekker leader in early Natal history.

Shortly after leaving the Eastern Cape his trek joined up together with that of Gert Maritz. Fiery of character, he became a renowned Voortrekker leader and fighter. He led the Voortrekkers in many skirmishes against the natives of Southern Africa during their trek into the unknown. He became the leader of their combined trek after Gert Maritz died at Zaailager, Natal on 23 September 1838.

In January 1840, Rudolph and Andries Pretorius helped Mpande kaSenzangakhona in his revolt against his half-brother Dingane, who was then killed on an expedition north in the Hlatikhulu Forest. In gratitude for his help in overthrowing Dingane, the new king Mpande gave Gert Rudolph a concession to farm in this area.

He later became a South African Boer political figure and served as the last head of state of Natalia between 1842 and 1843.

== See also ==
- Battle of Italeni
