= Battle of Italeni =

1838 battle in South Africa

- Part of the Great Trek
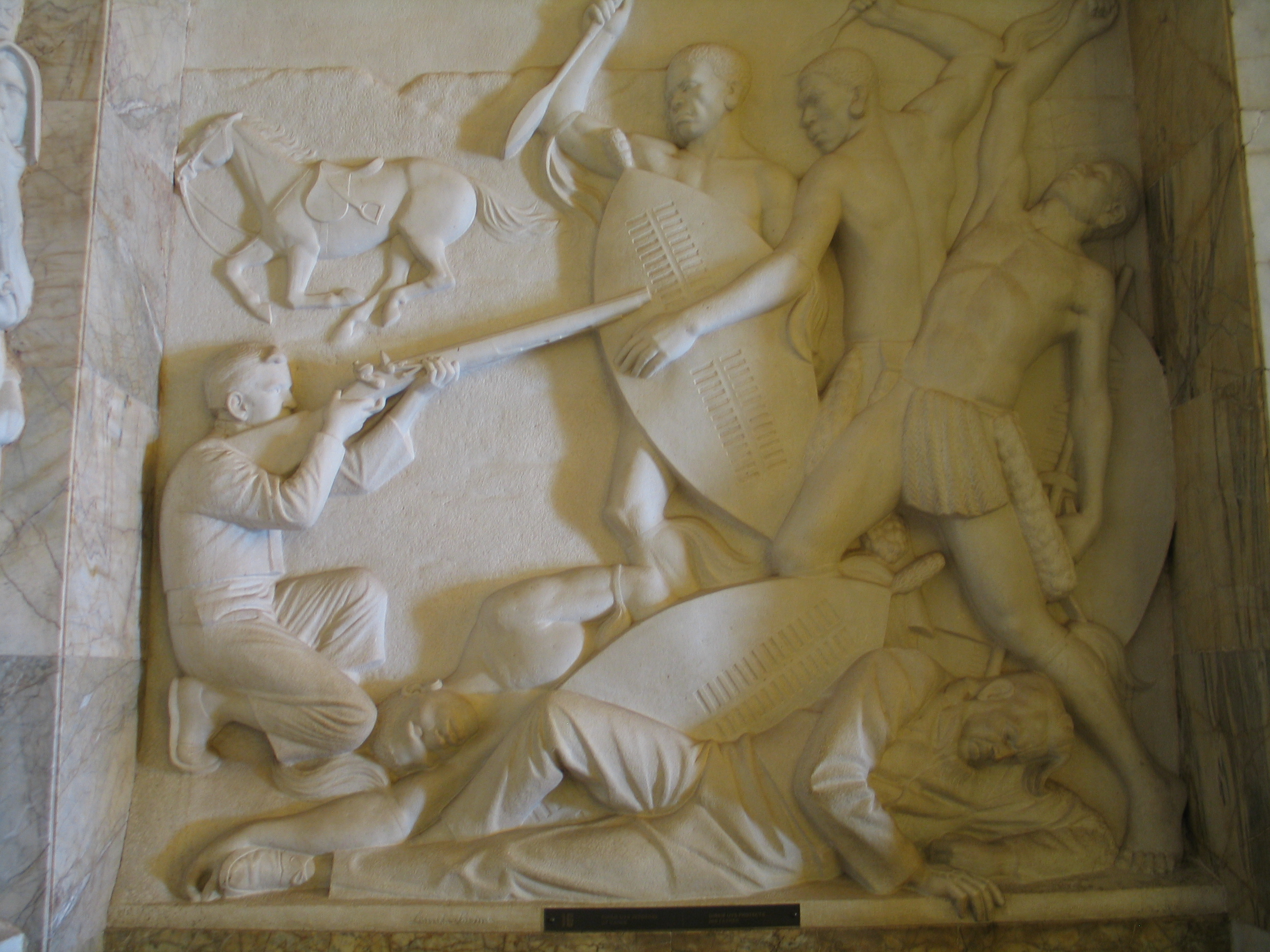
- Piet Uys and his son Dirkie die in battle, as depicted in the Voortrekker Monument
Date	9 April 1838
Location	Near Umgungundlovu, KwaZulu-Natal, South Africa 28°27′37.76″S 31°15′01.6″E
Result	Zulu victory

Belligerents
Voortrekkers	Zulu Kingdom

Commanders and leaders
Piet Uys †; Hendrik Potgieter	Ndlela kaSompisi, Nzobo kaSobadli

Strength
347 mounted infantry	About 7,000 infantry

Casualties and losses
10 dead	600–700 Zulu warriors
- Location within KwaZulu-Natal Battle of Italeni (South Africa)

The Battle of Italeni took place in what is now KwaZulu Natal province, South Africa. It was fought between the Voortrekkers and the Zulus on 9 April 1838, during the period of the Great Trek.

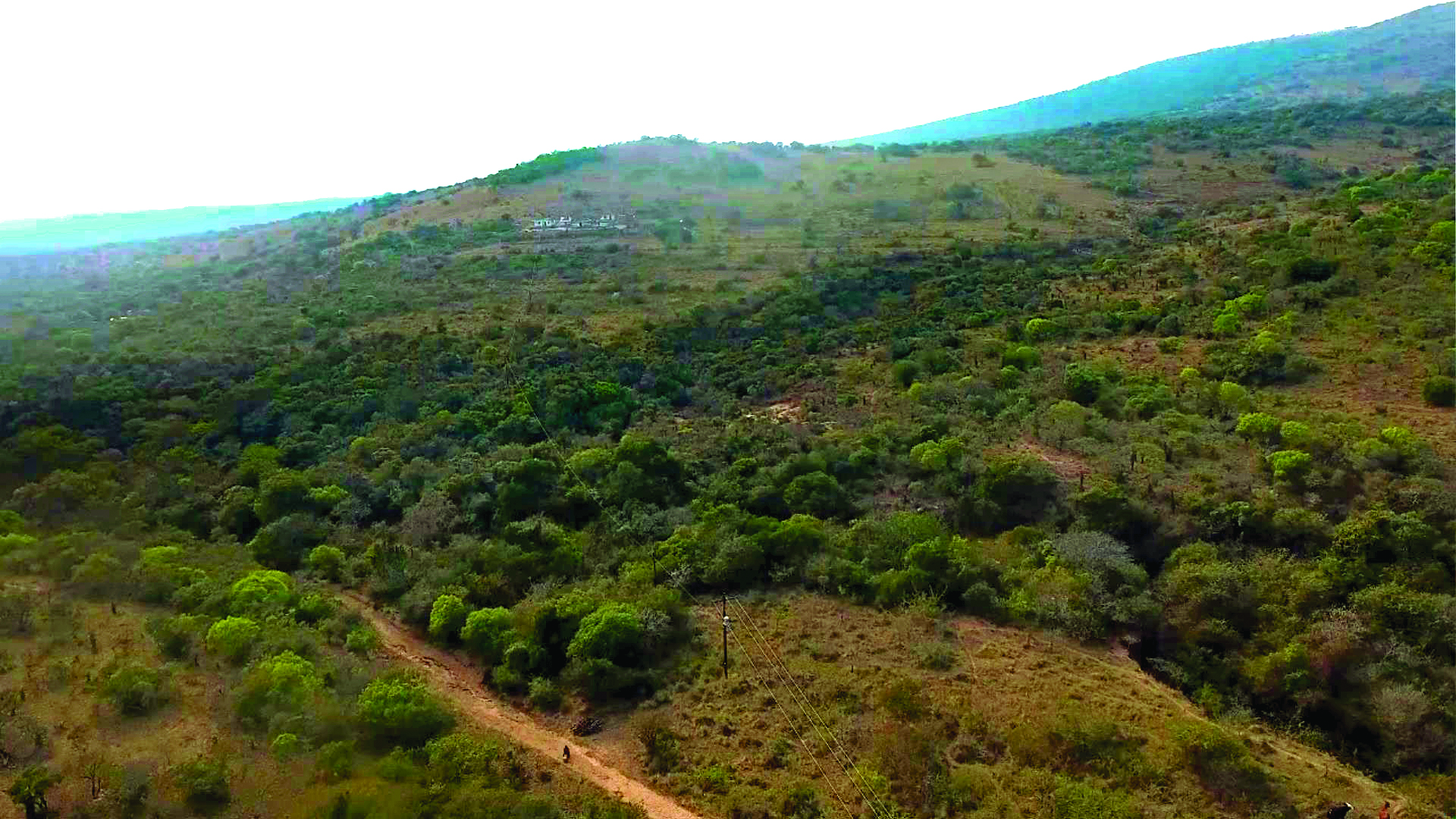
Italeni, the small hillock where the battle took place. The Nzololo stream is at the bottom of the photo with the Reed creek running diagonally below Italeni

== Background ==
After the massacre of Piet Retief and his men by Dingane on 6 February 1838, a number of Voortrekker camps were also attacked by the Zulu impis on 17 February 1838. The Voortrekker leader Gerrit Maritz became increasingly ill and was unable to lead an expedition. It was decided that Piet Uys and Hendrik Potgieter would lead a punitive commando in retaliation to the aggression by the Zulus and their king, Dingane ka Senzangakona. During the meeting close to Blaaukransriver, Uys was elected as "General Field Commandant" by those present - becoming, in effect, the first elected Boer Commandant-General. Potgieter—a natural leader—objected to this and stated that he and his men were not prepared to serve under any other leader. As a compromise, it was decided that each commando would remain under its own leader, but that both parties would fight together. This arrangement would prove to have disastrous consequences.

== The battle ==
The two commandos (347 men) set out in two separate columns, on and 6 April 1838. For the sake of speed and agility it was decided not to take wagons. Baggage, provisions and extra ammunition were carried by between 75 and 100 pack horses.

Ndlela ka Sompisi lured the Voortrekkers close to uMgungundlovu. The Voortrekkers descended from Kataza Mountain in the Ntonjaneni range down a mountain pass. The royal capital was visible some 5 km away, and across the Nzololo stream in the valley they could see some Zulu warriors atop a small hillock, sitting quietly on their shields. This small hill was close to the centre of a basin formed by low ridges and was called Italeni. It stood like a sentinel some 3000m from uMgungundlovu. There was a plain between Italeni and the Nzololo stream on the western side of the basin. The Reed creek ran diagonally across the basin from east to west below a low neck between Italeni and the eastern rim of the basin. Deep gulleys and dongas criss-crossed the rocky terrain.

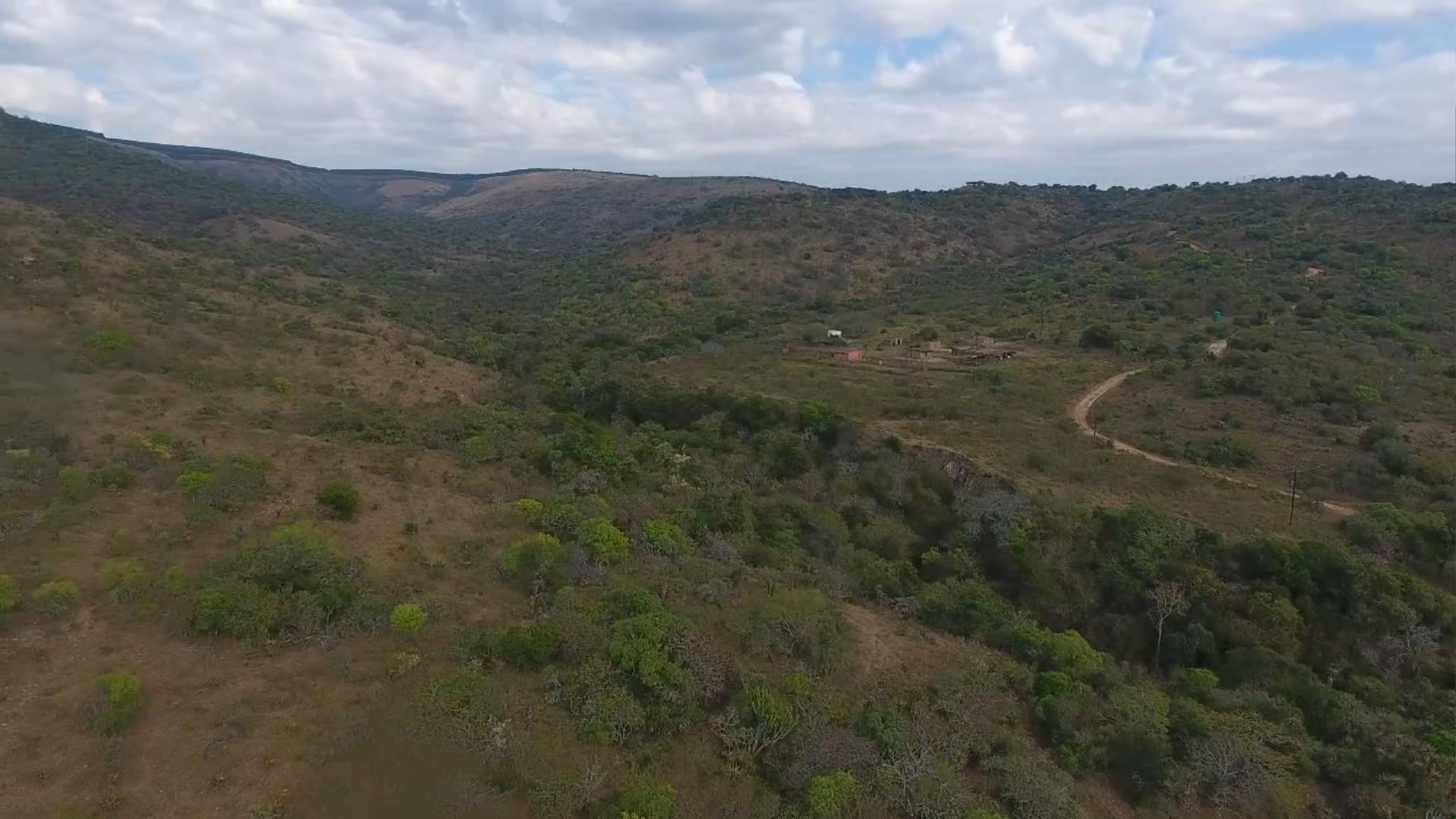
The packhorses were left where the farmstead stands today

The Voortrekkers halted a 1000m from the Zulu warriors on top of Italeni. They noticed second column slowly advancing across the plain between Italeni and the Nzololo. Uys gave Potgieter a choice as to which impi he would like to attack. Potgieter chose the one on the plain, while Uys decided to attack the hill in front of the commando. The pack horses were left here and Uys crossed the Nzololo. He continued along the deep pools of the Reed creek and crossed it some 120m further, swinging north to ascend Italeni Hill where the white shields were waiting.

After riding to within 36 metres of the Zulu force, Uys ordered his men to dismount and open fire. The first two volleys from the Voortrekkers decimated the first two lines of the impi, who were still sitting on their shields. The Uys Commando then heard the first volley of the Potgieter Commando, which at this stage was not visible to them. Uys ordered his men to use buckshot and fired a third volley. The White shields then took flight, running back down Italeni hill in the direction of uMgungundlovu. What seemed to Uys and his men as a rout, was in fact a brilliant tactical withdrawal by the Zulus, to draw the commando over the kopje. The Voortrekkers quickly mounted their horses and followed the fleeing Zulus in small groups in all directions.

As they reached the crest of the hill they noted that Potgieter's commando was being pushed back by the marauding right horn. When they descended Italeni on the far side they noticed the left horn (black shields) rushing passed them on their right across the low neck towards the Reed creek where the Zulus planned to close the horns and trap the Voortrekkers. The Uys commando quickly realized their mistake and start to take flight, back across the kopje and the low neck towards the Reed creek.

Potgieter's attack

On his side Potgieter made what was reported as a "half-hearted" attack on the Zulu forces, and then retired. At first he diligently searched every garden, gulley and donga for possible hidden enemies. Watching the 2000 warriors closing in across the plain, he halted at the drift of the Nzololo stream. He ordered some 12-20 (sources vary) forward with strict instructions not to dismount. They closed the gap with the right horn and fired a volley which suddenly enraged the Zulu Impi. The Zulus charged with a cacophony of noise and the small party turned and fled back towards the drift. One man, Joseph Kruger, who dismounted against orders, was unable to mount his panicked horse and was killed within seconds'

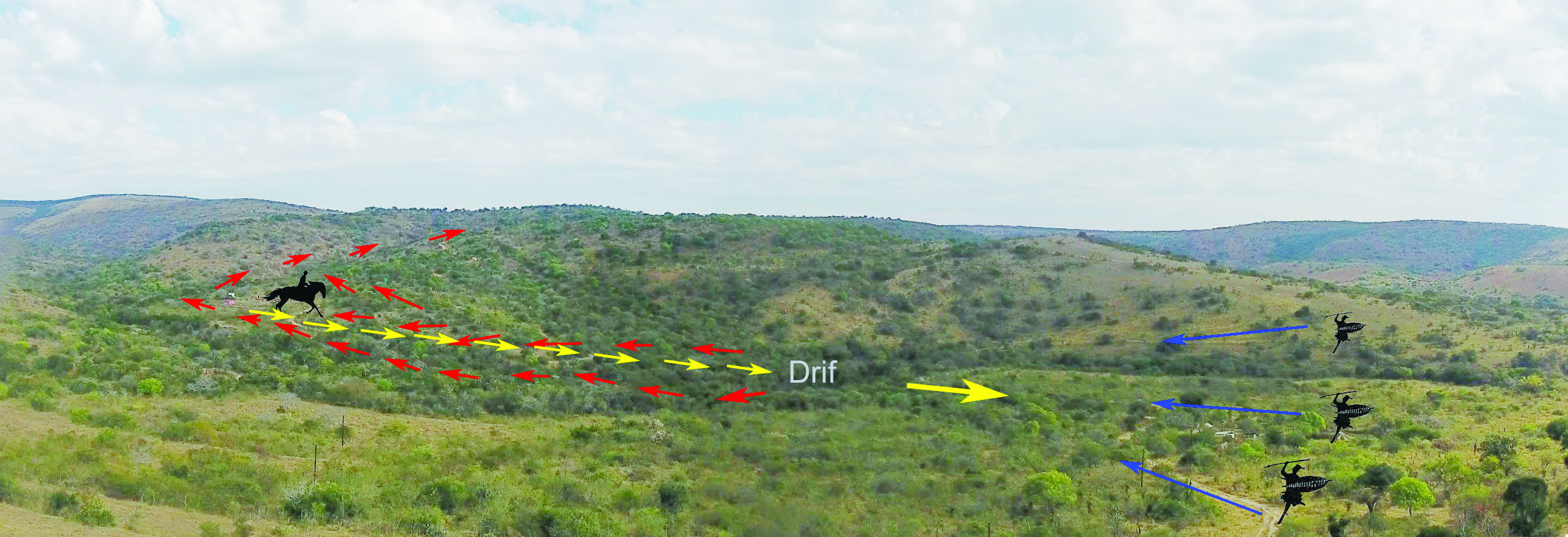
Potgieter's attack and flight route

The Potgieter commando rushed back towards their pack horses and some of the men got blocked in the Nzololo stream by a high rock wall. Bitter fighting took place but the men managed to stay on the western side of Nzololo stream and flee up along the pass from which they came. The right horn continued along the Nzololo stream and grabbed the Uys pack horses. Gert Rudolph, the voortrekker leader that had replaced the ailing Gert Maritz, rushed to Potgieter to request him to cover his rear. However, Potgieter ignored this request and continued retreating towards the top of the rim. The Zulus followed the trekkers towards the rim but turned when they saw the commando regrouping The action of sending Rudolph as a messenger to Potgieter almost certainly saved Rudolph's life.

Uys in trouble.

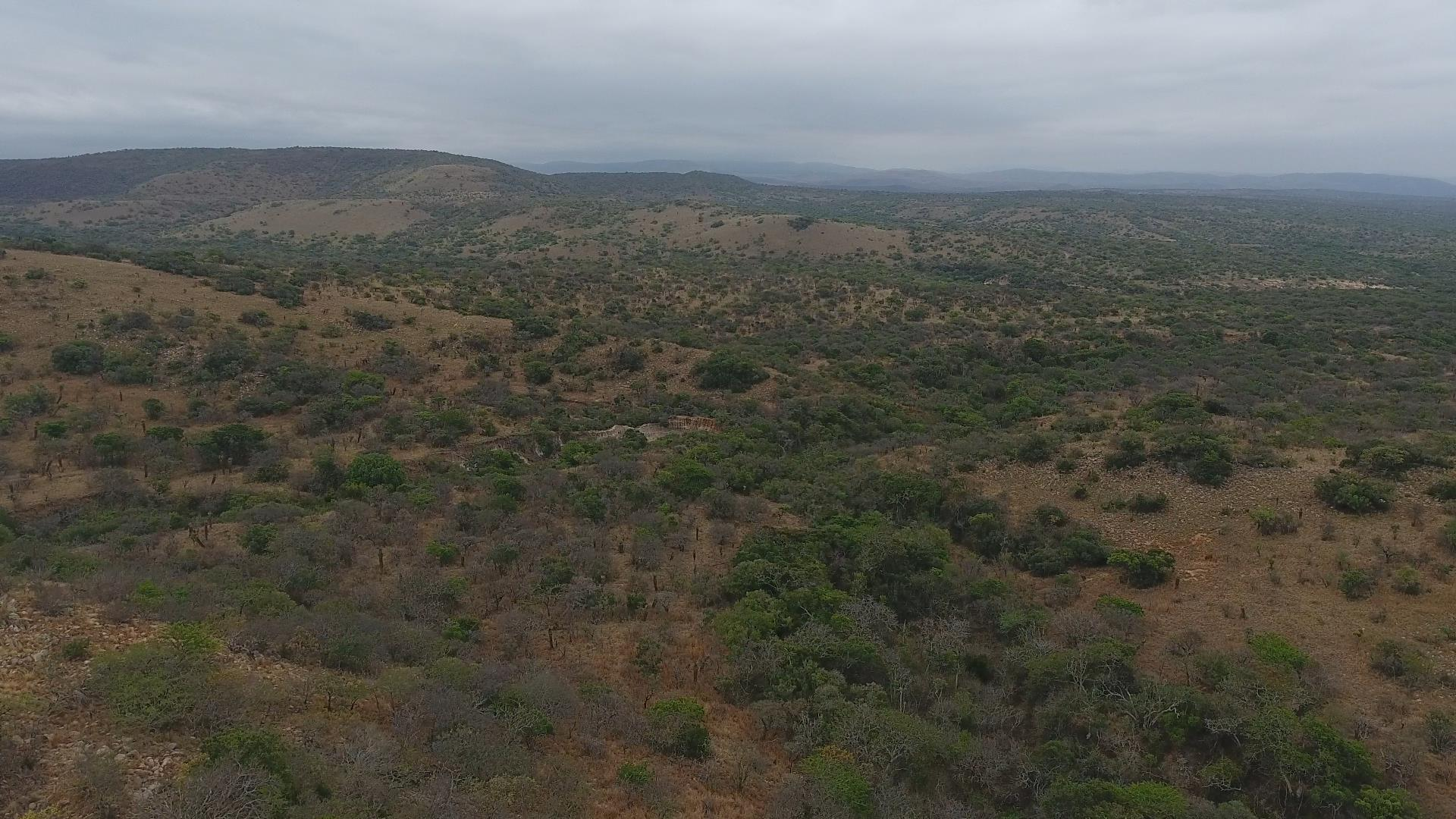
The area where Uys were wounded close to the two woody gulleys

Meanwhile, two members of Uys' party (the Malan brothers) had become isolated from the rest of the commando while pursuing the fleeing Zulus and were being led into an ambush in a bushy gorge. Seeing the danger they were in, Uys formed a party of fifteen volunteers (including his son, Dirkie) and rode to their rescue. The group of fifteen rode to the two bushy ravines in the opposite direction of the fleeing Voortrekkers. Uys and Jan Meyer halted briefly for Uys to adjust his flint. Suddenly two Zulus jumped from the tall grass and hurled their assagais. Meyer's horse was killed instantly and Piet Uys was severely wounded in his spleen and lungs. Blood poured from his wound and soon covered his horse's flank. Blood started to trickle from his nose and mouth. At first Uys helped Meyer on his horse, with Meyer's clothes immediately covered by the blood of Uys. Uys fainted due to the loss of blood and had to be revived. He had less than 8 minutes to live.

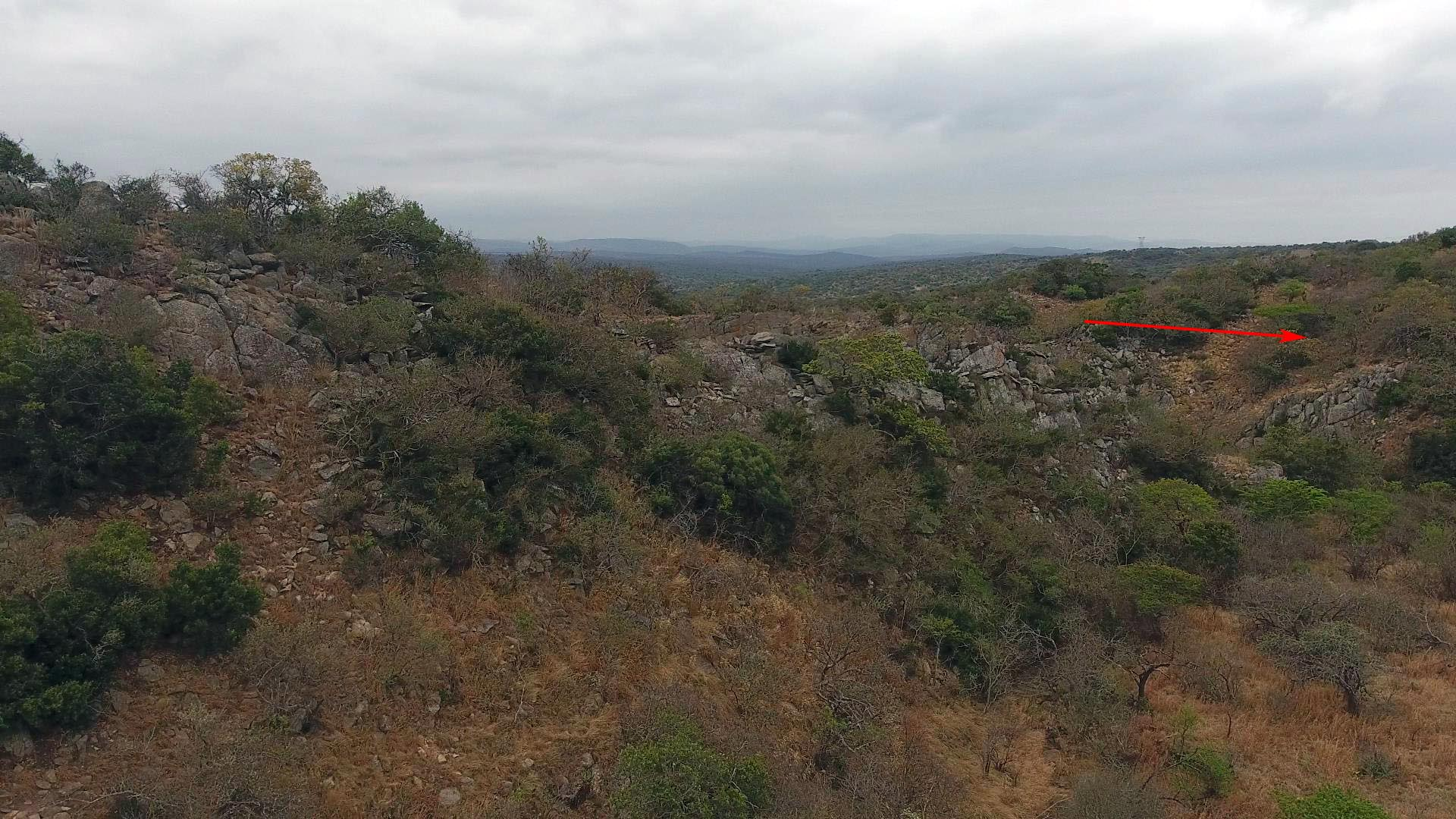
The rocky ridge as described by WG Nel

The group of fifteen struggled back towards the neck, constantly fighting. A rocky ridge briefly split their group in two with Uys now wedged between the brothers Moolman. The left horn now blocked any further advance and the Voortrekkers were forced to shoot a passage through the wall of Impis. The Malan brothers were killed here, before they were able to reach the crest of the neck. On the other side of the neck is the rocky downhill towards the Reed creek. Pieter Nel fell from his stumbling horse on the downhill and was killed before he could regain his horse, held by WG Nel. Uys and the Moolmans slowly travelled towards the creek where Uys fainted again. He was revived and helped across the creek. Here he fell from his horse for a final time and succumbed to his wounds. According to WG Nel and Louis Nel his son Dirkie was killed on the hill-side (northern) of the Reed creek.

Other reports, such as Boshof in Annals of Natal, avers that Dirkie Uys rushed about 100m back to where his father succumbed, and fought and died here alongside his stricken father.

The rest of the Uys commando fought bitterly and was hemmed in by the left horn coming from the neck and the right horn who was lurking in the Nzololo stream. Some Voortrekkers, such as Dawid Malan snr, Louis Nel and Theunis Nel were killed in fierce hand-to-hand combat in the area of the donga, just above the rockface in the Nzololo stream.

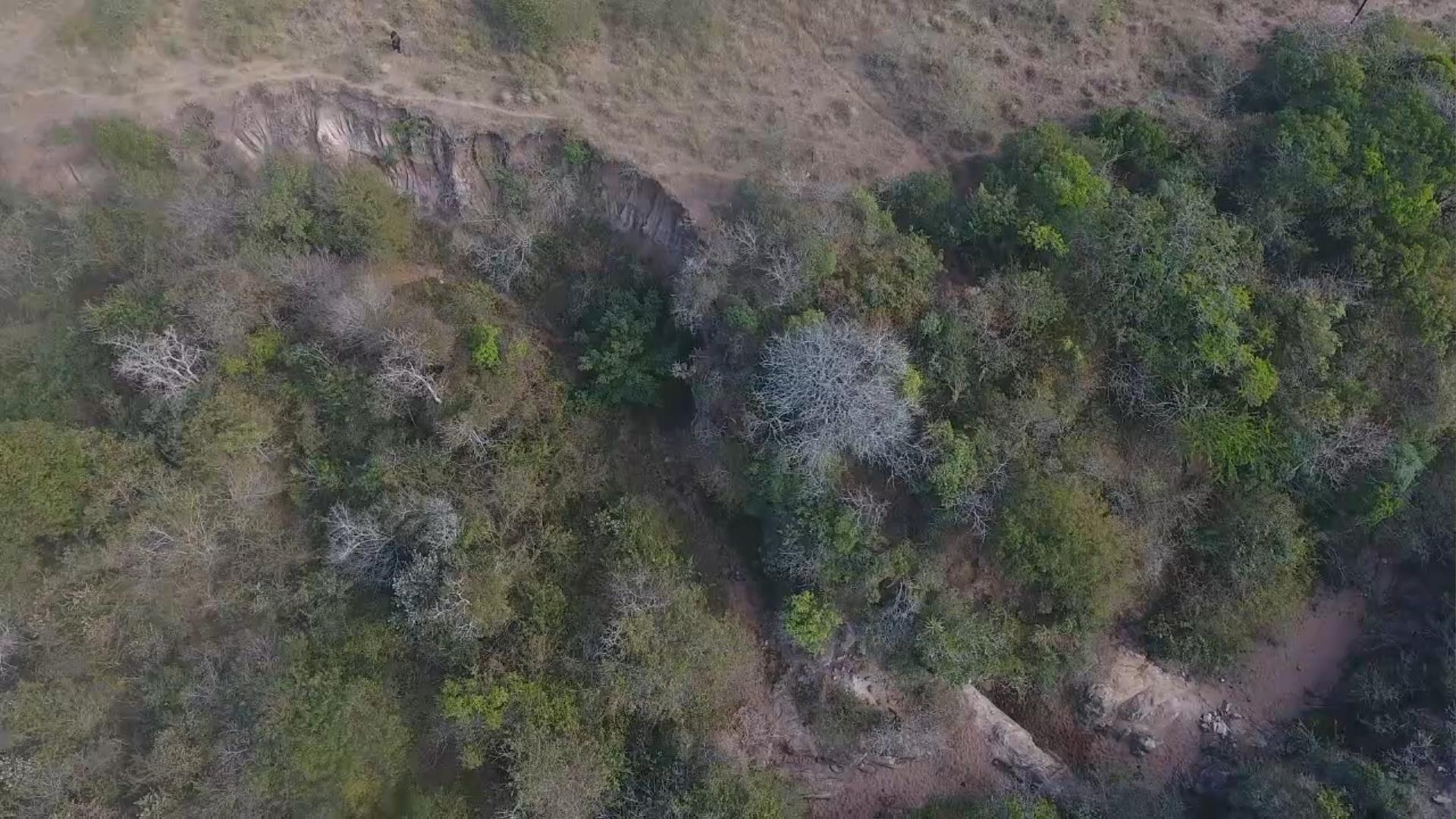
The rockwall on the bottom right hindered the flight of the Voortrekkers. Thereafter they were hemmed in by the high walls of the donga. Three Voortrekkers died here in hand to hand fighting.

The part of Uys' commando that remained behind (under the command of Field Cornet Potgieter), were surrounded and had to fight their way out. They raced along the eastern side of the Nzololo stream until they passed the first hill on their right and crossed the stream ascending towards the rim of the basin where they met up with Potgieter's men.

Due to the outcome of the battle, the Voortrekker forces involved in the fighting subsequently became known as the Vlugkommando (Flight Commando).

== Aftermath ==
The commandos returned to their camp on 12 April. During a subsequent meeting of the Voortrekkers, Potgieter was accused of cowardice and treachery for his refusal to endanger his commando in an attempt to rescue Uys' party. In vain, Potgieter argued that if he had attacked, he and his men would also have died at Italeni. In disgust at the cries of "traitor", Potgieter and his followers left and returned to the Orange Free State.

However, it has been speculated that, without the lessons learnt as a result of the Battle of Italeni - such as fighting from the shelter of ox-wagons whenever possible and choosing the place of battle rather than being enticed into unfavourable terrain - the Voortrekkers would not have succeeded in finally beating the Zulus at the Battle of Blood River eight months later.

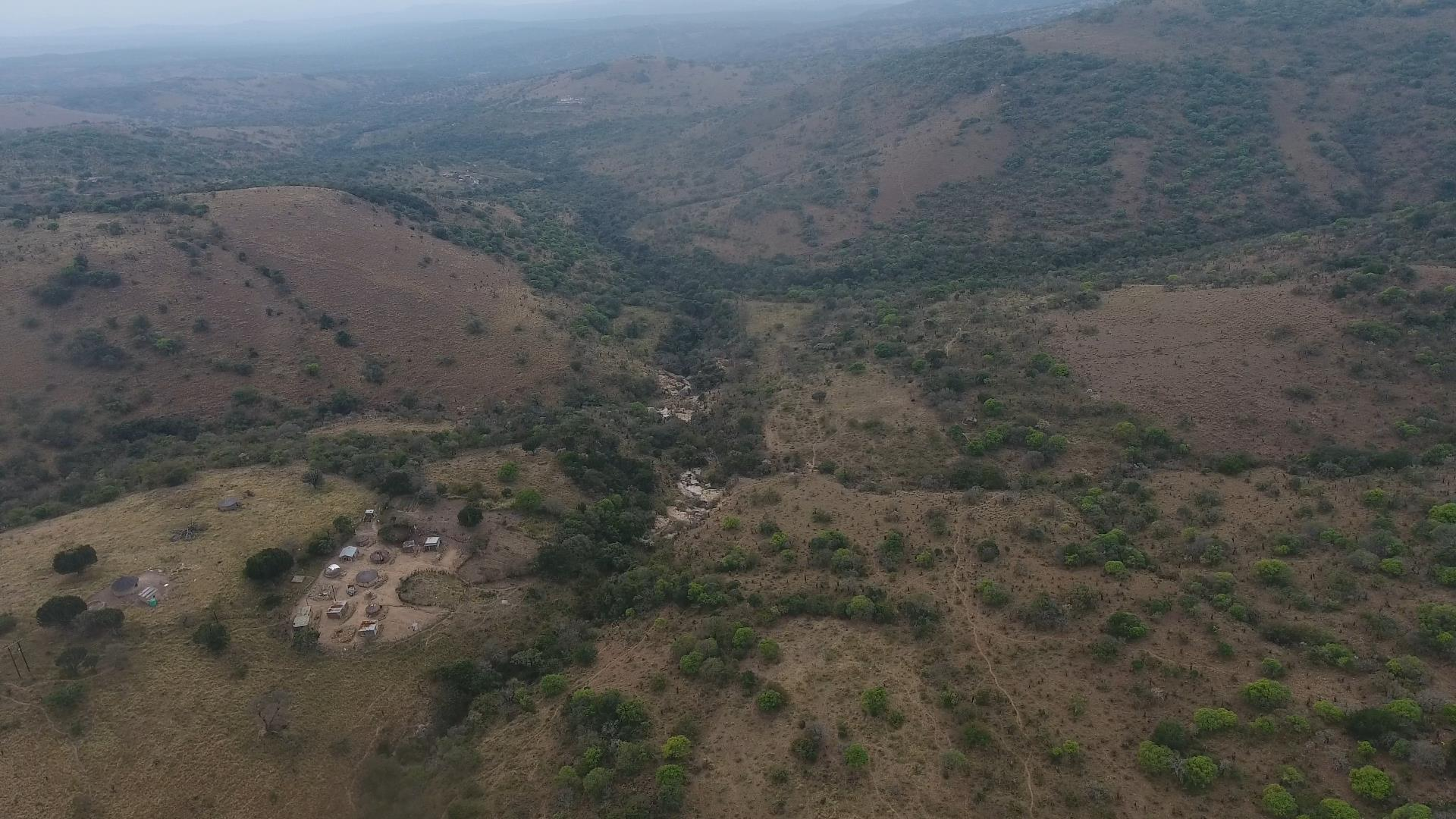
The rest of the Uys commando raced along the eastern side of the Nzololo stream (right) to continue by crossing the stream above another rock wall and ascending towards the rim of the basin using the gulley below the hill on the left.

== Site of the battle ==
The exact site of the battle was found 185 years after the battle together with seven Voortrekker graves. Further archeological research is planned to determine the identity of the buried remains.

Previously it has been speculated that the Zulus named it the "Battle of Italeni" as some of the fighting took place at Itala Mountain, 24 kilometres away. There is a place called Ithaleni or Ethaleni in Nkandla KwaZulu-Natal. The locals believe this is exactly where the 1838 battle took place. Here are places named from this hill. Ithala, Thaleni and Thalaneni.

Today, the site features two schools: Thalaneni Primary School and Ithala High School. A monument is erected at the hilltop.

== See also ==
- Military history of South Africa
