= Traditional South African Regiments =

South Africa has a number of Traditional Regiments. These are mostly South African Army Reserve Force (formerly Citizen Force) regiments that were established either under previous governments which have continued to exist by accepting the authority of the government-of-the-day.

Generally, the traditional regiments are those who were formed before the establishment of South Africa as a unified country, although there are a few which are much more recent. The traditional regiments have a number of elements which are different from the other units, such as certain peculiarities of dress. The most noticeable of these is the wearing of the Sam Browne belt and Sword by officers.

== Western Cape ==
The Traditional Cape Regiments are the five traditional South African Army Reserve Force (formerly Citizen Force) regiments of Cape Town, South Africa which are, in order of precedence:

- Cape Field Artillery (1857- )
- Cape Garrison Artillery (1942- )
- Cape Town Rifles (Dukes) (1855- )
- Cape Town Highlanders (1885- )
- Regiment Westelike Provinsie (1934- )

Brief profiles, in chronological order - see also individual articles on the regiments.

=== Cape Town Rifles (Dukes) ===
Formed as a volunteer corps in 1855. Served in the 9th Frontier War (1877–78), the Transkei (1879), and the Basutoland Gun War (1880–81). Served in the Bechuanaland Campaign (1897). Served in the Anglo-Boer War (1899-1902). Awarded a King's Colour in 1904. Embodied in the Citizen Force of the Union Defence Forces in 1913. In World War I, served in the German South West Africa Campaign (1915). The Earl of Athlone was colonel-in-chief 1930-57. In World War II, served in the East Africa Campaign (1940–41), the North Africa Campaign (1941–42), and the Italy Campaign (1945). Granted the Freedom of the City of Cape Town in 1967. Served in the Border War (1977–89), and the State of Emergency (1985–90).

=== Cape Field Artillery ===
Formed as a volunteer corps in 1857. Served in the 9th Frontier War (1877–78), the Northern Border Campaign (1878–79), and the Transkei Campaign (1880–81). Served in the Bechuanaland Campaign (1897). Served in the Anglo-Boer War (1899-1902). Awarded a King's Colour (a rare honour for artillery) in 1905. Embodied in the Citizen Force of the Union Defence Forces in 1913. In World War I, served in the 1914 Rebellion and the German South West Africa Campaign (1915). In World War II, served in the East Africa Campaign (1940–41), the North Africa Campaign (1941–42), and the Italy Campaign (1944–45). Granted the Freedom of the City of Cape Town in 1967. Served in the Angola Campaign (1976), the Border War (1977-89), and the State of Emergency (1985–90).

=== Cape Town Highlanders ===
Formed as a volunteer corps in 1885. Served in the Bechuanaland Campaign (1897). Served in the Anglo-Boer War (1899-1902). Awarded a King's Colour in 1904. The Duke of Connaught was colonel-in-chief 1908-42. Embodied in the Citizen Force of the Union Defence Forces in 1913. In World War I, served in the German South West Africa Campaign (1915). In World War II, served in the North Africa Campaign (1941–43) and the Italy Campaign (1944–45). Queen Elizabeth the Queen Mother was colonel-in-chief 1948-61. Granted the Freedom of the City of Cape Town in 1967. Served in the Angola Campaign (1976), the Border War (1977-89), and the State of Emergency (1985–90).

=== Regiment Westelike Provinsie ===
Formed as a Citizen Force unit in Stellenbosch in 1934, and regards itself as successor to various volunteer units which existed in that district in the 19th century. In World War II, volunteers from RWP served with the South African Tank Corps in the North Africa Campaign (1941–42). Moved to Paarl in 1948, and converted to armour in 1949. Reverted to infantry in 1960. Divided into two battalions in 1970, the 1st battalion moved to Cape Town in 1974. Served in the Angola Campaign (1976), the Border War (1977-89), and the State of Emergency (1985–90). Awarded the Freedom of the City of Cape Town.

=== Cape Garrison Artillery ===
Originally three Citizen Force anti-aircraft batteries, formed in the South African Air Force when home defences were reorganised in 1942. Transferred to the South African Artillery in 1949, and to the South African Corps of Marines in 1951. Reverted to the SA Artillery in 1955 and amalgamated into a single unit, 4 Heavy Anti-Aircraft Regiment. Affiliated with the University of Cape Town in 1960, and renamed 'UCT Regiment'. Adopted the name (and, apparently, the heritage) of an earlier coast artillery regiment, the Cape Garrison Artillery, in 1974. Served in the Angola Campaign (1976), the Border War (1977-89), and the State of Emergency (1985–90). Granted the Freedom of the City of Cape Town.

== Kwa-Zulu Natal ==
There are a number of Traditional Units in Kwa-Zulu Natal. These include:

- The Natal Carbineers
- Durban Light Infantry
- Natal Mounted Rifles
- Umvoti Mounted Rifles
- Durban Regiment
- Natal Field Artillery
- Traditional structure

== Gauteng ==
- Witwatersrand Rifles
- Transvaal Scottish Regiment
- South African Irish Regiment
- Light Horse Regiment

== See also ==
- Castle of Good Hope
