= Dirkie Uys =

Voortrekker hero (1823–1838)

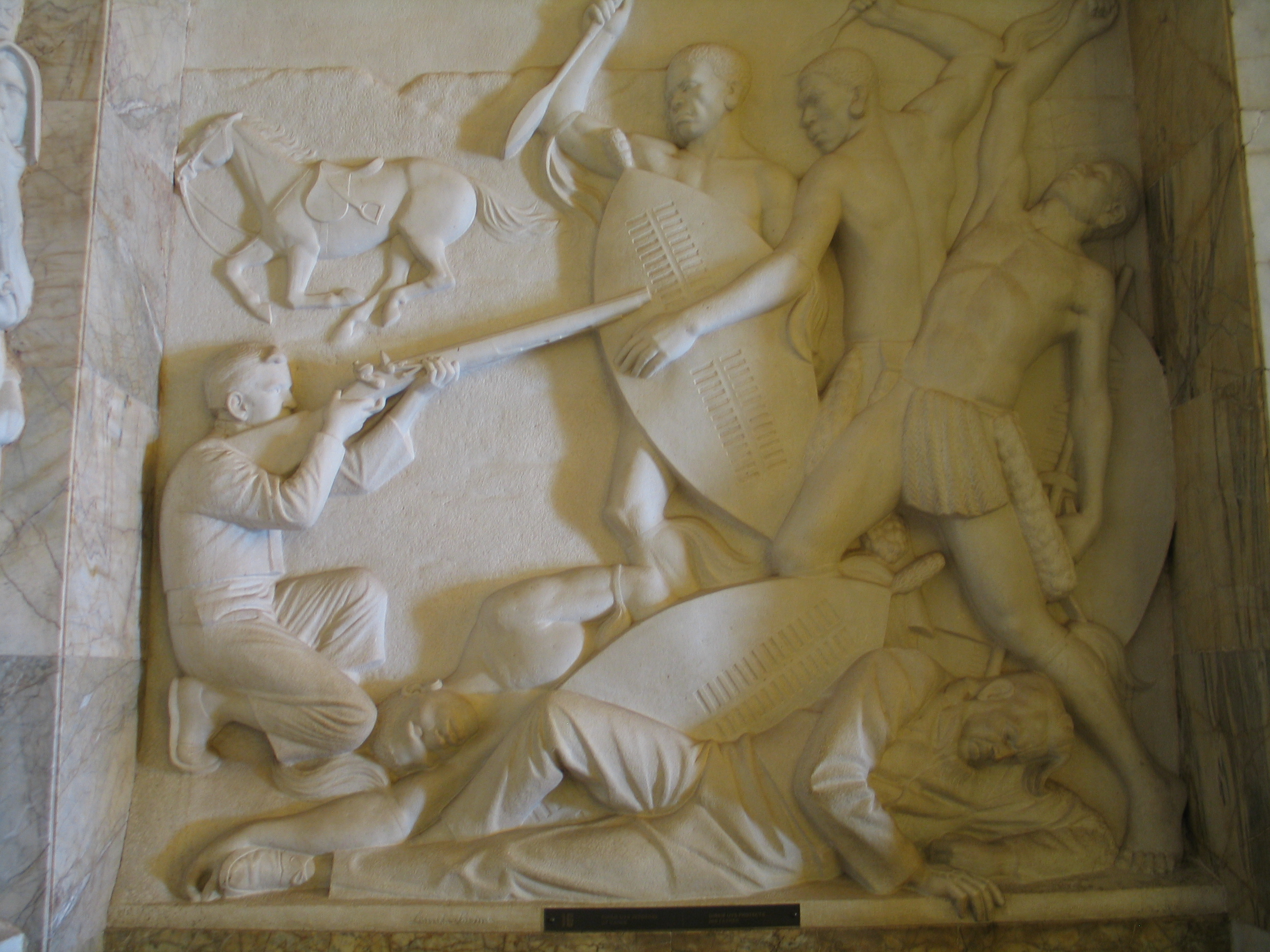
Frieze from the Voortrekker Monument depicting Dirkie Uys defending his father Piet Uys in the Battle of Italeni.

Dirk Cornelis "Dirkie" Uys (3 March 1823 – 9 April 1838) was a Voortrekker hero during the Great Trek.

Uys was born in Swellendam in 1823, the son of Petrus Lafras Uys and Alida Maria Uys.

After the massacre of Piet Retief and his men by Dingaan on 6 February 1838, a number of Voortrekker camps were also attacked by the Zulu impis. These Voortrekkers appealed to other treks, particularly those of Piet Uys and Hendrik Potgieter in the Orange Free State, for help. Both treks send out commandos to help, including Uys' fifteen-year-old son, Dirkie. During the subsequent Battle of Italeni, Piet Uys was mortally wounded by an assegai while riding to the rescue of two of his cornered men. The rescue party failed.

Opinions of what happened next differ: According to the most common version (mostly told by people who had not been present at the battle), Dirkie Uys was ahead of his father with most of the party when he heard his father ordering one of his men to leave him where he had fallen. Seeing the Zulus closing in on his father, Dirkie Uys turned around his horse, shouting "I will die with my father", and charged. He shot three Zulu warriors, briefly forcing them to retreat, but they rushed at him and stabbed him off his horse. Dirkie Uys fell beside his father, where they were both stabbed to death. This version of events is depicted on one of the historical friezes of the Voortrekker Monument.

== Sources ==
- Ian S. Uys, "The Battle of Italeni", South African Military History Society.
