= Piet Uys =

Voortrekker leader (1797–1838)

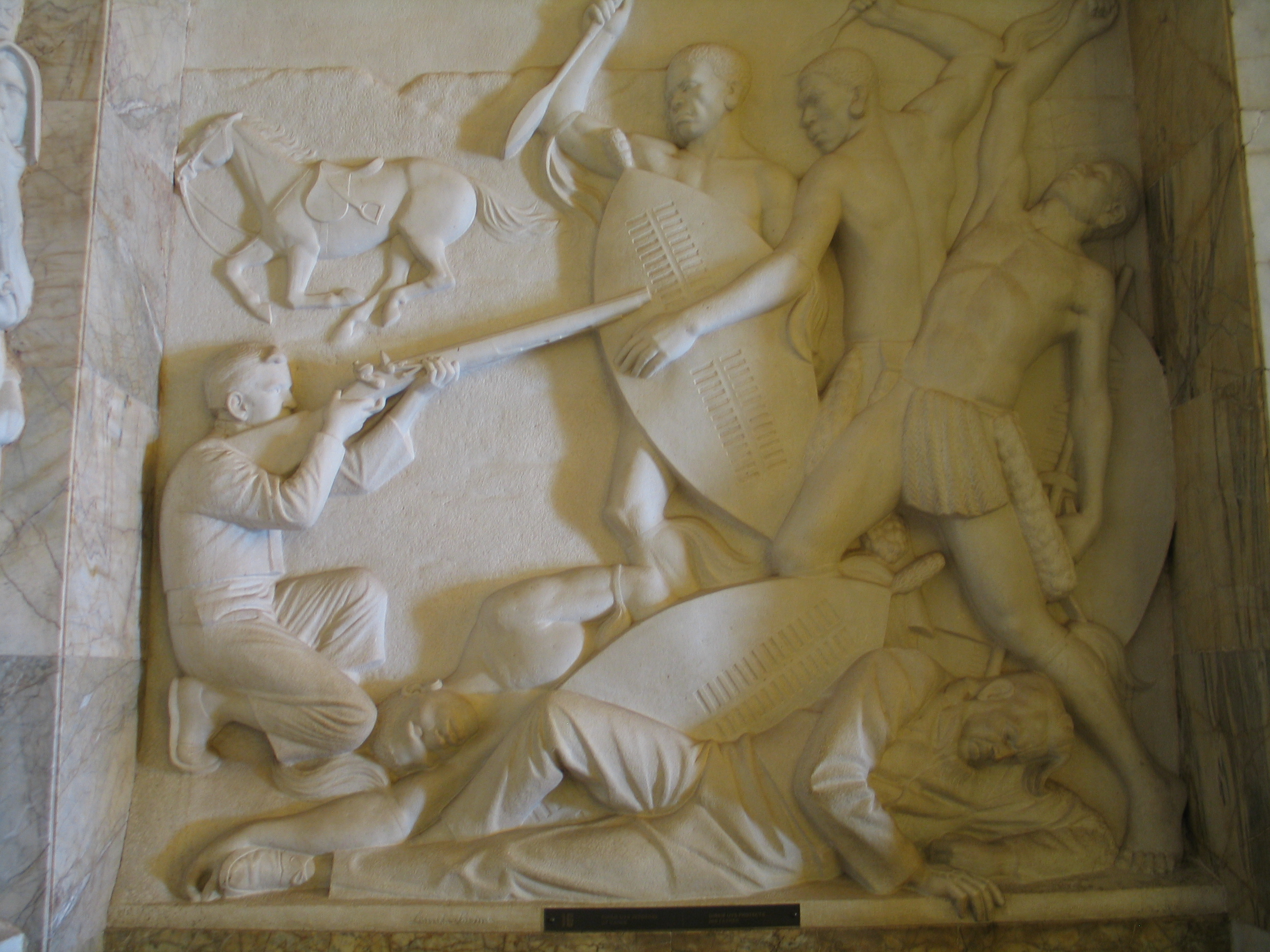
- Piet Uys and his son Dirkie, dying in battle; a frieze of the Voortrekker Monument
- Born: Potberg, Swellendam district
- Baptised: October 23, 1797
- Died: April 11, 1838 (aged 40); Italeni, UmGungundlovu
- Resting place: Uysdoorns, Pietermaritzburg reburied: Weltevrede, Utrecht
- Occupation: Commandant
- Successor: Jacobus Johannes “Cobus” Uys, younger brother
- Spouse: Alida Maria Uys
- Children: “Kruppel” Koos (1819–1886); Dirk Cornelis (1823–1838); Petrus Lafras “Piet Hlobane” (1827–1879)
- Parent(s): Jacobus Johannes “Koos Bybel” Uys (1770–1838); Susanna Margaretha Moolman

Petrus Lafras Uys (more commonly known as Piet Uys) (baptises October 23, 1797 – April 11, 1838) was a Voortrekker leader during the Great Trek.

== Early life ==
He was born in Swellendam, the third son (of six) of Jacobus Johannes Uys (nicknamed Koos Bybel (Bible) because of his religious beliefs), and was baptised on October 23, 1797. In 1823, Piet Uys moved to a farm in the Humansdorp area near Uitenhage together with his father.

Uys married a cousin, Alida Maria Uys, in 1815. The couple had three sons. He was described as a "well-spoken, intelligent man" with a wide circle of friends, including the Governor of the Cape Colony, Sir Benjamin d'Urban and Colonel Harry Smith. His conduct during the Cape Frontier wars led him to assume a leadership role at the relatively young age of 37. As a result of this, Uys was chosen to lead the "Commission Trek" to Natal in 1834, where he visited Port Natal and may also have met Dingane.

== Pioneer ==
After this successful scouting expedition, the party returned to Uitenhage in February 1835. The subsequent favourable reports of the Commission Treks resulted in many farmers leaving their farms and trekking into the interior of Southern Africa, in what later became known as the Great Trek. Uys sold his own farm in December 1836 and left the Uitenhage area with his party of 100 Voortrekkers (as they became known) in April 1837.

On 29 June, the Uys Trek arrived at the combined Voortrekker laager at the Sand River where, unbeknownst to them, Piet Retief had been elected Governor and a constitution drafted. Uys refused to accept either and insisted that, once they had reached Natal, democratic elections should be held. He also proposed a constitution based on that of the United States of America.

Uys then received a request by Andries Potgieter to help him against the Matabeles and their leader, Mzilikazi, who had recently stole all his cattle at the Battle of Vegkop. A commando led by Uys responded, and their combined forces eventually drove the Matabeles into what is now the country of Zimbabwe, opening up the Highveld area for future settlement.

On their return to the laager, the men found that Retief had already left for Natal. Uys and Potgieter subsequently travelled with a scouting party to Natal to visit Retief, but left for what later became known as the Orange Free State after being made to feel unwelcome.

== Warrior ==
However, after the massacre of Retief and his men by Dingane and the subsequent Zulu attacks on the Voortrekker laagers in Natal, commandos led by Uys and Potgieter rode to their aid. During the subsequent Battle of Italeni both Uys and his second son, Dirkie, were killed. The part of Uys' commando that remained behind (under the command of Field Cornet Potgieter), were surrounded and had to fight their way out. Due to the outcome of the battle, the Voortrekker forces involved in the fighting subsequently became known as the Vlugkommando(Flight Commando). Uys was to be the only Voortrekker leader to be killed in battle during the Great Trek. In retaliation the Voortrekkers formed the Vegkommando (Fight commando) which decisively defeated the Zulu in the Battle of Blood River.

== Legacy ==
Uys and his son Dirkie are rendered in the marble friezes of the Voortrekker Monument in Pretoria.
