= Battle of Umm al-Shaftir =

Italian battle in Libya, year 1927

- Part of Second Italo-Senussi War
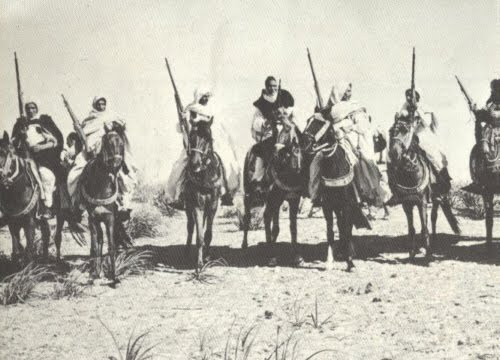
- Omar al-Mukhtar with his soldiers.
Date	April 27–28, 1927
Location	Aqira Umm al-Shaftir, Libya
Result	Italian victory

Belligerents
Italy	Senussiya

Commanders and leaders
Unknown	Omar al-Mukhtar

Strength
5,000 soldiers, 2,000 mules and 1,000 camels	1,500–2,000 men, 12,000 camels

Casualties and losses
Unknown, light	200 Senussi killed

The Battle of Umm al-Shaftir was a battle that took place on April 27 and April 28, 1927, between an Italian force of 2,000 mules, 5,000 soldiers, and 1,000 camels, in addition to armored and transport vehicles, and a Senussi rebel force of between 1,500 and 2,000 men, approximately 25% of whom were cavalry, accompanied by approximately 12,000 camels.

== Background ==
On March 28, 1927, the Battle of Al-Rahiba took place, in which the Italians attempted to invade Dur al-Ubaidat and Jardas al-ʽAbid in eastern Libya to eliminate the Libyan Mujahideen forces there. However, the operation failed, and the Italian forces were defeated and suffered heavy losses, amounting to about half their total. This greatly raised the morale of the Libyan revolutionaries and caused an uproar among the Italian leadership. In response, the Italians decided to launch a new campaign to restore their reputation and prestige after the defeat.

== Battle ==
When Al-Mukhtar learned what the Italians were planning, he began preparing with the rest of the jihad leaders to meet the enemy. They prepared a war plan and dug trenches for the Mujahideen to hide in, and other trenches for families of women, children, and the elderly. The Mujahideen were arranged in groups according to their tribal affiliation, and the families of each tribe were placed behind their fighting men. The commander of that battle was Sheikh Hussein Al-Juwaifi Al-Barasi, while Omar Al-Mukhtar fought alongside other fighters who did not have ranks. It wasn't long before the Mujahideen clashed with the Italians in a fierce battle. Many Libyan men, including women and children, fell after fascist aircraft bombed their positions. Al-Mukhtar and the others decided to retreat after the heavy losses. The number of Libyan dead reached 200, including Omar Al-Mukhtar's father-in-law, who wept bitterly and said after hearing of his death:

"They are all gone, oh eyes of the neighbors and the dear ones."

After the battle ended, the Italian forces were exhausted and fatigued from the intensity of the long, non-stop fighting. The battle revealed to Omar al-Mukhtar the features of the new fascist policy, namely the extermination and destruction of interests and men alike. He took measures to deport women, children, and the elderly to Sallum to protect them from Italian air raids and to facilitate the movement of the Mujahideen according to the requirements of the new situation. He also reorganized the Mujahideen into small teams that would engage with the enemy when necessary and occupy him most of the time, thus reducing the rate of local losses during battles and inflicting heavy losses on the enemy according to the new tactic of guerrilla warfare, namely attacking at the appropriate time and withdrawing when necessary. In addition, Al-Mukhtar realized the necessity of working to publicize the Libyan cause and the Libyan struggle against Italy in Islamic and European countries alike, so he asked some of the mujahideen to emigrate abroad to publicize the cause in the countries where they resided, and the result of this was the formation of Libyan communities abroad.

== Consequences ==
The battle led to Italy regaining its prestige in the region after it had lost it as a result of the Battle of al-Rahiba. It also demonstrated the rebels' inability to confront the Italian army in an open battle, army against army. After that, the rebels began to abandon their bases when the Italians approached, and returned to the previous method of hit-and-run and intermittent raids, after the experience of Rahiba had given them the courage to confront the large Italian forces.

== See also ==
- Battle of Gasr Bu Hadi
- Battle of Safsaf
- Battle of Wadi Marsit
- Battle of Bir Tabraz
- Battle of Bir Bilal
- First Battle of Sidi Abu Arqub

== Literature ==
- Manaa, Muhammad Abd al-Razzaq (1972). The roots of the Arab struggle in Libya (in Arabic). Dar Maktaba Al-Fikr. Archived from the original on March 12, 2025.
- Teruzzi, Attilio (1931). Cirenaica verde: due anni di governo, dicembre 1926-gennaio 1929 (in Italian). A. Mondadori. Archived from the original on March 12, 2025.
- Ziadeh, Nicola (1950). Barqa, the eighth Arab state (in Arabic). Dar Al-Ilm Lil-Malayin. Archived from the original on March 12, 2025.
- Dawi, Ali Abdel Rahman (1984). "Publications of the Libyan Jihad Center for Historical Studies (1978–2006)". Journal of Historical Research (in Arabic). Libyan Center for Archives and Historical Studies. Archived from the original on April 23, 2014.
