= List of reduplicated Chilean place names =

This is a list of places in Chile with reduplicated names, often as a result of the grammatical rules of the Mapuche language from which many of the names derive. It is common for reduplicated Mapuche words to have suffixes.

== Place names ==
- Bío Bío River, Biobío and Araucanía regions
- Calle-Calle River, Los Ríos Region
- Caucau River, Los Ríos Region
- Chan-Chan, Los Ríos Region
- Chan Chan (forest), Los Lagos and Los Ríos regions
- Chan Chan Airport, Los Ríos Region
- Chinchin River, Los Lagos Region
- Chiu Chiu, Antofagasta Region
- Cholchol, Araucanía Region
- Cholchol River, Araucanía Region
- Concón, Valparaíso Region
- Cuz Cuz, Coquimbo Region
- Golgol River, Los Lagos Region
- Huilo-Huilo Falls, Los Ríos Region
- Estero Huiñahuiña, Los Ríos Region
- Estero Lipelipe, Biobío Region
- Fundo Chan Chan, Los Ríos Region
- Llay-Llay, Valparaíso Region
- Estero Llay-Llay, Los Lagos Region
- Estero Llaullau, Araucanía Region
- Lleulleu Lake, Biobío Region
- Lleulleu River, Biobío and Araucanía regions
- Estero Lliu-Lliu, Valparaíso Region
- Marga Marga, Valparaíso Region
- Pille Cozcoz River, Los Ríos Region
- Estero Quilquilco, Biobío and Araucanía regions
- Taltal, Antofagasta Region
- Temucuicui, Araucanía Region
- Tiltil, Santiago Metropolitan Region
- Estero de Trapa Trapa, Biobío Region
- Estero Truftruf, Araucanía Region
- Estero Trentren, Araucanía Region
- Estero Traitraico, Araucanía Region

== See also ==
- List of reduplicated place names
- List of reduplicated Australian place names
- List of reduplicated New Zealand place names

== Sources ==
- Palabras repetidas (in Spanish)
