= List of reduplicated place names =

This is a list of places with reduplication in their names, often as a result of the grammatical rules of the languages from which the names are derived.

Duplicated names from the indigenous languages of Australia, Chile and New Zealand are listed separately and excluded from this page.

== Place names ==
- Alangalang, Leyte, Philippines
- Alang-alang, Mandaue, Philippines
- Arar, Saudi Arabia
- Baden-Baden, Germany
- Banaybanay, Davao Oriental, Philippines
- Banay-Banay, Cabuyao, Philippines
- Barbar, Bahrain
- Baubau, Southeast Sulawesi, Indonesia
- Bela-Bela, Limpopo Province, South Africa
- Bella Bella, British Columbia, Canada
- Benabena, Papua New Guinea
- Berber, Sudan
- Bidbid, Oman
- Blup Blup, Papua New Guinea
- Bongbong, Philippines
- Bora Bora, French Polynesia
- Botbot, Pandan, Philippines
- Bud Bud, West Bengal, India
- Budge Budge, West Bengal, India
- Bulbul, Syria
- Bulo Bulo, Bolivia
- Carcar, Philippines
- Cárcar, Spain
- Cascas, Peru
- Cece, Hungary
- Chak Chak, Yazd, Iran
- Chake-Chake, Tanzania
- Dandan, Saipan, Northern Marianas Islands
- Dapdap, Philippines
- Den Den, Tunisia
- Dian Dian, Guinea
- Dum Dum, West Bengal, India
- Est! Est!! Est!!! di Montefiascone, Italy, a wine region
- Fakfak, West Papua, Indonesia
- Fengfeng Mining District, Hebei, China
- Gan Gan, Argentina
- Gargar, Armenia: not an actual reduplication in Armenian, as the two ‘r’ sounds are different in this place name and are spelled using different letters.
- Gergere, Turkey, an ancient town lying on the eastern frontier of the Cappadocia satrapy
- Gergeri, Crete, Greece, named after the Anatolian Gergere, during the 10th-century Orthodox colonization of the island
- Gilgil, Kenya
- Gode Gode, Tanzania
- Gorom-Gorom, Burkina Faso
- Guagua, Pampanga, Philippines
- Gya'gya, Tibet, China
- Hhohho Region, Eswatini
- Hibhib, Iraq
- Holhol, Djibouti
- Hualca Hualca, Mexico
- Hum Hum, Bangladesh
- Humayhumay, Philippines
- 'Ili'ili, on Tutuila island, American Samoa
- Iloilo (city) and Iloilo (province), Philippines
- Irong-Irong, Iloilo Province, Philippines
- Jaghjagh River, Turkey and Syria
- Jala-jala, Rizal, Philippines
- Jiji, Nantou, Taiwan
- Kankan, Guinea
- Kapa Kapa, also known as Gabagaba, Papua New Guinea
- Karkar Island, Papua New Guinea
- Kerker, Tunisia
- Kila Kila, Papua New Guinea
- Kinnickinnic River, Wisconsin (a tributary of the Milwaukee River)
- Kinnickinnic River, Wisconsin (a tributary of the St. Croix River)
- Kirakira, Solomon Islands
- Kirikiri, Japan
- Kongkong River, South Sudan
- Külaküla, Estonia
- Kwekwe, Zimbabwe
- Lala, Lanao del Norte, Philippines
- Langa Langa Lagoon, Solomon Islands
- Layang-Layang Island, Sabah, Malaysia
- Layang-Layang, Johor, Malaysia
- Lapu-Lapu, Philippines
- Lolo, Montana, United States
- Lomaloma, Fiji
- Loop Loop, Washington, United States
- Lulu City, Colorado, United States
- Mukomuko, Bengkulu, Indonesia
- Musmus, Israel
- Ngorongoro, Tanzania
- Nimnim Lake, Vancouver Island, British Columbia, Canada
- Nono, Argentina
- Numa Numa, Papua New Guinea
- Onon River, Mongolia and Russia
- Oshkosh, Wisconsin, United States
- Pago Pago, American Samoa
- Pangpang, Philippines
- Pare-Pare, Sulawesi, Indonesia
- Paw Paw, Illinois, United States
- Paw Paw, Michigan, United States
- Paw Paw, West Virginia, United States
- Peʻepeʻe Falls, Hawaiʻi, United States
- Pee Pee Township, Ohio, United States
- Piripiri, Piauí, Brazil
- Phi Phi Islands, Thailand
- Puka-Puka, French Polynesia
- Pukapuka, Cook Islands
- Qarqar, Syria
- Quemú Quemú, Argentina
- QwaQwa, former Bantustan in South Africa; the name survives as the QwaQwa campus of the University of the Free State
- Raf Raf, Tunisia
- Rapu-Rapu, Philippines
- Safsaf, Algeria
- Safsaf, Mandatory Palestine
- Safsaf, Libya
- Saint-Louis-du-Ha! Ha!, Quebec, Canada
- Salm-Salm, Holy Roman Empire
- Sanga-Sanga, Philippines
- Sapa-Sapa, Tawi-Tawi, Philippines
- Sa'sa', Syria
- Savusavu, Fiji
- Shanshan, Xinjiang, China, is not actually a reduplicated place name; the Chinese name consists of two characters, 鄯善, that are homophonic but distinct
- Sing Sing, New York, United States
- Sipe Sipe, Cochabamba District, Bolivia
- Sipisopiso waterfall, North Sumatra, Indonesia
- Songsong, Northern Mariana Islands, United States
- Tabontabon, Leyte, Philippines
- Tal Tal, South Africa
- Talon-Talon, Philippines
- Tan-Tan, Morocco
- Taran Taran, Pakistan
- Tartar, Azerbaijan
- Tartar, Switzerland
- Tartar Island, Antarctica
- Tata, Hungary
- Tawi-Tawi, Philippines
- Taytay, Palawan, Philippines
- Taytay, Rizal, Philippines
- Tolitoli, Central Sulawesi, Indonesia
- Tipo-Tipo, Basilan, Philippines
- Torres Torres, Spain
- Tourtour, France
- Tsili Tsili, Papua New Guinea
- Tyatya, Russia
- Walewale, Ghana
- Walla Walla, Washington, United States
- Wangi-Wangi, Southeast Sulawesi, Indonesia
- Warawara Lake (Cochabamba), Bolivia
- Wawa, Ontario, Canada
- Wawa, Pennsylvania, United States
- Wawa, Pilar, Philippines
- Wawa, Sudan
- Wawa, Togo
- Xai-Xai, Mozambique
- Xique-Xique, Brazil
- Yaya River, Russia
- Zamzam Well, Mecca, Saudi Arabia
- Zarzar Lake, Syria
- Zaza Dam, Cuba
- Zaza Reservoir, Cuba
- Zanzan, Ivory Coast
- Zorzor, Liberia

== See also ==
- List of reduplicated Australian place names
- List of reduplicated Chilean place names
- List of reduplicated New Zealand place names
