= Battle of Safsaf =

Italian battle in Libya, year 1913

Date	1–2 July 1913
Location	Safsaf, Libya
Result	Senussi victory

Belligerents
Kingdom of Italy	Senussi

Commanders and leaders
(Kingdom of Italy) Major Pelli † (Kingdom of Italy) Major Meliaci †	Unknown

Strength
Unknown	300 men

Casualties and losses
8 officers killed 5 officers wounded 30 men killed 105 men wounded 64 missing (presumably dead)	Unknown

The Battle of Safsaf was fought in July 1913 between the Kingdom of Italy and Senussi forces in a place near Safsaf, Libya in modern Libya. The Senussi succeeded in defeating two Italian forces.

== Battle ==
On July 1, 1913, a company of construction engineers accompanied by an Italian force of infantry and artillery left their base in Cyrene for construction purposes to secure Italian communication lines between Italian bases and to prepare an attack on the Senussis bases. It wasn't long for the Italian force, which was marching towards Faydiya, to be attacked by the Libyans. Both sides began exchanging fire, and the Italian leader, Major Pelli, ordered a retreat. However, the Libyans surrounded the Italian force, destroying it alongside its leader, which contributed to its collapse. The battle happened at noon.

News reached Cyrene, and they began sending reinforcements at 6:00 p.m. Learning of this, the Senussis abandoned their attack on the former force and began heading towards the new force; they attacked the right wing. The Italian leader then ordered withdrawing to artillery positions, but this didn't happen only after the death of Major Meliaci and his helper; the Italians were left leaderless and withdrew to Safsaf, where the battle was centered.

The Italians called for help from their bases in Shaghab. The Italian general Giulio Cesare Tassoni prepared a large force, but it was forced to stop during their march at night, and at dawn they found the area completely empty with no Senussi to be spotted. The Senussi had only 300 men during the battle, but they were well disciplined. According to Italian reports, there were 8 killed and 5 wounded officers, 30 killed and 105 wounded men, and 64 missing who were considered dead.

== Literature ==
- Kalifa Tillisi, A Dictionary for Italian Colonial Battles on the Libyan Soil 1911–31, 1972.

== See also ==
- Battle of Bir Tabraz
- Battle of Al-Rahiba
- Battle of Wadi Marsit
- First Battle of Sidi Abu Arqub
