= North African theatre =

North African theatre may refer to:

- North African Theatre:
  - Egyptian Theatre
  - Tunisian Theatre
- North African theatre (World War I)
- North African theatre (World War II)
