= First Battle of Sidi Abu Arqub (1915) =

- Part of Senussi campaign
| Date | 13 May 1915 |
| Location | Tripoli, Libya |
| Result | Senussi victory |

Belligerents
| Senussi | Kingdom of Italy |

Commanders and leaders
| Masoud Al-Shweikh | Unknown |

Strength
| Unknown | 700 |

Casualties and losses
| Unknown | Most were killed 200 Captured |

The First Battle of Sidi Abu Urqub took place between the Senussi's and Italy on May 13, 1915.

An Italian battalion hailing from the strategic Azizia region embarked on a daring mission; their objective was to lift the siege between the Senussi and Italians in Tarhuna, more specifically in the Wadi Al-Kharrouba region.

In a subsequent attempt by the Italian forces to rescue their besieged troops in Tarhuna, a smaller force departed from the Azizia region. On Abu Urqub Mountain, towering a thousand feet high, a remarkable battle unfolded on May 13, 1915, between the Italian forces and the mujahideen led by Masoud Al-Shweik. The mujahideen achieved a clear victory, with most of the Italian forces being annihilated and around 200 Italian prisoners were captured.

Following the battle, the Italian prisoners were taken into captivity, marking a significant victory for the mujahideen and highlighting the resilience of their defense in the face of Italian attempts to rescue their besieged forces.

== See also ==
- Battle of Gasr Bu Hadi
- Battle of Safsaf
- Battle of Al-Rahiba
- Battle of Bir Tabraz
- Battle of Bir Bilal
- Battle of Wadi Marsit
