= Loop Loop, Washington =

Loop Loop
- Ghost town
- Location within the state of Washington Loop Loop (the United States)
- Coordinates: 48°27′5″N 119°42′48″W
- Country: United States
- State: Washington
- County: Okanogan
- Elevation: 3,540 ft (1,080 m)
- Time zone: UTC-8 (Pacific (PST))
  - Summer (DST): UTC-7 (PDT)
- GNIS feature ID: 1531337

Loop Loop was a small unincorporated community in Okanogan County, Washington, United States. According to the Geographic Names Information System, this is French for 'wolf wolf'. It was also known as Loup Loup.

== See also ==
- List of reduplicated place names
- List of ghost towns in Washington
