= Military operations in North Africa during World War I =

Series of conflicts during World War I

North African theatre of World War I
- Part of the First World War
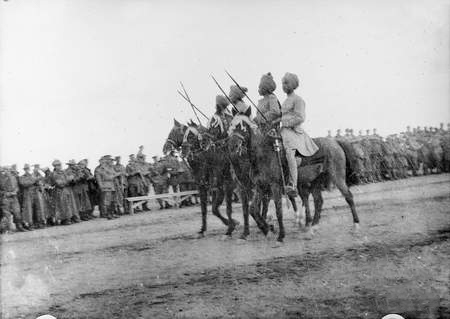
- Anglo-Indian troops of the Hyderabad Lancers in Egypt, 1916
Date	14 November 1915 – May 1916
Location	North Africa
Result	Allied victory

Belligerents
British Empire; Australia; Egypt; India; New Zealand; Somaliland; South Africa; France; French Tunisia; Morocco; Italy; Tripolitania; Cyrenaica	Germany; Ottoman Empire; Senussi Order; Sultanate of Darfur; Dervish Movement; Zaian Confederation; Zawiya Darqawiyya; Chaouia tribes; Other Moroccans; Supported: Ethiopian Empire (until 1916)

Commanders and leaders
William Peyton; Alexander Wallace; Henry Lukin; Henry Hodgson; Reginald Wingate; Philip Kelly; Louis-Hubert Lyautey; Paul Prosper Henrys; Joseph-François Poeymirau	Ja'far al-Askari; Abdurrahman Nafiz Bey; Nuri Bey; Sayyid Ahmed Sharif; Omar al-Mukhtar; Sultanate of Darfur Ali Dinar †; Mouha ou Hammou Zayani (surrendered); Moha ou Said; Ali Amhaouch #

Conflicts took place in North Africa during World War I (1914–1918) between the Central Powers and the Entente and its allies. On 14 November 1914, the Ottoman Sultan proclaimed a jihad. With support from Germany, he sought to create a diversion to draw British troops from the Sinai and Palestine Campaign and recover Libya, lost in the recent Italo-Turkish War. The Senussi of Libya sided with the Ottoman Empire and the German Empire against the British Empire and the Kingdom of Italy. The Senussi Campaign took place from 23 November 1915 to February 1917.

In the summer of 1915, the Ottoman Empire had persuaded the Grand Senussi Ahmed Sharif to attack British-occupied Egypt from the west, raise jihad and encourage an insurrection in support of an Ottoman offensive against the Suez Canal from the east. The Senussi crossed the Libyan–Egyptian border at the coast in November 1915. British imperial forces withdrew at first and then defeated the Senussi in several engagements, including the action of Agagia. The British recaptured the territory along the coast by March 1916, with the Western Frontier Force of the Egyptian Expeditionary Force, which included the 1st South African Infantry Brigade.

Further west, the inhabitants of areas recently conquered or seized by European powers from the Ottoman Empire, exploited the unsettled conditions caused by the war in Europe to regain control of their lands. Uprisings such as the Zaian War, Volta-Bani War and the Kaocen Revolt took place in Morocco and other parts of West Africa against the French colonialists, some of which lasted longer than the war. In Sudan, the Anglo-Egyptian Darfur Expedition took place against the Sultan of Darfur, who was believed to have prepared an invasion of Egypt, to be synchronised with Senussi operations on the western frontier. Operations by the British were conducted by small numbers of men equipped with motor vehicles, aircraft and wireless, which multiplied their effectiveness; the speed of their manoeuvres frequently enabled them to surprise their opponents.

== Background ==
=== German and Ottoman strategy ===
In 1914, the Central Powers began a peripheral strategy, which had antecedents in the concept of Weltpolitik, the thinking of the Imperial German Navy in the 1900s during the Anglo-German naval arms race, and in the writings of advocates of a German colonial empire. The possibility of encouraging revolutionary warfare among the peoples of the European colonial empires; Muslims, Irish, Jews, Poles, the peoples of the Baltic littoral, Ukrainians, Georgians and eventually the Bolsheviks, had considerable appeal. The founding of a great German empire was not contemplated, but military weakness in Europe led to an attempt to turn colonial inferiority into an advantage. On 20 August 1914, Moltke wrote to the Foreign Office, demanding Islamic revolutions in Morocco, Tunisia and Algeria. The means to bring about change in the non-European world were limited, with little expertise, few men and little equipment to spare from Europe and exiguous overland routes to the outside world.

Moltke expected diplomats to create pro-independence armies, as the Foreign Office pursued a pan-Islamic strategy, using the Ottoman Empire and its army as the means. The Ottomans entered the war to escape from European domination, rather than as a German proxy and had imperial ambitions in North Africa, Central Asia and the Near East. In October 1914, Enver Pasha devised a war plan which included a jihad and an invasion of Egypt. On 14 November 1914, Sheikh-ul-Islam declared holy war, called on all Muslims to fight the Entente and allied powers, but not Italy (which was neutral at the time), and excluded Muslims under the rule of Germany or Austria-Hungary. The Sheikh urged the peoples of the European colonial empires to join in, a message which reached North, East and West Africa. Enver ordered the Teskilat-i Mahsusa (Special Organisation) to conduct propaganda, subversion, terrorism and sabotage, based on the precedent of the war in Libya against the Italians.

=== Allied strategy ===
European colonial powers had apprehensions about the possibility of jihad before 1914; Clemenceau had predicted it in 1912, if war broke out between the Great Powers. In August 1914, Charles Lutaud, the Governor of Algeria expected a rebellion and on 5 November, tried to forestall the Ottoman call to arms, by presenting the Ottomans as German puppets. The French were assisted by Royal Navy code breaking, to anticipate landings from German U-boats and negate the intriguing of the Central Powers. French prestige after the Moroccan Crises reduced the likelihood of attempts to overthrow the colonial regime and German prisoners of war, were used as forced labour in Morocco and Algeria, to display French military prowess. Most of the French regular troops were sent to France in 1914 and replaced by Territorial troops in Morocco but on the frontier of Algeria and Libya, Senussi operations against the Italian army led the French to allow the garrisons of Ghadames and Ghat to retreat into Algeria and then be rearmed to re-capture Ghadames in January 1915, as part of the French policy of drawing Italy into the war.

=== North Africa in 1914 ===
Before 1906, when the Senussi became involved in resistance against the French, they had been a "relatively peaceful religious sect of the Sahara Desert, opposed to fanaticism". When the Italians invaded Libya in 1911, occupying the coast, the Senussi resisted the Italians from the interior of the country. During their resistance against the Italians, the Senussi maintained generally friendly relations with the British in Egypt. The region had been annexed by Italy in 1911 after the Italo-Turkish War and by France in 1912 and control had not been consolidated by the Italians when the war began in Europe. After the loss of the province of Trablusgarp to Italy in the war of 1911–1912, the local Sanusi people continued with their resistance against the Italians. Fighting was conducted by Sanusi militia under the leadership of Ahmed al-Sharif, whose followers in Fezzan (southwest Libya) and southern Tripolitania prevented Italian consolidation their hold on these regions. The Ottoman government never ceased to provide assistance to the local tribesmen in the region.

== Military operations ==
=== Morocco ===
==== Zaian War, 1914–1921 ====
Attempts were made by Germany and the Ottomans to influence conditions in the French colonies, by intriguing with potentates who had been ousted by the French. Spanish authorities in the region informally tolerated the distribution of propaganda and money but a German plot to smuggle 5,000 rifles and 500,000 bullets through Spain was thwarted. The Teskilat-i Mahsusa maintained several agents in North Africa but had only two in Morocco. The Zaian War was fought between France and the Zaian confederation of Berber tribes in French Morocco between 1914 and 1921. Morocco had become a French protectorate in 1912 and the French army extended French influence eastwards through the Middle Atlas mountains towards French Algeria. The Zaians, led by Mouha ou Hammou Zayani quickly lost the towns of Taza and Khénifra but managed to inflict many casualties on the French, who responded by establishing groupes mobiles, combined arms formations of regular and irregular infantry, cavalry and artillery. By 1914 the French had 80,000 troops in Morocco but two-thirds were withdrawn from 1914 to 1915 for service in France and more than 600 French soldiers were killed at the Battle of El Herri on 13 November 1914. Hubert Lyautey the French governor reorganised his forces and pursued a forward policy rather than passive defence. The French regained most of the lost territory, despite intelligence and financial support from the Central Powers to the Zaian Confederation and raids which caused losses to the French, when already short of manpower.

=== Egypt–Libya ===
==== Senussi Campaign ====
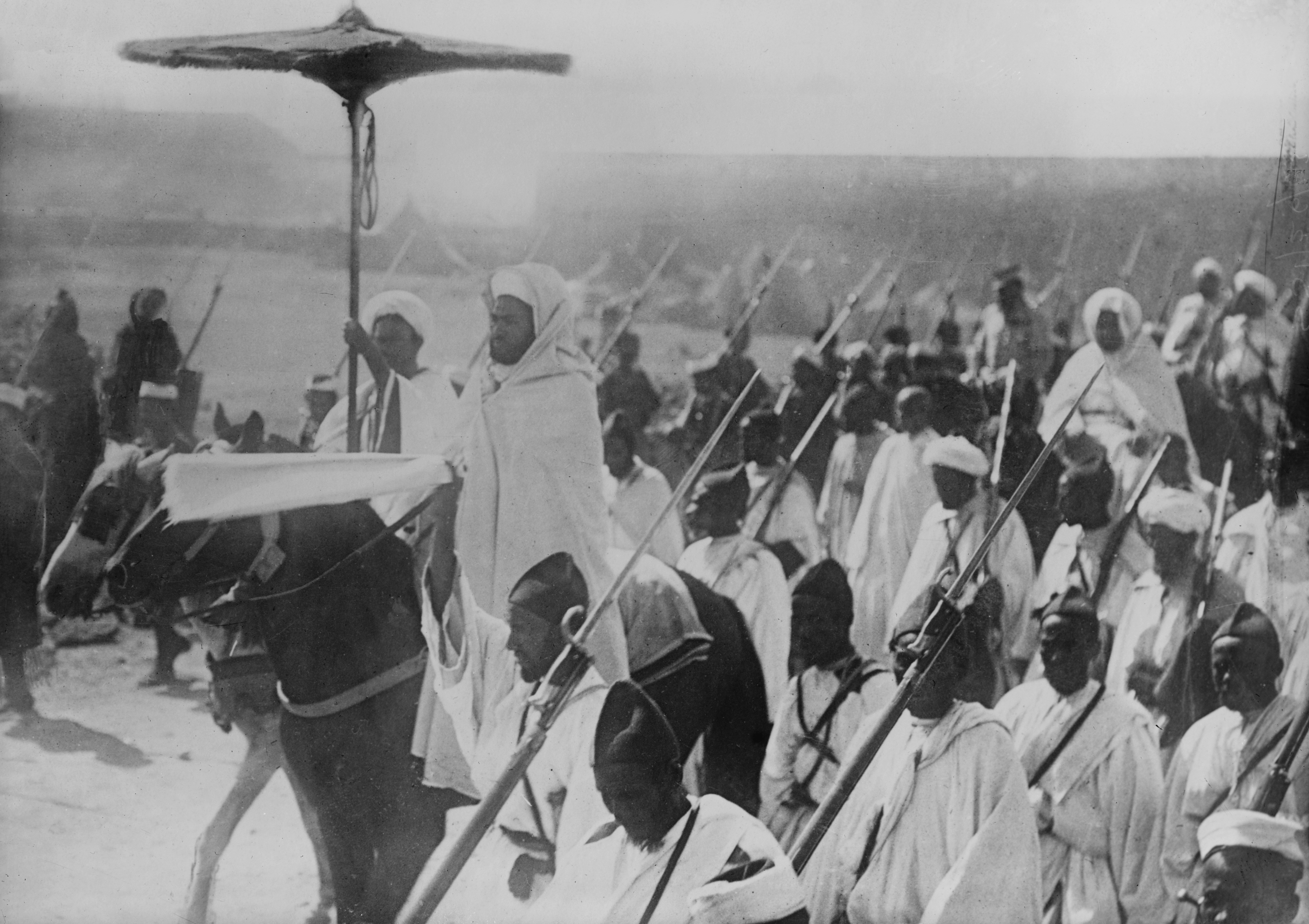
Senussi going to fight the British in Egypt

Britain declared war on the Ottoman Empire on 5 November 1914 and in the summer of 1915, Turkish envoys, including Nuri Bey, brother of Enver Pasha and Jaafar Pasha, a Baghdadi Arab serving in the Turkish army, negotiated an agreement with the Grand Senussi. The Senussi planned to attack the British in Egypt from the west, during the Ottoman offensive through Palestine against the Suez Canal. By late 1915, many of the British forces in Egypt had been sent to Gallipoli and Mesopotamia; western Egypt was garrisoned by the Egyptian coastguard. The Ottomans and Germans delivered modern weaponry by submarine to the Senussi. German and Turkish officers were also transported by submarine and landed on 19 May 1915 to the west of Sollum and set up headquarters at Siwa.

The Senussi raised 5,000 infantry and other irregular troops, equipped with Turkish artillery and machine-guns, for campaigns along the coast. An offensive led to attacks on Sollum, Mersa Matruh and Da'aba on the way to Alexandria and from Siwa through the band of oases of Bahariya, Farafra, Dakhla and Kharga 100 mi (160 km) west of the Nile. The Senussi crossed the Egyptian–Libyan border on 21 November 1915 to begin the coastal campaign. At the border, 300–400 men attacked a frontier post and were repulsed. In February 1916, Sayed Ahmed accompanied the Senussi against the band of oases. Several oases were captured and then lost in October 1916 to British forces; the Senussi retired from Egypt in February 1917. In November Senussi forces occupied Jaafar.

===== Coastal operations =====
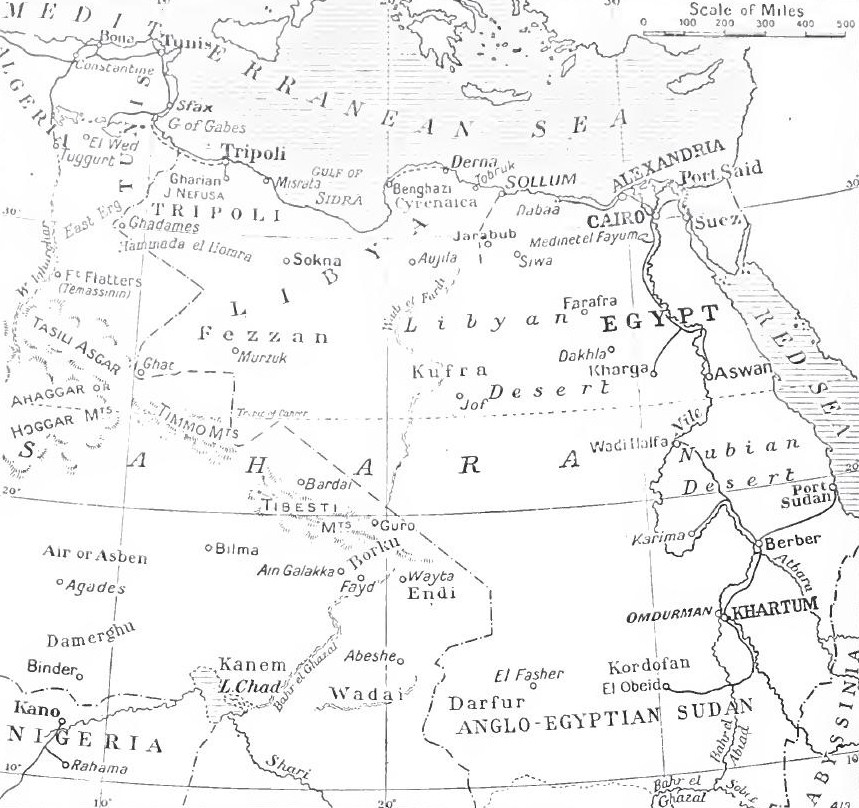
Western Desert, 1914–1918

On 6 November the German submarine U-35 torpedoed and sank a steamer HMS Tara in the Bay of Sollum. The U-boat surfaced, sank the coastguard gunboat Abbas and badly damaged Nur el Bahr with its deck gun. On 14 November the Senussi attacked an Egyptian position at Sollum and on the night of 17 November a party of Senussi fired into Sollum, as another party cut the coast telegraph line. Next night a monastery at Sidi Barrani, 48 mi (77 km) beyond Sollum was occupied by 300 Muhafizia and on the night of 19 November, a coastguard was killed. An Egyptian post was attacked 30 mi (48 km) east of Sollum on 20 November. The British withdrew from Sollum to Mersa Matruh, 120 mi (190 km) further east, which had better facilities for a base and the Western Frontier Force was created. (Note: The Western Frontier Force (Major-General A. Wallace) was composed of three Territorial infantry battalions (1/6th Royal Scots, 2/7th and 2/8th Middlesex Regiment), the 15th Sikhs, three new cavalry regiments formed from the rear details of Yeomanry and Australian Light Horse units who fought at Gallipoli as infantry, Royal Naval Air Service (RNAS) armoured cars, the 1/1st Nottinghamshire Royal Horse Artillery and two aircraft of 17 Squadron Royal Flying Corps (RFC).)

On 11 December, a British column sent to Duwwar Hussein, was attacked along the Matruh–Sollum track and in the Affair of Wadi Senba, drove the Senussi out of the wadi. The reconnaissance continued and on 13 December at Wadi Hasheifiat, the British were attacked again and held up until artillery came into action in the afternoon and forced the Senussi to retreat. The British returned to Matruh until 25 December and then made a night advance to surprise the Senussi. At the Affair of Wadi Majid, the Senussi were defeated but were able to withdraw to the west. Air reconnaissance found more Senussi encampments in the vicinity of Matruh at Halazin, which was attacked on 23 January, in the Affair of Halazin. The Senussi fell back skilfully and then attempted to envelop the British flanks. The British were pushed back on the flanks as the centre advanced and defeated the main body of Senussi, who were again able to withdraw.

In February 1916, the Western Frontier Force was reinforced and a British column was sent west along the coast to re-capture Sollum. Air reconnaissance discovered a Senussi encampment at Agagia, which was attacked in the action of Agagia on 26 February. The Senussi were defeated and then intercepted by the Dorset Yeomanry who charged across open ground swept by machine-gun and rifle fire as the Senussi withdrew. The British lost half their horses and 58 of 184 men but prevented the Senussi from slipping away. Jaafar Pasha the commander of the Senussi forces on the coast was captured and Sollum was re-occupied by British forces on 14 March 1916, which concluded the coastal campaign.

===== Band of Oases =====
On 11 February 1916 the Senussi and Sayyid Ahmed ash-Sharif occupied the oasis at Bahariya, which was then subject to bombing raids by Royal Flying Corps (RFC) aircraft. The oasis at Farafra was occupied at the same time and then the Senussi moved on to the oasis at Dakhla on 27 February. The British formed the Southern Force at Beni Suef and Egyptian officials at Kharga were withdrawn. The oasis was occupied by the Senussi, until they withdrew without being attacked. The British reoccupied the oasis on 15 April and began to extend the light railway, that terminated at Kharga to the Moghara Oasis. The mainly Australian Imperial Camel Corps, patrolling on camels and in light Ford cars, cut off the Senussi from the Nile Valley. Preparations to attack the oasis at Bahariya were detected by the Senussi garrison, that withdrew to Siwa in early October. The Southern Force attacked the Senussi in the Affairs in the Dakhla Oasis (17–22 October), after which the Senussi retreated to their base at Siwa.

In January 1917, a British column, including the Light Armoured Car Brigade with Rolls-Royce Armoured Cars and three Light Car Patrols, was dispatched to Siwa. On 3 February, the armoured cars surprised and engaged the Senussi at Girba, who retreated overnight. Siwa was entered on 4 February, unopposed but a British ambush party at the Munassib Pass was foiled, when the escarpment was found to be too steep for the armoured cars. The light cars managed to descend the escarpment and captured a convoy on 4 February. Next day the Senussi from Girba were intercepted but managed to establish a post which the cars were unable to reach and then warned off the rest of the Senussi. The British force returned to Matruh on 8 February and Sayyid Ahmed withdrew to Jaghbub. Negotiations between Sayed Idris and the Anglo-Italians which had begun in late January were galvanised by news of the Senussi defeat at Siwa. In the Accords of Akramah, Idris accepted the British terms on 12 April and those of Italy on 14 April.

=== Sudan ===
==== Darfur Expedition ====
On 1 March 1916 hostilities began between the Sudanese government and the Sultan of Darfur. The Anglo-Egyptian Darfur Expedition was conducted, to forestall an imagined invasion of Sudan and Egypt, by the Darfurian leader Sultan Ali Dinar, which was believed to have been synchronised with a Senussi advance into Egypt from the west. The Sirdar (commander) of the Egyptian Army, organised a force of c. 2,000 men at Rahad, a railhead 200 mi (320 km) east of the Darfur frontier. On 16 March, the force crossed the frontier in lorries from a forward base established at Nahud, 90 mi (140 km) from the border, with the support of four aircraft. By May, the force was close to the Darfur capital of El Fasher. At the Affair of Beringia on 22 May, the Fur Army was defeated and the Anglo-Egyptian force captured the capital the next day. Dinar and 2,000 followers had left and as they moved south, were bombed from the air.

French troops in Chad, who had returned from the Kamerun campaign, prevented a Darfurian withdrawal westwards. Dinar withdrew into the Marra Mountains 50 mi (80 km) south of El Fasher and sent envoys to discuss terms but the British believed he was prevaricating and ended the talks on 1 August. Internal dissension reduced the force with Dinar to c. 1,000 men; Anglo-Egyptian outposts were pushed out from El Fasher, to the west and south-west after the August rains. A skirmish took place at Dibbis on 13 October and Dinar opened negotiations but was again suspected of bad faith. Dinar fled south-west to Gyuba and a small force was sent in pursuit. At dawn on 6 November, a combined Anglo-Egyptian forced attacked in the Affair of Gyuba and Dinar's remaining followers scattered and the body of the Sultan was found 1 mi (1.6 km) from the camp. After the expedition, Darfur was incorporated into Sudan.

=== Italian Libya ===
In Libya, the Ottomans supported the Senussi and other local groups to expel the Italians and recover Tripoli. Italy declared war on the Ottoman Empire on 21 August 1915. Italy had reduced its garrisons in Libya for service in Europe and fought a defensive campaign. Ottoman–German operations were based at Misratah, where a submarine visited every couple of weeks with arms and ammunition. The Italians retained their coastal strongholds at Tripoli, Homs, Derna, Benghazi and Tobruk and, in 1916 re-occupied Zuwarah in Tripolitania and Bardia in Cyrenaica. In April 1917, the Accords of Acroma were signed between the British, Italians and the Senussi. The latter stopped conducting attacks and ended their alignment with the Ottomans. The armistice with the Ottoman empire and the Paris Peace conference confirmed Italian control of Libya and deprived the Sultan of his religious rights in the region (Article 121 of the treaty of Sèvres 1920).
