= Battle of Al-Rahiba =

Italian battle in Libya, year 1927

- Part of Second Italo-Senussi War
Date	28 March 1927
Location	near Jardas al-ʽAbid, Libya
Result	Senussi victory

Belligerents
Italy	Senussi

Commanders and leaders
(Kingdom of Italy) Major Passi	Omar al-Mukhtar

Strength
12 officers 744 men	350 men

Casualties and losses
(Fascist Italy) 6 officers killed 340 men killed	Unknown

The Battle of Al-Rahiba was a military engagement between the Senussi order led by Omar al-Mukhtar and the Italians. The Senussi won a resounding victory against the Italians.

== Battle ==
After the battles the Senussis had in Jabal al Akhdar led by Omar al-Mukhtar in January 1927, the Senussis then went to Jabal al Ubaid territories, as it provided a place for gatherings and reorganizing their forces in these fertile lands. To attack the Italians there, the Senussis had a force of only 350 men, according to Italian reports. The Italians feared that this force might encourage the tribes subjugated by the Italians, which would put them in a dangerous situation. This is when the Italians decided to strike.

An Italian force of 12 officers and 744 men led by Major Passi marched starting at 9:00 p.m. on March 27 towards Jardas al-ʽAbid , arriving at 6:00 a.m. the next day. They went for the thick forests, where they met resistance from the Senussis. As the march continued, more attacks increased until they arrived at Al-Rahiba Depression, where they fought with the Senussis. The Italians succeeded in capturing some high positions; however, the Senussis counter-attacked in front while also surrounding them.

The Italian leader saw that they could no longer achieve their goal and ordered a retreat. The Senussis chased them and exploited the disunity happening among the Italians, along with their knowledge of the territory, which allowed them to circle the Italians and separate them, which killed many of the Italians. Due to underestimating the Senussi numbers, the Italians lost 6 officers and 340 lives.

This defeat shook the center and prestige of the Italians and prompted Governor Attilio Teruzzi to initiate several military and political measures in an attempt to strike the resistance movement.

== See also ==
- Battle of Gasr Bu Hadi
- Battle of Safsaf
- Battle of Wadi Marsit
- Battle of Bir Tabraz
- Battle of Bir Bilal
- First Battle of Sidi Abu Arqub
