= Jardas Jerrari =

Jardas Jerrari جردس جراري
- Village
- Location in Libya
- Coordinates: 32°31′33″N 21°47′15″E
- Country: Libya
- Region: Cyrenaica
- District: Jabal al Akhdar
- Time zone: UTC+2

Jardas Jerrari (Arabic: جردس جراري) is a village in Jebel Akhdar, Libya. It was named Jardas Jerrari after the tribe living on it, and to identify it from Jardas al ‘Abid near Marj. Jardas Jerrari is located about 35 km south of the city of Bayda.

== See also ==
- List of cities in Libya
