= Faydiya =

Faydiya الفائدية
- Town
- Location in Libya
- Coordinates: 32°41′26″N 21°54′27″E
- Country: Libya
- Region: Cyrenaica
- District: Jebel el-Akhdar

Population (2006)
  - Total: 6,273
- Time zone: UTC +2

Faydiya, or Al Fa'idiyah is a town in the District of Jebel el-Akhdar in northeastern Libya.
