= Modus vivendi of Acroma =

1917 agreements between the Senussi, Britain, and Italy

The modus vivendi of Acroma was a pair of agreements signed by the Sanūsī Order with Britain and Italy on 16 April 1917 at Acroma (Akrama).

The negotiations that led to the modus vivendi were begun by Idrīs al-Sanūsī soon after he succeeded his uncle at the head of the order in 1917. His cousin, Aḥmad al-Sharīf al-Sanūsī, had instigated the Senussi campaign, an unsuccessful war against Britain with Ottoman and German assistance, at the height of the First World War. Idrīs wished to enter into negotiations with Britain but the British refused to negotiate unless their wartime ally, Italy, was included in the talks. Peace with Italy was more than al-Sharīf could bear and he left Libya for the Ottoman Empire when negotiations were opened.

The Italian and British delegations arrived in Tobruk in late January 1917, while Idrīs stayed in Acroma. Sanūsī and British messengers conveyed the parties' written proposals between the two sites. Italian delegates first visited to Acroma in late March, on which occasion Idrīs released an Italian prisoner-of-war as a sign of good will at the suggestion of the British.

There were four main documents that were the subject of negotiations: Italy's initial list of demands, Idrīs's initial list of demands, an Italian revision to Idrīs's list and Idrīs's comments and revisions to his original list. The Italians largely accepted Idrīs's demands. The sticking point in negotiations was the Italian request that he accept their demands in principle. The British backed Idrīs on this point and the issue was referred back to Tripoli (capital of Italian Libya) and Rome. When it was made explicit that acceptance in principle did not mean acceptance in detail and that further negotiations would be necessary before the implementation of any Italian demand, Idrīs agreed to sign the modus vivendi on 14 April. Two agreements with the powers were signed on 16 April.

The modus vivendi was a provisional set of agreements. It called for the Sanūsiyya to cease hostilities and for the Sanūsī army to disband. Italy and the Sanūsī agreed to release all prisoners-of-war. The Sanūsī were to be permitted free trade with the coast and with Egypt and Idrīs's rule recognised in the oases of Awjila, Jalu, Ajdabiya, Jaghbub and Kufra. The Sanūsī institutes (zawāyā) in Egypt, suppressed by the British, were to remain closed.

At Acroma, the Sanūsī repudiated Ottoman authority as requested by the Italians and the British. Thereafter, Idrīs arrested the Ottoman agents in his territory and placed pickets along the frontier between Cyrenaica and Tripolitania to prevent any from crossing into his territory. There was no official recognition yet of Italian sovereignty by the Sanūsī. Idrīs continued to deal directly with the British, despite Italian objections. In 1918, Italy and Britain even gave Idrīs arms to help him maintain his control over the Sanūsī. The modus vivendi was superseded by the accord of al-Rajima on 25 October 1920, by which Idrīs accepted Italian sovereignty.
