= Battle of Wadi Marsit =

Italian battle in Libya, year 1915

- Part of the Senussi campaign
Date	7 April 1915
Location	Mizda territory, Nafusa Mountains, Libya
Result	Senussi victory

Belligerents
Kingdom of Italy	Senussi Order

Commanders and leaders
(Kingdom of Italy) Col. Ganinzi (WIA) (Kingdom of Italy) Major Sartirana	Ahmed al-Sunni

Strength
1,400 men	400 men

Casualties and losses
Unknown, but more than the Senussi	Unknown

The Battle of Wadi Marsit was a military engagement fought between the Senussi Order and Italy. The battle proved to be a decisive Senussi victory, endangering Italian control over its Libyan Colony.

== Battle ==
Instructions were given to Colonel Ganinzi, the commander of the Gharyan military outpost, to move towards Mizda in order to chase the Senussis spreading in those areas and to put down the revolt of Libyans there. The colonel left Mizda on April 3 with a force of 1,400 men, half of whom were irregular forces, to attack the Senussi force of 400 men who were stationed in Wadi Taqja, between Quntrar and Oulad Abi Said, in order to face the Italians. On April 6, 1915, the Italians had reached Wadi Marsit and sent a vanguard for scouting to spot the Senussis.

The scouting party never found the enemy, and the Italians established their camps at 4:00 p.m. to spend the night there. During this time, the Senussi commander, Ahmad al-Sunni, marched from his positions and sent some scouting parties, and while the Italians were building their camps, they heard a gunshot three times. This caused panic in the Italian camp, and the irregular troops began running away from the camp. However, they were stopped by their officers, who pointed their guns against them in an attempt to force them to face the Senussi, which caused infighting in the camp that lasted until late at night, during which Ganinzi was wounded and the command was given to Major Sartirana.

The Major ordered a retreat to Mizda in the night; it wasn't long for the first hours of the new day that the remaining force were attacked by the Senussis, which caused further panic in the ranks. They abandoned their camels and baggage, and the irregular forces began separating from them.

== Aftermath ==
The battle of Wadi Marsit, alongside Battle of Gasr Bu Hadi, was a major victory for the Senussis and a major defeat for the Italians, which temporarily reversed their colonization of Libya and made them retreat towards their coastal colonies. The area would remain under Libyan control until 1924. The defeat was due to ignorance of the territory, and the infighting happened in the camp that weakened the army.

== See also ==
- Battle of Gasr Bu Hadi
- Battle of Safsaf
- Battle of Al-Rahiba
- Battle of Bir Tabraz
- Battle of Bir Bilal
