= Senussi campaign =

Military campaign of World War I

- Part of the North African theatre (First World War)
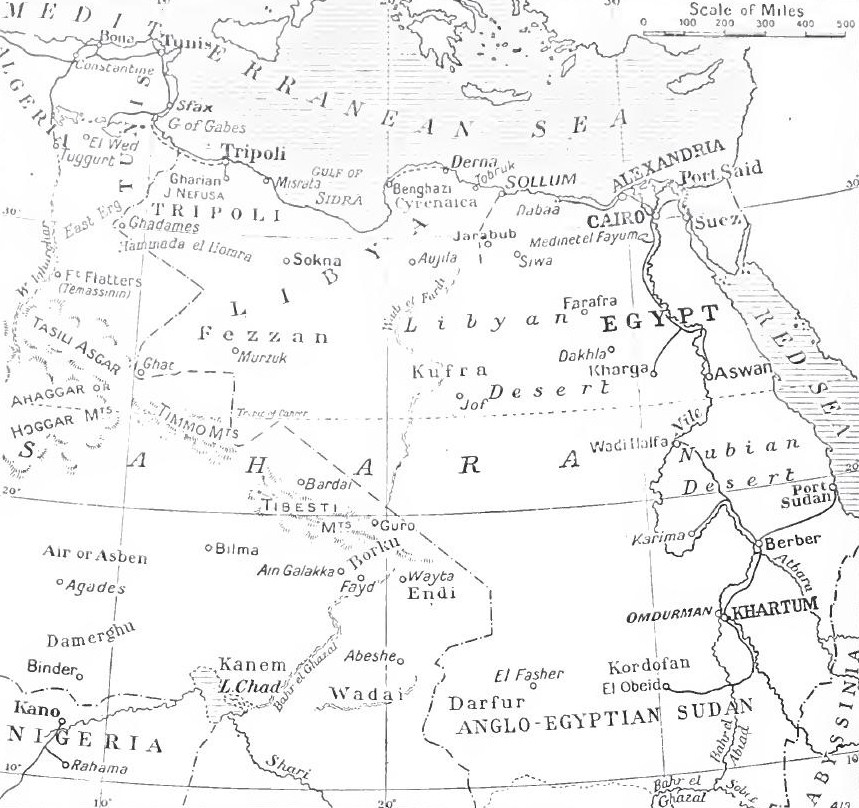
- Area of operations, Senussi campaign
Date	November 1915 – February 1917
Location	Western Desert of Egypt, eastern Libya 24°N 25°E
Result	British–Italian victory

Belligerents
Senussi; Ottoman Empire	Italy: Italian Tripolitania; Italian Cyrenaica; British Empire: United Kingdom; Australia; British India; New Zealand; South Africa; France: Regency of Tunis

Commanders and leaders
Sayyid Ahmed Sharif; Omar al-Mukhtar; (Ottoman Empire) Jaafar Pasha (POW); (Ottoman Empire) Nuri Bey	(United Kingdom of Great Britain and Ireland) William Peyton; (United Kingdom of Great Britain and Ireland) Alexander Wallace; (United Kingdom of Great Britain and Ireland) Henry Lukin; (United Kingdom of Great Britain and Ireland) Henry Hodgson; (Kingdom of Italy) Antonio Miani (WIA)

Strength
Senussi: 10,000 (1915)	Italy: 70,000; British Empire: 40,000

Casualties and losses
1,095 killed; 1,075 wounded; 109 captured	Italian: c. 11,000; 5,600 killed; British: c. 661; 117 killed and 544 wounded
- Non-battle casualties not counted

The Senussi campaign took place in North Africa from November 1915 to February 1917, during the First World War. The campaign was fought by the Senussi, a religious order of Arabic nomads in Libya and Egypt, against the Kingdom of Italy and the British Empire. The Senussi were courted by the Ottoman Empire and the German Empire. Recognising French and Italian threats, the Ottoman Sultan, Abdul Hamid II, had twice sent his aide-de-camp Azmzade Sadik El Mueyyed to meet Sheikh Muhammed El Mehdi El Senussi to cultivate positive relations and counter the west European scramble for Africa.

In the summer of 1915, the Ottomans persuaded the Grand Senussi, Ahmed Sharif as-Senussi, to declare jihad, attack the Italians in Libya and the British in Egypt and foment insurrection to divert British forces from the Sinai Peninsula in the east. The Senussi crossed the Libyan–Egyptian border in November 1915 and fought a campaign along the Egyptian coast. British Empire forces withdrew, then defeated the Senussi in several engagements, culminating in the action of Agagia, followed by the re-capture of the coast in March 1916. In the interior, the band of oases campaign continued until February 1917, after which a peace was negotiated and the area became a backwater for the rest of the war, patrolled by British aircraft and armoured cars.

== Background ==
=== Senussi ===
Before 1906, when the Senussi became involved in resistance against the French, they had been a "relatively peaceful religious sect of the Sahara Desert, opposed to fanaticism". In the Italo-Turkish War (29 September 1911 – 18 October 1912), Italian forces occupied enclaves along the Libyan coast and the Senussi resisted from the interior, maintaining generally friendly relations with the British in Egypt. In 1913, the Italians had been defeated at the action at Etangi but in 1914 Italian reinforcements led to a revival and by January the Senussi were in south-eastern Cyrenaica.

The Senussi had about 10,000 men armed with modern rifles, with ammunition from a factory which produced 1,000 rounds a day. Intermittent fighting continued between the Italians in fortified towns and the Senussi ranging through the desert. The British declared war on the Ottoman Empire on 5 November and the Ottomans encouraged the Senussi to attack Egypt from the west. Ottoman attacks against British forces from Sinai in the east had failed and the Ottomans wanted the Senussi to conduct operations against the rear of the defenders of the Suez Canal.

=== Ottoman Empire ===
In February 1915, Ottoman envoys, including Nuri Bey, the half-brother of Enver Pasha and Jaafar Pasha, a Baghdadi Arab in the Ottoman army, plotted to provoke trouble between the Grand Senussi, Sayyid Ahmed ash-Sharif and the British, by planning a raid on Sollum on 15 June but was thwarted. Nuri eventually gained command of Senussi military forces and began training the recruits of Aulad Ali. The Ottoman envoys negotiated an agreement with the Grand Senussi, in which his followers were to attack the British in Egypt from the west although his decision was not supported by all Senussi. The Ottomans provided machine-guns and artillery, using ships and German submarines to deliver weapons, equipment and money. (Note: After the war, Jaafar Pasha wrote that the Grand Senussi had always been lukewarm about war with Britain, considering that the danger of French and Italian colonial ambitions was serious enough but that German money, diplomatic intrigues and the influence of the Ottomans through Enver Pasha, "dragged him into the war".) By November 1915, the size of the British garrison in Egypt was much reduced by the expeditions to Gallipoli and Mesopotamia. The Western Frontier of Egypt was protected by the Egyptian Coast Guard (Lieutenant-Colonel C. L. Snow), whose commander was responsible for maintaining good relations with the local Bedouin and the Senussi.

=== Terrain ===
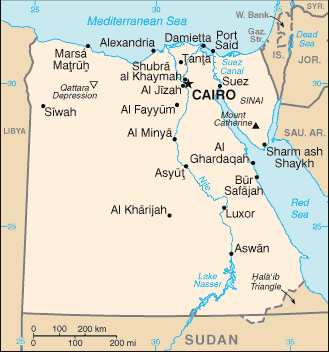
Map of Egypt

The western frontier of Egypt had not been defined in 1914 because negotiations with the Ottomans had been interrupted by the Italo-Turkish War (1911–1912) and then negated by the cession of Tripoli to Italy. A notional frontier ran south from Sollum, to the east of which was an area of 200,000 sq mi (520,000 km^{2}) all desert south of the semi-desert coastal strip but with several oases, some quite big and supporting sizeable populations, administered by the Egyptian government. Bedouin (Arab nomads) moved between the oases, traded with the inhabitants and took refuge at them when wells ran dry.

Along the Mediterranean coast of Egypt is a strip of land, well-enough watered to support grazing for camels and sheep; digging for water generally succeeds but wells and cisterns are often far apart and can unexpectedly run dry. The earth is dusty in summer and glutinous in the rainy season from December to March, when the days are relatively cool and the nights bitter cold. South of the coastal strip is a bare limestone plateau, about 50 mi (80 km) wide at Dabaa and 150 mi (240 km) broad at Sollum. To the south lies the desert, with sand dunes for several hundred miles.

Siwa Oasis, a Senussi stronghold, lies 160 mi (260 km) south of Sollum on the edge of the sand sea. To the east is a string of oases, some close enough to the Nile Valley to be in range of Senussi raiders travelling on camels. A standard-gauge railway ran along the coast from Alexandria, intended to terminate at Sollum, which in 1915 had reached Dabaa. A track, known as the Khedival Motor Road, fit for motor vehicles in dry weather, continued to the frontier although when hostilities began; the wet season was imminent.

== Prelude ==
=== Senussi–Ottoman preparations ===
German and Ottoman officers made their headquarters at Siwa Oasis with a Senussi force of 5,000 combatants, supported by mountain guns and machine-guns, to attack Sollum, Mersa Matruh and El Dabaa on the coast and the oases further south at Bahariya, Farafra, Dakhla and Kharga. On 15 August, a British submarine commander saw people onshore near Sollum and was fired on when he went to investigate, which caused a diplomatic incident until the Senussi pretended that the party mistook the submarine for an Italian boat. Sir John Maxwell, the commander of British troops in Egypt, pretended to believe the excuse, assuming that it had been a provocation to force the Grand Senussi's hand. Soon afterwards, the Senussi began training around Sollum with artillery and machine-guns, then Maxwell obtained documents from the Grand Senussi to Muslim leaders and journalists in Arabia and India, urging jihad.

The British continued to appease the Senussi, being in negotiations with the Sherif of Mecca and reluctant to inflame Muslim opinion. On 30 September, Snow met with the Grand Senussi and Jaafar Pasha, who discussed the undisciplined nature of desert nomads but Snow judged the Senussi forces to be potentially formidable. Soon afterwards, news arrived of another Senussi victory over the Italians near Tripoli and the capture of much weaponry and money. Senussi aggression against the British increased in November, when German submarines torpedoed an armed steamer HMS Tara and the transport ship Moorina, then handed over the crews to the Senussi at Port Suleiman in Cyrenaica. Sayed Ahmed affected ignorance when the British complained and negotiations began to persuade the Grand Senussi to dismiss the Ottoman envoys, in return for money; German submarine raids encouraged Senussi intransigence.

On 6 November, Egyptian coastguard boats in Sollum Bay were attacked by SM U-35, Abbas was sunk and Nuhr el Bahr was damaged. (Note: U-35 had picked up an Ottoman party from Budrum on 1 November, towed two ships with supplies and equipment and reached Bardia three days later, sinking a British ship en route. The crew of U-35 rescued seventy survivors of the hundred crewmen on Abbas, towed them to Bardia and handed them over to the Ottoman commandant. The submarine then returned to Sollum and attacked more ships.) On the night of 17 November, Senussi fired into the camp at Sollum, two Bedouin were murdered and the coast telegraph was cut. The next night, a zawiet (cell, monastery or hermitage) at Sidi Barrani 48 mi (77 km) east of Sollum, was occupied by 300 muhafazalar (commanders, defenders or guards) Senussi regular troops. Sayed Ahmed ordered his followers to cross the Egyptian frontier by 21 November, to conduct the coastal campaign. On the night of 19/20 November, the barracks at Sollum was fired on and a coastguard was killed. On 20 November, a post 30 mi (48 km) south-east of Sollum was attacked and when the news arrived civil unrest began at Alexandria.

=== British preparations ===
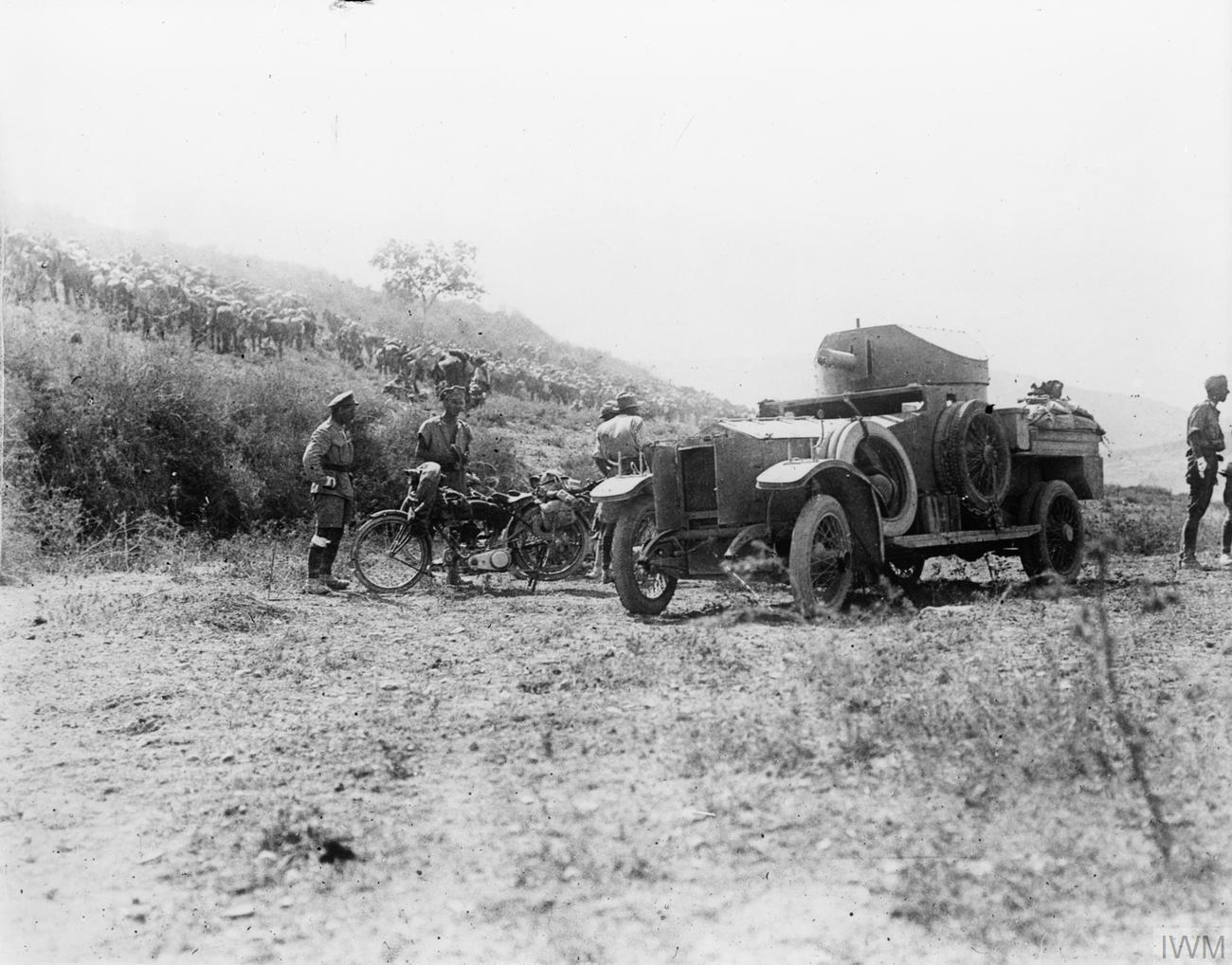
Rolls-Royce Armoured Car (photographed in 1918 in Palestine)

The British commanders adopted a policy of avoiding reverses, before attempting to defeat the Senussi. Sollum was 280 mi (450 km) from Alexandria, too far west for a base and too exposed to German submarines, with the lack of fast patrol boats to guard ships in the bay. Mersa Matruh (Matruh) was 120 mi (190 km) closer to Alexandria and had a good water supply. The Western Frontier posts were ordered back to Matruh to concentrate and to be reinforced by troops moved along the coast by trawler and on the Khedival Railway as far as Dabaa, 75 mi (121 km) short of Matruh. Orders were given on 20 November to form a Western Frontier Force (Major-General William Peyton) made up of composite horse and infantry brigades and supporting arms. By the end of the year, the British had about 40,000 troops in the Western Desert. (Note: The Composite Light Horse Regiment was formed from reinforcements waiting at Heliopolis Camp to go to Gallipoli. Instead they were issued with swords and sent to the Western Desert.)

On 21 November, the 2nd Battalion New Zealand Rifle Brigade, a company of the 15th Sikhs, parties of the Bikanir Camel Corps and an armoured train crewed by Egyptian gunners, was sent to Dabaa to guard the railway and patrol to the Moghara Oasis. Later on, the 1/1st North Midland Mounted Brigade was sent to Faiyum and a smaller force went to garrison Wadi Natrun, 45 mi (72 km) south of Alexandria. On the night of 23/24 November, about 300 men of the 15th Sikhs left Alexandria by trawler for Matruh and then to withdraw the garrison from Sollum but found that the 100-odd Egyptians from Sollum were already at Matruh, having sailed east on a coastguard ship Rasheed. (Note: By sailing at night, 4,500 troops were delivered without incident to Matruh by 7 December.)

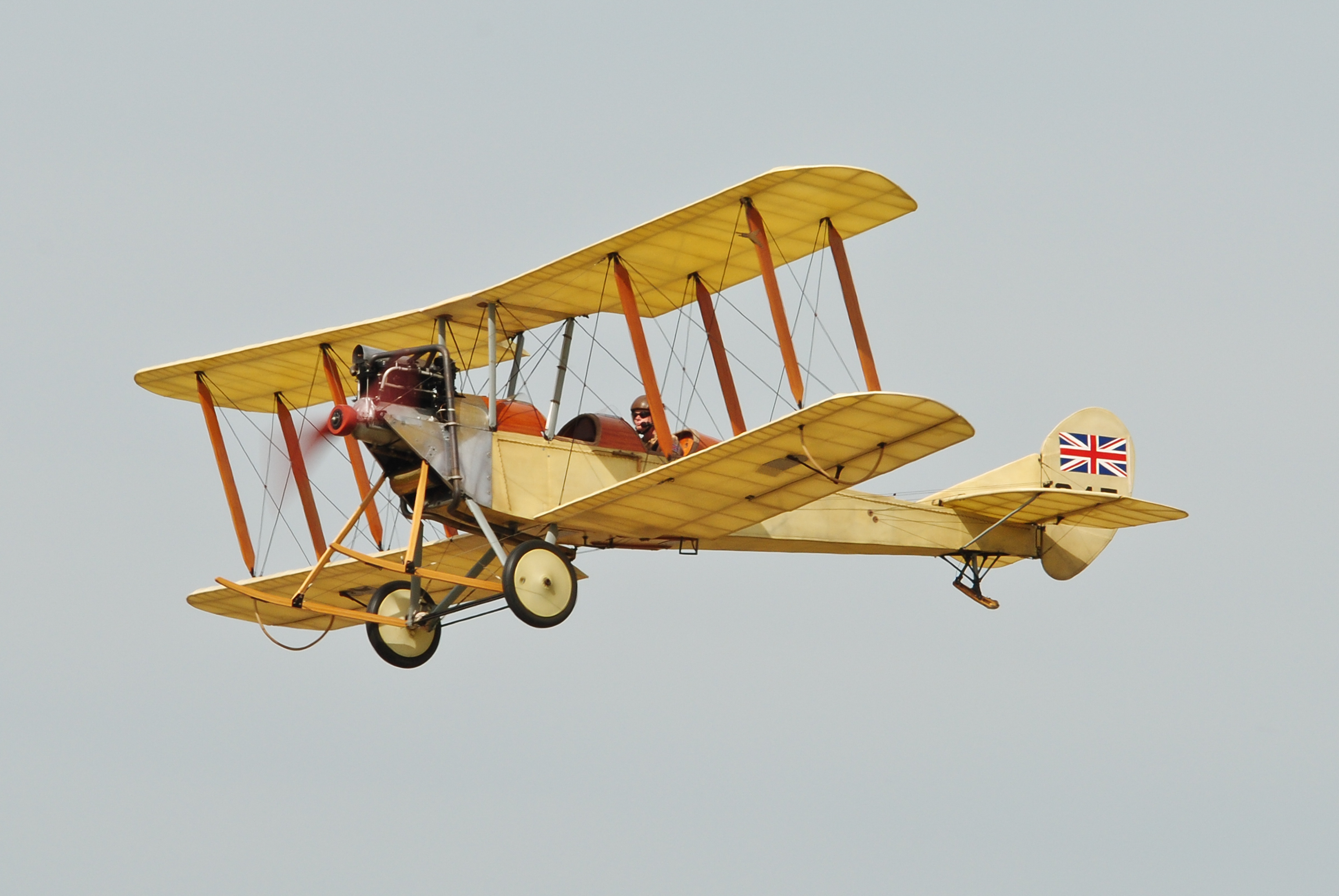
Replica B.E.2 in flight at Shoreham Airshow in 2013

The garrison at Sidi Barrani repulsed an attack late on 22 November and retreated before dawn, arriving at Matruh on 24 November. Buq Buq (Baqbaq) 100 mi (160 km) west of Matruh was also abandoned, although about 134 members of the Egyptian coastguard deserted to the Senussi with their equipment and 176 camels, after which a small force of Egyptian cavalry and infantry at Matruh were sent back to the delta in disgrace. As soon as Sollum was evacuated, ships arrived full of munitions for the Senussi. By 3 December, the Matruh garrison had increased to 1,400 men and by 10 November, the Western Frontier Force (WFF) had arrived with an artillery battery, two 4 in (100 mm) guns of the Royal Marine Artillery Heavy Battery from Alexandria and two Royal Flying Corps (RFC) B.E.2c aircraft from A Flight of 14 Squadron RFC, which began operations on 5 December. (Note: The staff had been thrown together, the second line Territorials had not finished training and the Composite Yeomanry had been drawn from twenty regiments. To guard the lines of communication, the 161st Brigade of the 54th (East Anglian) Division, just returned from Gallipoli, two armoured trains and two aircraft from 17 Squadron, were based at Hammam, 36 mi (58 km) along the Khedival Railway from Alexandria, to watch Moghara Oasis. Another 14 Squadron detachment was based at El Gharaq in Faiyum from 8 December, to watch Bahariya Oasis.)

== Senussi campaign ==
=== Coast ===
==== Affair of the Wadi Senab ====
On 11 December, Major-General Alexander Wallace sent a column (Lieutenant-Colonel J. L. R. Gordon) from Matruh to Duwwar Hussein 16 mi (26 km) to the west, with infantry, artillery and four armoured cars, three Ford light cars and a wireless car from the Royal Naval Armoured Car Division, the Composite Yeomanry Regiment and most of the Composite Infantry Brigade. The cavalry had moved about 9 mi (14 km) when they received small-arms fire from the right and tried to outflank their assailants, with support from the armoured cars but the column was recalled due to the volume of fire being received. The artillery joined in and an Australian Light Horse squadron arrived, after which the Senussi were driven back from the Wadi Senab. The force of about 300 Senussi lost 80 men killed and 7 captured against 16 killed and 17 wounded, one of whom was Snow, who was killed trying to capture a wounded Bedouin. Gordon heard the engagement and received a message dropped from an aeroplane but the distance, quantity of baggage and small size of his force led him to decide to rely on Wallace marching from Matruh and continued to Umm er Rakham, where the cavalry rallied for the night.

Gordon planned to advance to Wadi Hashefiat, after a reconnaissance aircraft dropped a note that Senussi were 7 mi (11 km) to the south-west and to move up the wadi to Duwwar Hussein. Wallace agreed to send four armoured cars to co-operate. Overnight, two companies of the Royal Scots arrived with a convoy of supplies and the march began at 8:30 a.m. behind a cavalry screen. Just east of Wadi Hashefiat, the force was fired on from the left at about 9:15 a.m. and the flank guard retired northwards, chased by what appeared to be British troops. They were identified as Senussi and observed advancing in open order and firing from behind cover and eventually seen to be a large force. Gordon ordered the main body to stop the Senussi advance while the advanced guard and cavalry enveloped the Senussi left flank. As both sides manoeuvred, the Senussi party appeared to be 1,000–1,500 men-strong and at 10:00 a.m. the infantry were supported by two field guns and three machine-guns.

Little was done the next day due to the exhaustion of the Yeomanry horses, except for a local patrol, which found some camels and took 25 prisoners. Gordon ordered the guard at Umm el Rakam to reinforce and later two squadrons of the Australian Light Horse arrived from Matruh with two field guns, which opened fire at 3:15 p.m. and a chance shell landed amidst the largest Senussi party, which scattered and ran. The rest of the Senussi began to retire and the British followed up but then returned to camp with casualties of 9 killed and 65 wounded, for an estimated 250 Senussi losses. (Note: Jafaar Pasha wrote after the war that the Senussi lost 17 killed and 30 wounded, not counting Bedouin irregulars.) The column returned to Matruh next day, much exhausted. The Senussi had managed to spring a surprise and make a determined attack that was repulsed but they escaped. The British concluded that had the rest of the column been as well-trained as the 15th Sikhs, the Senussi defeat would have been greater.

==== Affair of the Wadi Majid ====
The weather from 15 to 24 December, prevented operations from Matruh and the time was used for organisation; the WFF was reinforced by the 1st Battalion, New Zealand Rifle Brigade. The Senussi gathered on the Khedival Road at Gabel Medwa, 6 mi (9.7 km) west of Matruh, which air reconnaissance and spies estimated as a force of 5,000 men, a number of Muhafizia four guns and several machine-guns. A B.E.2c air observer of 14 Squadron sketched the Senussi encampment and copies were used by the ground commanders. Jaafar later wrote that three battalions of muhafazalar had 300 men each, four mountain guns and two machine-guns, which had been sent to Dabaa to cut communications with Alexandria. Another three battalions four guns and eight machine-guns were at Halazin, 15 mi (24 km) south-west of Gebel Medwa. Both forces were accompanied by Bedouin irregulars, who could be relied on to join in if the Senussi defeated the British. Wallace decided to try a night advance to surprise the Senussi, and at 5:00 a.m. on 25 December, two columns advanced from Matruh.

The right column was to advance direct to Gebel Medwa, and the left column was to move via Wadi Toweiwia south of Matruh and then west round the Senussi flank to cut off their retreat. An Azalea-class sloop, HMS Clematis was to provide gunfire support to any target in range. The cavalry left Wadi Toweiwia by 7:30 a.m. but moving the guns and ammunition took another two hours as the rest of the column moved towards the Khedival Road 12 mi (19 km) west of Matruh. The right column moved forward silently but at 6:00 a.m., Senussi outposts raised the alarm and engaged the column which stopped until the light improved. Many Senussi could be seen in the hills to the south and south-east but not on Gebel Medwa because of the sudden appearance of the British. The Gebel Medwa was occupied to guard the right flank and then the advance was to continue down the road, when a Senussi field gun fired on the road with some accuracy. The Notts battery replied and silenced the gun; shells from Clematis 10,000 yd (5.7 mi; 9.1 km) away, fell on the Senussi position.

The 15th Sikhs advanced astride the road at 8:45 a.m., as other troops followed on or attacked on the left flank. By 9:30 a.m., the Sikhs had closed to within 800 yd (730 m) of the main Senussi position and saw that they were retiring. The Sikhs pressed on with the 1st New Zealand Rifles and took the ridge by 10:00 a.m. Some Senussi were trapped in caves and gullies and killed, as artillery bombarded the rest of the Senussi during their retreat. The cavalry in the left column had been delayed by Senussi cavalry and were not able to cut off the Senussi retreat, having been engaged since 8:00 a.m. 4 mi (6.4 km) south of Gebel Medwa, with the Senussi horsemen apparently placed there to foil an outflanking move. Eventually, machine-gun fire forced back the covering party, but the column did not resume the advance until 9:00 a.m. and then tried to cut off small parties. Attempts to signal the left column to advance direct to Wadi Majid took until near 1:00 p.m. to arrive and the cavalry took until 3:00 p.m. to reach the wadi, by when the Senussi had escaped. The infantry had killed about 100 Senussi, captured 80 camels and then burned the encampment.

The British faced north against the Senussi rearguard backed against the sea but most of the Senussi had retreated westwards with their livestock and as dark fell, the rearguard was able to slip away from Wadi Senab and Wadi Majid along the rocky shore, where the cavalry could not follow. At 5:00 p.m. Gordon ended the pursuit and ordered the infantry to bivouac at Gebel Medwa and the cavalry to return to Matruh. The defeat lowered Senussi prestige but the inability of the British cavalry to exploit the victory, left the Senussi main body intact. British casualties were 13 killed and 51 wounded and about 300 Senussi were killed and 20 captured. Jaafar Pasha's baggage was taken and some of the dead were seen to be the Egyptian coastguards who had deserted. Several Indian prisoners taken from the Moorina, escaped from the Senussi in the confusion and returned to their units; Wallace was able to begin operations between Matruh and Dabaa after a brief rest.

==== Affair of Halazin ====
Following the Affair of the Wadi Majid, after a brief rest, Wallace sent a column to Bir Gerawla, 12 mi (19 km) south-east of Matruh late on 28 December, after the camp was spotted by air reconnaissance. The column returned on 30 December having met no resistance, with Bedouin fleeing as the column approached. Eighty tents were destroyed along with some grain; 100 camels and 500 sheep were looted, which forced the local Bedouin into acquiescence. On 1 January 1916, eighty tents were seen by a reconnaissance aircrew at Gebel Howeimil, 35 mi (56 km) south-east of Matruh, but torrential rains prevented an attack on the camp for ten days. The rain stopped on 9 January but it took a day for the ground to recover and a mixed column reached Baqqush late on 13 January. On the next day, the camp was found to be deserted but smaller camps were found with camels and livestock; the tents were burned and the livestock looted before the column returned to Baqqush. During the raid, the telegraph from Matruh to Dabaa was repaired and on 15 January, troops who were being transferred from the WFF returned via Dabaa as the rest of the column returned to Matruh on 16 January with 13 prisoners and booty of 140 camels and 50 cattle.

On 19 January, air reconnaissance found the main Senussi camp at Halazin, 22 mi (35 km) south-west of Matruh, with 300 tents, including that of the Grand Senussi and it was decided to attack as soon as possible. The WFF advanced on 22 January to Bir Shola 12 mi (19 km) to the south-west and moved on Halazin in two columns, next morning. The infantry column on the right followed a compass bearing towards the camp and the cavalry moved forward in echelon on the left flank. It rained and the baggage train was left behind, motor ambulances bogged down and the armoured cars were sent back to Matruh. After a 7 mi (11 km) advance, the Senussi were seen and an hour later the infantry attacked as the cavalry were sent against the right flank of the Senussi. At 10:00 a.m. the infantry advanced towards a defensive position about 1.5 mi (2.4 km) long, which was obscured by a mirage. The Senussi were thought to be retiring on a prepared position with considerable skill and handling three guns and five machine-guns well. A party of Senussi appeared on the British right and then another party appeared on the left, as the British right flank guard was driven back under machine-gun fire. New Zealand reinforcements were sent to the flank with machine-guns and stopped the Senussi attack but were then outflanked and reinforced again.

The Senussi outflanking move on the left was more threatening, it stopped the left column at 1:30 p.m. and gradually drove it back, until two New Zealand companies stopped the Senussi advance. The Sikh advance in the centre had continued as the flanks were pushed back but the Sikh, South African and New Zealand infantry pressed on and at 2:45 p.m. reached the Senussi entrenchments, at which the defenders gave way and retreated into the desert.
The cavalry were not able to pursue when the Senussi on the flanks retreated, for lack of water for the horses, the condition of the ground made an armoured car advance impossible. British casualties were 31 killed and 291 wounded. Senussi prisoners estimated that 200 had been killed and 500 wounded but the bulk of the Senussi force remained intact and air reconnaissance on 24 January, found them at Bir Tuta towards Sidi Barrani. The British set up a bivouac close by and the troops spent the night without shelter or food. The column returned to Bir Shola, through even worse mud and wounded men who could not sit on horses were carried by stretcher. The night of 24 January was also wet but conditions were much better, with food water and tents for the wounded.

==== Action of Agagia ====
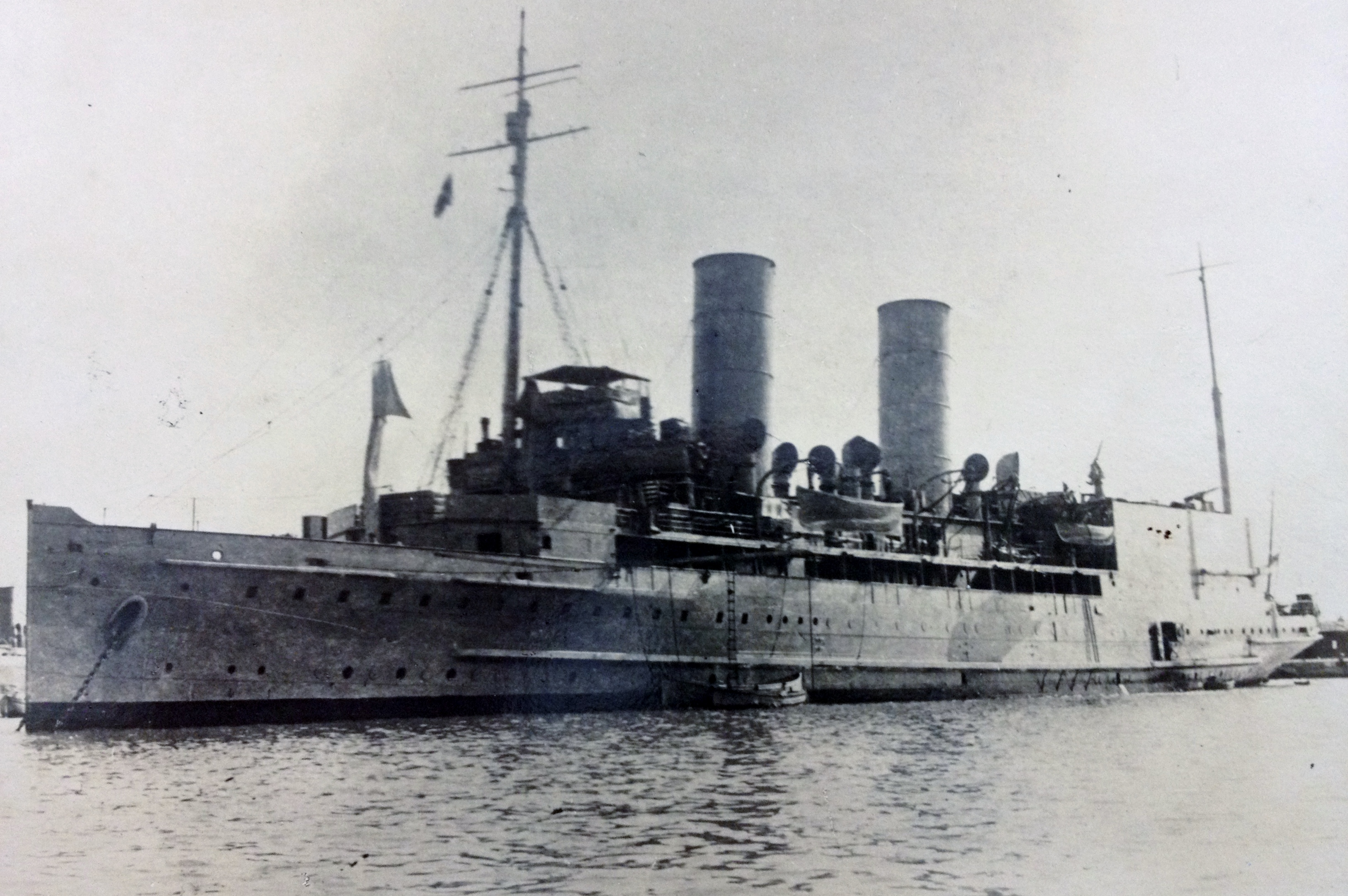
HMS Ben-my-Chree, seaplane carrier

In February 1916, a seaplane carrier, HMS Ben-my-Chree was sent from Port Said; on 11 February, its aircraft observed Sidi Barrani and Sollum and on 15 February discovered the Senussi were encamped at Agagia. The WFF was reinforced by the 1st South African Brigade (Brigadier-General Henry Lukin) and a British column under Lukin advanced west along the coast to re-capture Sollum in February. En route, a Senussi encampment at Agagia was spotted by aircraft. On 26 February, the column attacked the Senussi and captured Jaafar Pasha, commander of the Senussi forces on the coast. As the Senussi retreated, they were cut off by a Dorset Yeomanry cavalry charge; the Yeomen lost half their horses and about a third of the riders (58 of the 184 who took part) but dispersed the column, caused about 500 casualties, took 39 prisoners, captured the Senussi baggage train and pursued the survivors into the desert.

==== Reoccupation of Sollum ====
After burying the dead and resting the survivors, Lukin advanced to Sidi Barrani and entered unopposed on 28 February. On 2 March, two reconnaissance aircraft was sent from Matruh and on 8 March the aircraft flew to Sidi Barrani to search from Sidi Barrani to Sollum. The WFF had gained a base 90 mi (140 km) further west than Matruh but could only land supplies in good weather and had to rely on the overland route until the Navy caught up. As soon as the British were established at Sidi Barrani, Lukin returned as many horses and gunners as possible to reduce the demand for food, which by camel convoy took four days and needed 50–100 escorts per journey. Delivery of supplies by sea was complicated by the fear of German submarines but had been completed by 4 March, which made it feasible to return the bulk of the WFF to Sidi Barrani by 7 March. Many units had been posted away and new ones sent forward, including the Cavalry Corps Motor Machine-Gun Battery, with 17 light armoured cars and 21 motorbikes. The Khedival Road to Sollum followed the coast and the inland escarpment which was 25 mi (40 km) from the coast at Sidi Barrani converged with the coast at Sollum.

To avoid an ascent of the escarpment by the Halfaya Pass with the Senussi waiting at the top, Peyton chose an inland route via the Median Pass 20 mi (32 km) south-east of Sollum, using wells at Augerin and cisterns at Median and Siwiat on the plateau for water. Reconnaissance flights by the RFC found small camps near the escarpments but no signs of defensive works at the passes. The slower moving infantry were to set off on 9 March, to arrive at dawn on 12 March and capture the Median and Eragib passes. The horsed column of the 2nd Mounted Brigade, artillery and the camel corps, were to leave on 11 March and rendezvous with Lukin on 13 March at Augerin. The infantry column reached Buq Buq on 11 March, the cavalry reached Alem abu Sheiba and on the next day, the infantry column reached Augerin; armoured cars occupied the Median and Eragib passes. The water supply was found to be insufficient for the cavalry column or all of the infantry. Peyton ordered Lukin to advance with two battalions and artillery and send the rest back to Buq Buq with the cavalry column, to join with Peyton and make a slow advance along the coast. Lukin advanced with the 1st South African Regiment, the 4th South African Regiment, the Hong Kong Mountain Battery and a Field Ambulance detachment. On 12 March the reduced force ascended the plateau via the passes to Bir el Siwiat.

During 13 March, the forces with Peyton advanced to Bir Tegdida, 19 mi (31 km) from Sollum but the cavalry remained at Buq Buq, after an erroneous report of insufficient water at Tegdida. On 14 March, the three columns concentrated near Halfaya Pass, 3 mi (4.8 km) short of Sollum, the cavalry having caught up and the battalions with Lukin carrying water on camels. Peyton sent the 2nd South African Infantry Battalion up the pass to join Lukin and continued along the coast. The approach march turned into an anti-climax as the Senussi had departed from Sollum before the columns arrived and supply ships arrived the next day. The Duke of Westminster's armoured cars pressed on to Bir Waer, which air reconnaissance reported to have been abandoned, to pursue the Senussi westwards. The armoured cars managed to drive at up to 40 mph (64 km/h) on the hard desert surface and by-passed hundreds of Senussi. Having driven 25 mi (40 km) west of Sollum, the main Senussi force was sighted and attacked.

The Senussi could not stand their ground and fled into the desert, apart from a small Ottoman contingent. The Ottomans were overrun and killed; thirty prisoners were taken, with three field guns, nine machine-guns and 250,000 rounds of ammunition, for no British casualties. The cars pursued for 10 mi (16 km), shooting down the Senussi as they ran. In Sollum, a letter from Captain R. S. Gwatkin-Williams, the commander of the Tara was found, giving the whereabouts of the survivors of the vessels sunk the previous November. Senussi prisoners admitted that the crews were being held at Bir Hakeim, about 120 mi (190 km) west of Sollum. The Duke of Westminster set off with 45 light cars and ambulances on 17 March and drove from 1:00 a.m. to 3:00 p.m. over unfamiliar ground, strewn with boulders, to conduct the Bir Hakeim rescue. The 91 men were fed then driven back to an Australian Camel Corps outpost at Bir Waer, returning to Alexandria the next day. The former prisoners had reported that there had been no mistreatment but that they had suffered from the famine caused by the military operations in the region and that four of the prisoners had died, mainly from hunger.

==== Minor operations ====
The Senussi defeats in the coastal campaign forced the survivors over the border into Libya. To prevent a Senussi revival, the light Fords and armoured cars continued their patrols. The Aulad Ali, having also gone hungry in the famine, surrendered to Peyton and public unrest in Alexandria diminished. The South African Brigade returned to Alexandria and two battalions of the Composite Brigade, a company of the Camel Corps, two guns of the Hong Kong Battery, the light armoured cars and the reconnaissance aircraft remained in Sollum, with an RFC half-flight. On 7 April, four light armoured cars and a machine-gun section of the 2/7th Middlesex left Sollum to raid an ammunition dump at Moraisa, 18 mi (29 km) to the north-west and destroyed artillery ammunition and about 120,000 rounds of small-arms ammunition; other patrols during the month uncovered another 167,000 rounds. The Italian Army posted two battalions at Bardia to co-operate and from 25 to 26 July, a raiding force from Sollum and Italian cars from Bardia, a party from the Camel Corps and an Italian yacht, Misurat, attacked a party of about forty muhafazalar at Wadi Sanal in Libya, 40 mi (64 km) west of Ras el Mehl. The party was scattered and served as a warning that there was no sanctuary on either side of the border. Patrols continued for the year and a camel convoy was captured near Jaghbub, a Senussi stronghold 135 mi (217 km) from Sollum; Italian–British raids took place during the winter.

=== Band of oases ===
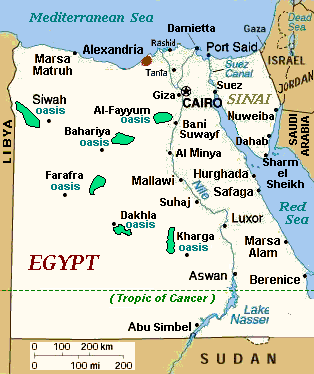
Map showing Egyptian oases

Over 300 mi (480 km) west of the Nile lies Siwa Oasis, from which there are two routes to the Nile Valley through lines of oases. The northern route lies to the east past several small oases and wells to the big oasis at Bahariya, which at its eastern fringe is about 100 mi (160 km) from the Nile at Minya. The southern route goes south-east through Farafra and Dakhla to the large oasis of Kharga, 100 mi (160 km) from Suhag on the Nile. On 11 February 1916, 500 Senussi and Sayyid Ahmed ash-Sharif occupied the oasis at Bahariya, just before Peyton was ready to begin a march from Matruh to Sollum. The Senussi were seen by air observers from a 17 Squadron detachment at Faiyum. On 12 February, the aircraft bombed the oasis with eight 20 lb (9.1 kg) bombs and a reconnaissance flight three days later found no Senussi. (Note: The Senussi had dispersed among the civilian population of about 6,000 people and the British assumed that the Senussi had fled. Farafra was reconnoitred on 1 March and thought to be unoccupied. The air detachment at Minya was moved to Asyut.) The oasis at Farafra was occupied at the same time and then the Senussi moved on to the oasis at Dakhla, where they were seen on 27 February, after the RFC detachment at Minya had moved to Asyut and then established advanced landing grounds to watch the Kharga and Dalka oases, reaching out to a radius of 225 mi (362 km).

The 159th Brigade had already been sent to Wadi Natrun, north-west of Cairo and the 1/1st North Midland Mounted Brigade to Faiyum, about 60 mi (97 km) to the south-west of Cairo, with smaller forces along the Nile. The British reinforced the detachments covering the Nile Valley and named the command Southern Force (Major-General J. Adye) based at Beni Suef, conveniently placed to resist an advance from the west. The defeats inflicted on the Senussi during the coastal campaign made it possible to extend the garrisons southwards and at the end of March, the south end of the line of posts was at Isna. Egyptian officials at Kharga, where there was a light railway connecting with the main line along the Nile, were withdrawn when Dakhla was occupied. No attempt was made to attack the Senussi but frequent reconnaissance sorties by aircraft kept watch. By 19 March, Senussi defeats on the coast had lowered their morale. The Senussi retired from Kharga of their own accord and the British used the light railway to transport the Kharga Detachment (Lieutenant-Colonel A. J. McNeill), an all-arms force of 1,600 men to the oasis on 15 April. (Note: The Kharga Detachment consisted of the understrength 1/1st Fife and Forfar, 1/1st and 1/2nd Lovat Scouts dismounted Yeomanry, an RFC half-flight, the Hong Kong Mountain Battery, parties of the Egyptian Cavalry, Imperial Camel Corps, Royal Engineers and auxiliaries.)

On 20 March, an outpost was set up at Moghara Oasis, about 95 mi (153 km) west of Cairo. Murray ordered an extension of the light railway from Kharga to the Moghara Oasis, a new light railway from the Nile at Beni Mazar to Bahariya and the building of a line of blockhouses along the Darb el Rubi track from Samalut to Bahariya, the route of the new railway. The Imperial Camel Corps had been formed in November 1915 mainly from companies of the 1st Australian Division and 2nd Australian Division, the Australian Light Horse, New Zealand troops, British Yeomanry and Territorial infantry. The corps became the principal force in the defence of western Egypt, combining camel transport and motor vehicles. Patrols of light Ford cars and light armoured motor batteries revolutionised the occupation of the Western Desert, increasing the range of patrols from tens of miles by camel to hundreds of miles by vehicle. Because of the distances involved, patrols operated independently but proved so effective that the Senussi were quickly cut off from the Nile Valley and isolated in the oases that they still occupied.

==== Affairs in the Dakhla Oasis ====
Map of Dakhla Oasis

By late May 1916, four blockhouses had been built along the Darb el Rubi track, and slow progress had been made building the railway to Bahariya. The main Senussi force, estimated at 1,800 men, was at Dakhla, and on 4 October, Murray ordered the new Western Force commander, Major-General W. A. Watson, to commence operations against it. News leaked to Sayed Ahmed, who had advanced from Dakhla to Bahariya with most of his force, which was weakened by illness and hunger, and Ahmed retreated to Siwa from 8 to 10 October. The Western Force tried to trap the Senussi rearguard west of Bahariya with a force of light cars, but the distance and bad going enabled the Senussi to get away. The British realised that the garrison at Dakhla was much smaller and likely to retire soon, and Watson decided to attack from Kharga.

The force contained sixty men with a Rolls-Royce Armoured Car and a tender, six Fords and twelve motorbikes, two Vickers guns and two Lewis guns, to be followed by a company of the Camel Corps, which could not arrive for 48 hours after the cars. The motors arrived at Dakhla on 17 October to find that most of the Senussi had gone apart from a party of about 120 men at Budkhulu in the middle of the oasis, which was taken prisoner. The company of the Camel Corps arrived at Bir Sheikh Mohammed, at the west end of Dakhla, on 19 March and took another forty prisoners. The British began to patrol all round and took another fifty prisoners and some politically suspect civilians. By the end of March, the oasis and its 20,000 occupants had been cleared of the Senussi. Garrisons were installed at Dakhla and Bahariya and civilian government resumed. In November, an expedition to Farafra took more prisoners.

==== Raid on Siwa ====
In January 1917, Murray learned that Sayed Ahmed intended to retire from Siwa to Jaghbub with his 1,200 retainers. On 21 January, Murray ordered an operation to capture him and inflict losses on his remaining followers. It was expected to take a month to prepare an expedition of cars and camels, to travel the 200 mi (320 km) of waterless desert from Matruh but news arrived that Ahmed was ready to leave. Murray ordered Brigadier-General Henry Hodgson to attack immediately by using only the cars. The Girba and Siwa Oases are almost contiguous, with Girba lying north-west of Siwa. The main Senussi force was based at Girba and Hodgson planned to attack with a detachment of armoured motor batteries blocking Munassib Pass near Gagaib, 24 mi (39 km) to the north-west. The Girba–Jaghbub track descends from the plateau through the pass. The British anticipated that the Senussi would retreat along the pass and be trapped.

The three light armoured batteries and three light car patrols struggled through the desert to a point 185 mi (298 km) south-west of Matruh and 13 mi (21 km) north of the Shegga Pass on 2 February. At 9:00 a.m. the next day, the force entered the oasis 5 mi (8.0 km) south-east of the Neqb el Shegga and advanced on Girba. The cars surprised the Senussi, who exchanged fire, but the British found that the ground was too rough to get closer than 800 yd (730 m) until later in the day, when some cars managed to work forward another 400 yd (370 m) and maintain machine-gun fire on the Senussi defences. Deserters said that there were about 850 Senussi at Girba and another 400 at Siwa with Mohammed Saleh, who had moved to Girba to command the defence as Sayed Ahmed prepared to retreat to the west. The night was quiet until 5:00 a.m., when the Senussi opened fire and began to burn their stores. As dawn broke, the Senussi were seen retiring through a pass to the rear and disappeared. The raiders destroyed the camp, sent patrols towards Siwa and entered the next day unopposed, where the inhabitants appeared happy to be rid of the Senussi.

The main party at Munassib Pass failed to intercept the Senussi because the escarpment was too steep to get closer than 18 mi (29 km), and only the light cars and an armoured car managed to descend the escarpment and close the pass. On 4 February, the party ambushed a convoy from the west that was carrying mail and on the next day met the advanced parties of Senussi, which were retreating from Girba. The raiders were foiled when the Senussi held them off and diverted convoys following on behind through sand dunes around the pass. The cars returned to the rendezvous, and the raiders estimated that they had killed forty Senussi, forty camels and inflicted 200 wounded. Rifles and equipment had been destroyed and three British members of the party had been wounded. The force returned to Matruh on 8 February, as Sayyid Ahmed withdrew to Jaghbub. Negotiations between Sayed Idris and the British and the Italians at Tobruk, which had begun in late January, were galvanised by news of the Senussi defeat at Siwa. At Akramah on 12 April, Idris acted on British insinuations that they regarded him as the legitimate Senussi leader and that Sayed Ahmed was a nuisance. Idris accepted British terms and settled with Italy on 14 April.

=== Italian Libya ===
==== Background ====
Hostilities between the Italians and the Senussi began with the Italo-Turkish War (1911−1912) in which the Italians acquired Libya from the Ottoman Empire, with their forces in control of some outposts on the Libyan coast between Zuwarah and Tobruk. The interior remained unoccupied, allowing the Senussi and other groups to continue operations to expel the Italians from Libya. There was resentment toward the Italians for the atrocities they committed to pacify Tripoli and other territories; the hinterland and the coastal strip had been depopulated from Al-Khums to Benghazi, Derna and Tobruk.

Italy began expanding in the interior but in 1914−1915, preparing to enter the First World War, cut its occupation force and was forced to evacuate several positions. An uprising forced the Italians out of Ghat (that they had occupied in August 1914) and Ghadames. The forward Italian post in the Sirtica, the fortress of Bu Njem (captured from its Ottoman garrison in 1914), was abandoned after Colonel Antonio Miani, force-marching from the Sirtica, was defeated on 29 April 1915 by the Senussi at Gasr Bu Hadi (Qasr bu Hadi or Al Ghardabiya), with 3,000–4,000 casualties. The material captured was calculated at 6.1 million rifle and machine-gun rounds, 37 artillery pieces, twenty machine-guns, 9,048 rifles, 28,281 artillery shells and 37 trucks. The Senussi captured more Italian arms than those delivered by the Ottomans and Germans.

The interior was either evacuated (Waddan, Hun and Suknan) or its posts left to isolated garrisons besieged by the Senussi and Bedouin. In July 1915, Italy evacuated Zuwarah and its hinterland. The Senussi objective of expelling the Italians coincided with Ottoman war aims. The call to jihad in November 1915 had more effect among the Senussi than elsewhere and Ahmad began the jihad in Fezzan in southern Libya. The Ottoman sultan appointed Sayed Ahmed the governor of Tripolitania and Ahmed published the Caliph's decree of jihad against the infidel British and their allies, including the Italians (who had entered the war in May 1915).

==== War declaration ====
After the open resumption of aid deliveries to the Senussi from the Ottoman Empire in July 1915, Italy responded with a declaration of war on 21 August. Hostilities allowed Italy formally to rescind all the privileges the Ottoman sultan enjoyed in Libya under the Treaty of Ouchy (17 October 1912), that had ended the first Italo-Turkish War. The British blockaded the Cyrenaica coast to prevent supplies being landed by Greek boats at first and then German submarines from late 1915, guarding the Cyrenaica–Egyptian border to prevent arms smuggling, which was being done openly by the Ottomans with German connivance.

In 1914, the British had chosen to appease the Senussi but the accession of Italy to the Entente in May 1915 led to the British applying pressure to the Senussi to recognise the Italian occupation and stopping cross-border trade. The Senussi became more dependent on German and Ottoman imports and had to move to find food. The attempt by Mannesmann, a German agent, to fabricate a diplomatic incident on 15 August failed but the economic crisis caused by the British embargo pushed the Senussi towards war.

Ottoman–German operations in Tripolitania were based at Misratah, where a submarine visited every couple of weeks to deliver arms and ammunition; in May 1917 a wireless station was built. Ottoman troops established about twenty posts on the coast and by 1918 had 20,000 regular troops, a similar number in training and another 40,000 untrained reservists.

==== Operations ====
In 1916, a Senussi contingent, commanded by Ramadan al-Shtaiwi, invaded Tripolitania. The Senussi routed a Bedouin group led by Sayed Safi al-Din at Bani Walid before Sayed Idris recalled the force and accepted the notion of a western limit of Senussi power. Idris established a khatt al-nar (line of fire) across the Sirtica, to prevent raiding by al-Shtaiwi and his forces, who were armed by the Italians and whose goal was to re-establish themselves inland. The Italians re-captured Ghadames in February 1916 but the blockade on the Senussi had little military effect, since they were well stocked with captured Italian weapons.

In Cyrenaica, in March 1916, Sayed Hilal, a young relative of Sayed Ahmed, presented himself to the Italians at Tobruk, ostensibly seeking food for the starving peoples of the Marmarica. The Italians induced him to convince the Aibadat people to surrender 1,000 rifles in exchange for food. His good offices were used to enter the port of al-Burdi Sulaiman unopposed in May and then Sayed Ahmed's old camp at Masa'ad. His activities disgraced Sayed Idris and negotiations between an Anglo−Italian commission and Idris at al-Zuwaitina broke down. (Note: Rumour had it that he lived a life of drunkenness and debauchery among the Italian officers.)

In May 1916, the Italians re-occupied Zuwarah (in Tripolitania) and Bardia (in Cyrenaica). The British were conducting offensive operations against the Senussi. By early 1917, British–Italian–Senussi talks resumed at Akrama (Acroma), where the Senussi agreed to end their attacks on the British and Italians with the Accords of Acroma in April. The questions of disarming the populace and of the status of Islamic law were left for the future but the fighting in Cyrenaica came to an end.

In September 1918, having been prevented from entering Tripolitania by Ottoman forces, Sayed Ahmed boarded a German submarine at al-Aqaila and went into exile in Turkey. In Tripolitania, local troops commanded by al-Shtaiwi and Ottoman regular soldiers led Nuri Bey and Suliman al-Baruni, resisted the Italians until the end of the war. Archaeological analysis of the salt pan of Kallaya, the site of a minor skirmish between Libyans on 14 November 1918, shows that they had Russian rifles captured by the Germans and Austro-Hungarians on the Eastern Front and sent to Libya via the Ottomans.

=== Invasion of Tunisia ===
On 13 September 1915, a Senussi commander, Khalifa Ben Asker, invaded the French Protectorate of Tunisia and took Dehiba, south of Tataouine. The French, distracted by the rebellion in southern Algeria, had left the south of Tunisia undefended. The Senussi found little support from the local population and the Senussi leaders were angry at Khalifa ben Asker for drawing the French into battle. Their war was against the Italians and the British and wished to avoid provoking the French. Khalifa ben Asker was arrested by the Senussi and their forces withdrew from Tunisia.

== Aftermath ==
=== Analysis ===
The affairs and actions in the Western Desert were small engagements and when the Senussi began hostilities, the British garrison of Egypt had been depleted by the Sinai and Palestine campaign and the Gallipoli campaign. Small numbers of troops on both sides ranged over great distances and the troops involved in the Gallipoli expedition returned before the conclusion of the Senussi Campaign, increasing the garrison in Egypt to 275,000 men on 2 March 1916. The total of British and Commonwealth forces was about 40,000 men but only 2,400 took part in the action of Agagia. The campaign was fought using traditional methods of warfare together with modern technology, a process begun by the Italians, who had pioneered the military use of aeroplanes in the Italo-Turkish War.

In 1915 the British exploited the internal combustion engine to drive on the desert and fly over it, adding a new dimension of speed and mobility to their operations that was beyond the capacity of the Senussi to challenge. The British integrated naval operations with the air and ground campaign as well as using older methods of warfare, with camels as beasts of burden to increase the range of ground troops and by conducting espionage and sowing dissent among the Senussi leaders and their Ottoman and German sponsors. Light car patrols and light armoured motor batteries made long-distance patrols and raids, collecting information and surprising the Senussi, who soon lost contact with the Nile Valley and were then isolated in oases until overrun or forced out by starvation and disease.

In 2001, the military historian, Hew Strachan, described the hostilities in Libya as a war independent of the First World War, beginning in 1911 and ending in 1931. A colonial land-grab was resisted by the local population that developed into a national liberation movement. The technological advantages of the British and the huge, sparsely inhabited space of the desert were conditions favouring mobility and decisive action, the opposite of the effects of industrial warfare in Europe. The British adopted equipment and methods that rapidly defeated the Senussi in 1915 and 1916. The British methods succeeded in Sinai, Palestine and Syria from 1917 to 1918.

=== Casualties ===
In 2010, Andrea Del Boca wrote that in Libya, Italian casualties were 5,600 killed, several thousand wounded and about 2,000 prisoners from January to July 1915.

=== Peace ===
By March 1917, Senussi forces had been ordered to withdraw from Egypt into Libya. The attack by the Senussi on Egypt had not helped the Ottoman Empire to defeat the British east of the Suez Canal and most of the Egyptian population did not join the jihad and rise against the British. Sayed Ahmed was undermined by the defeat and his nephew, Sayyid Mohammed Idris, who had opposed the campaign, gained favour at his expense. The peace deal, the modus vivendi of Acroma, between the British and the Senussi was agreed on 12 April 1917 and recognised Idris as emir of Cyrenaica (he eventually became King Idris I of Libya). Idris was required to hand over all British, Egyptian or Allied citizens who had been shipwrecked and to surrender or expel Ottoman officers and their allies.

A fifty-strong police force was allowed at Jaghbub but no other military force was allowed there, at Siwa or in Egypt. The British undertook to allow trade through Sollum and that, although Jaghbub would remain Egyptian, it would be under the administration of Idris as long as the undertaking not to allow military forces to enter Egypt was honoured. Two days later, Idris came to terms with the Italians, signed a modus vivendi and the Western Frontier remained calm for the rest of the war. Sayed Ahmed lingered for a year, in August 1918, he travelled to Constantinople in an Austro-Hungarian submarine and conducted pan-Islamic propaganda.

== Orders of battle ==
=== WFF, Affair of the Wadi Majid ===
All units from Macmunn and Falls: Military Operations Egypt and Palestine volume I (1996 [1928]) unless specified.

Right Column Lieutenant-Colonel J. L. R. Gordon

- Royal Bucks Hussars
- 1 Section, Notts Battery RHA
- 15th Sikhs
- 1st New Zealand Rifle Brigade
- 2/8th Middlesex

Notts and Derby Field Ambulance Water Section, Australian Train

Left Column Brigadier-General J. D. T. Tyndale-Briscoe Brigade Staff and Signal Troop, Composite Yeomanry Brigade

- 2 Troops Duke of Lancaster's Own Yeomanry
- 1 Troops Derbyshire Yeomanry
- 2 Troops City of London Yeomanry
- 1 Squadron Herts Yeomanry
- Composite Regiment Australian Light Horse
- Notts Battery RHA (less one Section)
- Yeomanry Machine-Gun Section
- Yeomanry Field Ambulance

=== Senussi, WFF ===
All units from Macmunn and Falls, Military Operations Egypt and Palestine, volume I (1996 [1928]) unless specified. Later information suggested that there were 10,000 Senussi.

January 1914

- Derna district
  - 3,000 paid regulars
  - 6,000 volunteers (unpaid)
- Benghazi district
  - 3,000 paid regulars
  - 5,000 volunteers
- Tripoli district
  - 600 African soldiers
  - 800 Zowai Arabs
  - 1,000 Tuareg

20 November 1915 (Note: Units from Macmunn and Falls: Military Operations Egypt and Palestine volume I (1928) unless specified.)

- Composite Yeomanry Brigade (Brigadier-General Tyndale Biscoe)
  - 3 Composite yeomanry regiments from the 2nd Mounted Division, comprising details from more than twenty regiments
  - 1 Composite regiment of Australian Light Horse, made up of details from Australian light horse brigades
  - 1/1st Nottinghamshire Royal Horse Artillery
  - Ammunition Column
- Composite Infantry Brigade (Brigadier-General Lord Lucan)
  - 1/6th Battalion Royal Scots (Territorial)
  - 2/7th Battalion Middlesex Regiment (Territorial)
  - 2/8th Battalion Middlesex Regiment (Territorial)
  - 15th Ludhiana Sikhs
- 1 Squadron Royal Flying Corps
- Divisional Train from the 1st Australian Division
- Detachment from the Egyptian Army Military Works Department took the place of the Royal Engineers, none of the latter being available.

The composition of the force was frequently changed, and it was not until mid-February 1916 that it settled. Other units attached to the WFF included:

- 1st South African Infantry Brigade
- 2nd Battalion New Zealand Rifle Brigade
- Bikaner Camel Corps
- Imperial Camel Corps
- The Duke of Westminster's armoured car unit
- Armoured train manned by the Egyptian Artillery
- 1/1st North Midland Mounted Brigade plus attached artillery
- 6th Mounted Brigade (Note: The 6th and 22nd were new titles of the 1/2nd South Midland and 1/1st North Midland brigades.)
- 22nd Mounted Brigade
- 2nd Dismounted (Yeomanry) Brigade
- 3rd Dismounted (Yeomanry) Brigade
- 4th Dismounted (Yeomanry) Brigade
  - Reconnaissance aircraft
  - Auxiliary troops
