= Chan Chan Airport =

Airport in Los Ríos, Chile

- IATA: none; ICAO: SCHN

Summary
- Airport type: Public
- Serves: Choshuenco, Chile
- Elevation AMSL: 457 ft / 139 m
- Coordinates: 39°51′55″S 72°7′50″W

Map
- Location of Chan Chan Airport in Chile

Runways
Direction	Length		Surface
Direction	m	ft	Surface
02/20	1,200	3,937	Grass
- Source: Landings.com Google Maps

Chan Chan Airport Spanish: Aeropuerto Chan Chan, (ICAO: SCHN) is an airstrip serving Choshuenco, a small lakeshore town in Los Ríos Region of Chile.

The airstrip is at the foot of the Mocho-Choshuenco volcano, in the narrow valley of the Enco River. The volcano begins rising immediately to the east of the runway. There is mountainous terrain in all quadrants.

== See also ==
- Transport in Chile
- List of airports in Chile
