= Battle of Bir Tabraz =

Italian battle in Libya, year 1911

- Part of Italo-Turkish War
Date	19 December 1911
Location	near Tripoli, Libya
Result	Senussi victory

Belligerents
Kingdom of Italy	Senussi

Commanders and leaders
(Kingdom of Italy) Gustavo Fara	Unknown

Strength
1,500 men or 2,780 men	200–300 men

Casualties and losses
150 killed 250 wounded or 11 killed 91 wounded	11 killed 40 wounded

The Battle of Bir Tabraz was fought in December 1911 during the Italo-Turkish War between the Kingdom of Italy and Senussi forces in a place near Tripoli in modern Libya, the Senussi successfully forced to Italians to withdraw.

== Battle ==
Bir Tabraz was one of the most important positions the Senussi had near Tripoli after the Battle of Ain Zara happened on December 4. Bir Tabraz's position was garrisoned by 200-300, according to Italian reports; this alarmed the Italians alongside other Senussi gathering positions, which harassed the Italian forces resisting them. An expedition was launched led by General Fara with a force of 2,780 or 1,500 men at 2-2:30 a.m. on December 19 and didn't reach that position until 9:00 a.m. after a long floundering on the way.

It wasn't until they marched to meet the Senussi that they were attacked by them, and according to Italian reports, the Senussis focused on the right and left wings of the army. Though the Senussi forces weren't equivalent to the Italians, they went from a defensive to an aggressive stance and almost cut off the escape route of the Italians and communication lines to Ain Zara, which forced the Italians to avoid a battle with unwanted results.

The Italians attempted to march to some heights, but the Senussi prevented them and forced them to engage and attack from all sides. This situation made it impossible for the enemy to retreat back to Ain Zara due to the success of the Senussi. Panic struck the camp, fearing they would lose their supplies and their retreat route. The Italians, however, managed to retreat during the night. However, they kept facing the Senussi, which forced them to ask for reinforcements to cover their retreat which did not arrive.

The Italians retreated at 7:25 a.m. the next day, the battle had lasted for the entire day. The Italians lost around 150 killed and 250 wounded or 11 killed and 91 wounded, while the Senussi lost 11 deaths and 40 wounded.

== See also ==
- Battle of Gasr Bu Hadi
- Battle of Safsaf
- Battle of Al-Rahiba
- Battle of Wadi Marsit
- Battle of Bir Bilal
- First Battle of Sidi Abu Arqub
