= List of reduplicated New Zealand place names =

This is a list of places in New Zealand with reduplicated names, often as a result of the grammatical rules of the Māori language from which many of the names derive.

In Māori, both partial and full reduplication occurs. The change in sense is sometimes to reduce the intensity of the meaning, e.g. wera, hot, werawera, warm.

Note that not all places which appear to have reduplicated names in New Zealand have. For example, the name of the Auckland suburb of Te Papapa comes either from a vegetable, papapa, or from the words for fort and flat (slabs), pā and papa respectively.

The information in the list below is sourced from the Heinemann New Zealand Atlas, Copyright Department of Lands and Survey Information (maps) and Octopus Publishing Group (NZ) Ltd (text), first published in 1987, reprinted 1990, ISBN 0-7900-0187-X

== Place names ==
- Hari Hari
- Horohoro
- Karekare
- Karikari Peninsula
- Katikati
- Kawakawa
- Kerikeri
- Kihikihi
- Kohukohu
- Korokoro
- Kuku
- Matamata
- Meremere
- Mimi
- Mitimiti
- Mt Kaukau
- Naenae
- Napenape
- Okuku
- Ongaonga
- Pakipaki
- Parapara
- Peka Peka
- Piopio
- Piripiri
- Ramarama
- Tukituki River

== See also ==
- List of reduplicated place names
- List of reduplicated Australian place names
