= Battle of Gasr Bu Hadi =

1915 battle during the Italian colonization of Libya

Date	29 April 1915
Location	Gasr Bu Hadi, south of Sirte, Italian Libya
Result	Senussi victory

Belligerents
Kingdom of Italy	Senussi Order

Commanders and leaders
(Kingdom of Italy) Antonio Miani (WIA) (Kingdom of Italy) Capt.Sirvadai (WIA)	Ahmed Tuati; Sfi Aldin Al-Senussi; Salih Lataiwish; Hamad Saif Al-Naser (Cyrenaica) Ramadan Sewehli

Strength
14,000 men 6,159 men: 84 officers; 900 italian soldiers; 2,175 askari; 3,000 libyan soldiers (deserted)	Over 9,000 (more than 6,000 rebels at Gasr bu Hadi at the command of Ahmed Tuati plus the 3,000 irregulars that turned their coats against the Italians)

Casualties and losses
13,500 Killed Commander Miani (mostly Eritreans of the 15th Battalion)	Unknown

The Battle of Gasr Bu Hadi occurred during the Italian colonization of Libya. It is seen by some as the worst Italian defeat since the Battle of Adwa, although this is debated by some.

== The battle ==
On afternoon of 28 April 1915, Colonel Miani marched out of Camp Sirte to attack the Senussi camp at Gasr Bu Hadi, south of Sirte under the lead of Sfi aldin Al sanusi His column of 84 officer, 900 Italian soldiers (one Battalion of the 2nd Regiment Bersaglieri, two companies of the 57th Infantry, two artillery battery) 2,175 askaris (3rd, 4th and 13th Libyan Askaris Battalions, 15th Eritrean Askaris Battalion), was supported and covered by nearly 3,000 Libyans Irregulars under the command of Ramadan Sewehli and other tribal chiefs. Ramadan Sewehli, after fighting the Italians in 1911–12, cooperated with them for a while, but was later jailed for Senussi leanings. Miani thought that he could be trusted.

At 07:00 of 29 April 1915, the Italian column, that had spent the night at Bu Scenaf's well, moved. At 09:30 the Misrata and Tarhuna bands signalled that had spotted the enemy forces. At 10:30 the battle began. From the battle start the Irregular Bands, apart from the Zliten's band commanded by Mohammed Feuzy Bey, refused to comply with the orders and simply stopped trying to guess the battle outcome. When they understand that the Italians was deeply involved in the battle attacked the supply column, practically undefended at the moment, and stole it. The Libyans captured 5,000 reserve rifles, millions of rounds of ammunition, several machine guns, six sections of artillery with abundant ammunition, and all the supplies including the fund of the column.

== Aftermath ==
The Libyans pushed home their victory and advanced to Misrata. The Italian withdrawal became a rout, garrisons abandoned their posts without defending towards the coast. The Libyans were soon at Ben Gashir, 15 miles from Tripoli. A general withdrawal to the coast was ordered on 5 July. The Tarhuna garrison was massacred during its break out to the sea. A thousand men at Beni Uled surrendered. The Garian garrison retired to Azizia and was then forced to withdraw hastily towards Tripoli. Four-and-a-half thousand men abandoned Misrata for Misrata Marina, and Zuwara was evacuated from the sea. By 1 August the only Tripolitanian towns still held by the Italians were Homs, Misrata Marina, Tagiura and Tripoli itself, where there were 40,000 troops to man the machine gun nests and the new wall circling the outer suburbs. Italy had suffered the worst defeat since Adowa and the Tripolitanian campaign was almost back to its starting point. Since the previous August the Italians had lost an estimated 3,000 men killed, 2,400 prisoners, thirty pieces of artillery, 15,000 rifles and huge quantities of ammunition and equipment.

== See also ==
- Battle of Bir Bilal
- Battle of Al-Rahiba
- Battle of Wadi Marsit
- Battle of Bir Tabraz
- First Battle of Sidi Abu Arqub
