= Nimnim Lake =

- Location within Vancouver Island
- Location: Vancouver Island, British Columbia
- Coordinates: 49°29′50″N 125°09′15″W
- Lake type: Natural lake
- Primary outflows: Nimnim Creek
- Basin countries: Canada

Nimnim Lake is a lake located south of south end Comox Lake.

== See also ==
- List of lakes of British Columbia
