= Kalifa Tillisi =

Khalifa Mohammed Tillisi
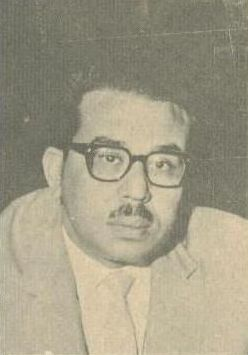
- Born: 9 May 1930; Tripoli, Italian Tripolitania
- Died: 13 January 2010 (aged 79); Tripoli, Libya
- Citizenship: Libya
- Occupations: Writer, linguist, historian and politician
- Writing career
- Language: Arabic and Italian
- Genres: History, lexicography, translation, poetry

Khalifa Mohammed Tillisi (Arabic: خليفة محمد التليسي;9 May 1930 – 13 January 2010) was a well-known Libyan historian, translator, statesman, and linguist.

== Life ==
Tillisi was born in Tripoli, Italian Tripolitania (present-day Libya), on 9 May 1930, where he first became a teacher then entered politics. In 1952 he worked in the Libyan Parliament where he became its Secretary General in 1962. He reached the peak of his political career when he became a minister for information in the cabinets of Mahmud al-Muntasir and Hussein Maziq from 1964 to 1967, Libya's Ambassador to Morocco in 1967–1969.

After the political change in Libya in 1969, he had been trialed by the Libyan People's Court, and sentenced to four years in prison. The sentence was suspended and was forced into early retirement at the age of 39. In 1974 he founded a Libyan-Tunisian publishing company (Arabic book house). He was the first president of the Libyan Literature and Writers association in 1977 and was appointed the Secretary General of the Arabic Writers Association in 1978 and in 1981 he became the Secretary General of the Arabic Publishers Association.

He is remembered in Libya for his contributions to literature and his public life.

== Books ==
A Total of 49 titles. The following are some of his work:

- Author (in Arabic):
1. "Echebbi wa Gibran", 1957.
2. "Rafik sha'er al watan", 1965.
3. " Mu'jam Ma'arik al Jihad fi Libia", A Dictionary for Italian Colonial Battles on the Libyan Soil 1911–31, 1972.
4. " Ma Ba'd Al Qurdabiya", History of Italian Colonial Battles in Tripolitania, and Fezzan 1922–1930, 1973.
5. " Hakatha Ghanna Tagore", 1991.
6. "Qamoos Itali-Arabi", Italian-Arabic Dictionary, 1984.
7. "An Nafees", Arabic Dictionary.
- Translator (from Italian to Arabic) :
1. "Qisas Italiya", Luigi Pirandello, 1967.
2. "Popolazione della Tripolitania, Enrico De Agostini, 1975
3. "Popolazione della Cirenaica, Enrico De Agostini, 1990.
4. "Cirenaica Verde", Attilio Teruzzi, 1991.
5. " Memoria della mia vita", Giovanni Giolitti, 1976.
6. " L'esplorazione Geografica Della Libia: Rassegna Storica Bibliografia", Attilio Mori, 1984.
