= Jardas al-ʽAbid =

Jardas al-ʽAbid جردس العبيد
- Town
- Location in Libya
- Coordinates: 32°18′17″N 20°58′59″E
- Country: Libya
- Region: Cyrenaica
- District: Marj
- Elevation: 1,080 ft (330 m)

Population (1995)
  - Total: 6,051
- Time zone: UTC+2 (EET)
- Area code: 06762

Jardas al-ʽAbīd or Jerdes el Abid (Arabic: جردس العبيد) is a small town in the Marj District, located in northeastern Libya about 29 km southeast of Marj.

It was named Jardas Al 'Abid after the tribe living on it, and to identify it from Jardas Jerrari near Slonta.

Probably ignorant of the fact above, Jardas Al 'Abid (Literally meaning: Jardas of the Slaves) was renamed Jardas Al Ahrar (Literally meaning: Jardas of the Free) after Muammar Gaddafi took power in 1969.
