= Safsaf, Libya =

Safsaf سفصف
- Town
- Location in Libya
- Coordinates: 32°46′49″N 21°57′0″E
- Country: Libya
- Region: Cyrenaica
- District: Jabal al Akhdar
- Time zone: UTC + 2

Safsaf (Arabic: سفصف Safṣaf) is a town in the District of Jabal al Akhdar in north-eastern Libya. It is located about 16 km east of Bayda.
