= Egypt–Libya relations =

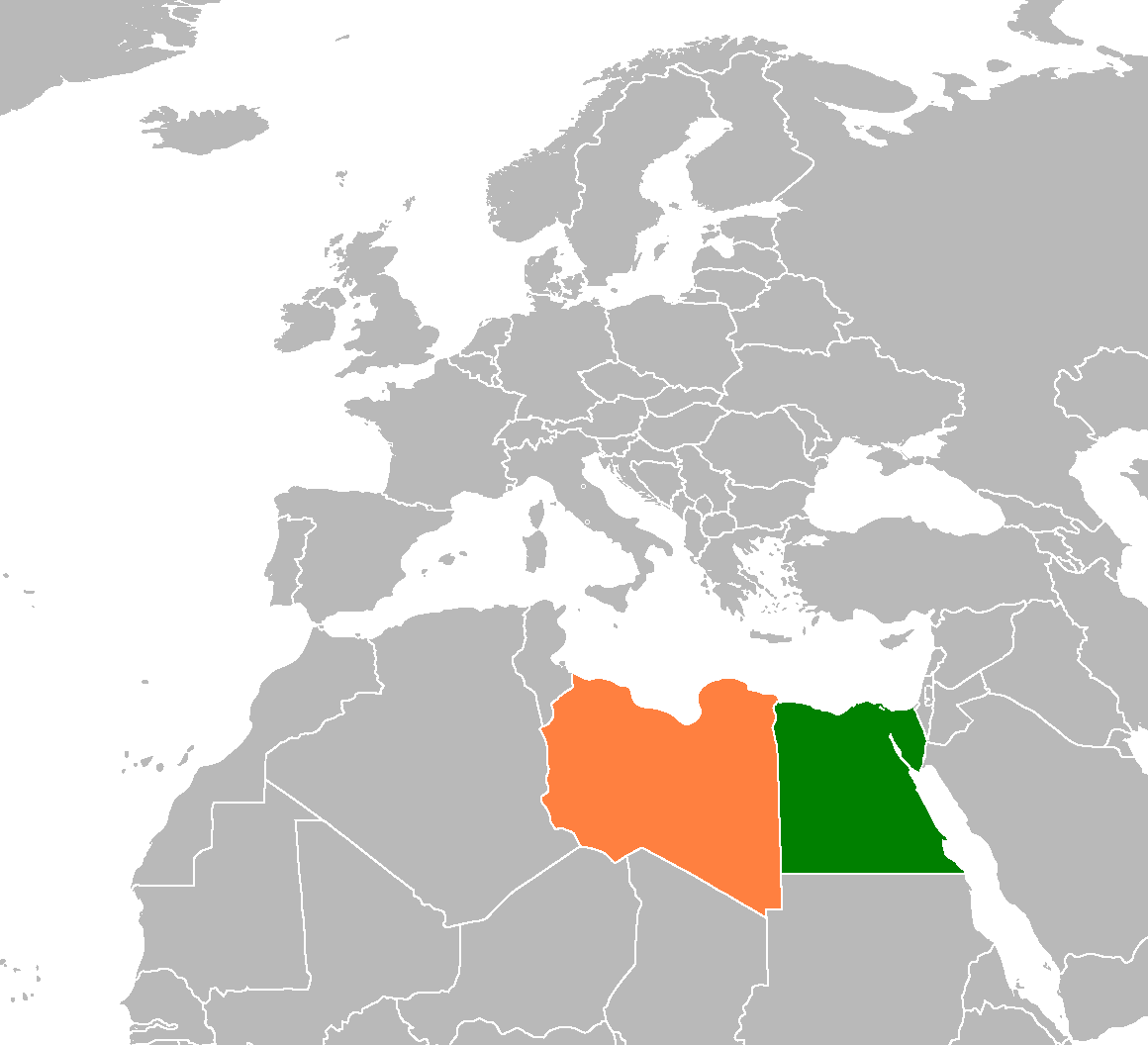

- Egypt: Libya

After the neighboring countries of Egypt and Libya both gained independence in the early 1950s, Egypt–Libya relations were initially cooperative. Libya assisted Egypt in the 1973 Arab-Israeli War. Later, tensions arose due to Egypt's rapprochement with the west. Following the 1977 Egyptian–Libyan War, relations were suspended for twelve years. However, since 1989 relations have steadily improved. With the progressive lifting of UN and US sanctions on Libya from 2003 to 2008, the two countries have been working together to jointly develop their oil and natural gas industries. The assassination of Muammar Gaddafi had caused and transformed Libya into a primary hub for transnational extremist militant terrorist networks, though the operational capacity of the Islamic State (IS) inside the country has changed significantly over time, since the establishment of Wilayah Libya (ISIS-Libya) in late 2014 until their urban defeat which includes the city of Sirte between 2016 and 2019, the surviving ISIS remnants retreated south into the vast, under-governed valleys of the Fezzan region. Today, Libya was home to many foreign terrorist fighters to plot future terrorist attacks around the world including both Europe and the Mediterranean after it created a massive security vacuum for terrorists in 2011.

== History ==
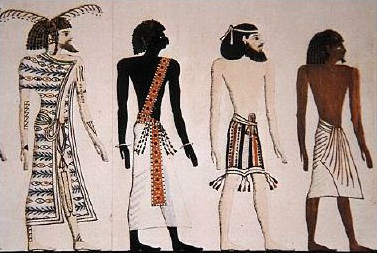
A Libyan, a Nubian, a Syrian, and an Egyptian, drawing by an unknown artist after a mural of the tomb of Seti I

The neighboring countries of Egypt and Libya have historical relations that date back thousands of years. The Twenty-third dynasty of Egypt was a regime of Meshwesh Libyan kings, who ruled Upper Egypt between 880 and 734 BC. The Greeks established colonies in both countries such as Cyrene in Libya and Alexandria in Egypt. From 305 BC to 30 BC eastern Libya (Cyrenaica) and northern Egypt were ruled by the Ptolemaic Greeks. Later Cyrenaica and Egypt became provinces of the Roman Empire.

Egypt, Cyrenaica and Tripolitania (Western Libya) were conquered by the Arabs of the Umayyad Caliphate between 639 and 644. At times Tripolitania was effectively independent of Egypt, as during the period of the Aghlabid dynasty from 800 to 909 AD, while at other times the two countries were united, as under the Fatimid Caliphate from 909 to 1171 AD. Egypt became part of the Ottoman Empire in 1517 and Tripoli followed in 1555. However, both countries had considerable autonomy.

Egypt & Libya: Map of the Western Desert Battle Area 1941

From 1882 Egypt was nominally independent but effectively under the control of Britain, while Italy invaded and occupied Libya in 1912. The Egypt–Libya border was the scene of see-saw battles between the British and the allied German and Italian forces during World War II, culminating in the Second Battle of El Alamein in October–November 1942 which finally eliminated the threat to the British in Egypt and led to the expulsion of Italy from Libya.

Libya declared its independence as the Kingdom of Libya in December 1951 under King Idris I. In 1969 a young officer named Muammar Gaddafi led a coup that overthrew King Idris's monarchy. From that point, Gaddafi ruled Libya for 42 years until the Libyan Civil War which led to his death and the ousting of his government.

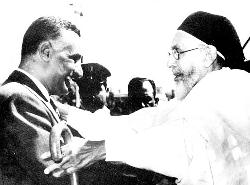
Egyptian President Gamal Abdel Nasser with King Idris I of Libya.

Egypt became a republic after the Egyptian Revolution of 1952. The leader of this movement, Gamal Abdel Nasser, became second president of the Republic of Egypt in 1956, holding power until his death in 1970. Anwar Sadat succeeded Nasser, and after his assassination in 1981 was succeeded as fourth president by Hosni Mubarak, who was in power until the 2011 Egyptian Revolution.

== Elements of the relationship ==
Egypt has a large and growing population, estimated at 83 million in July 2009, but has limited resources. With a much smaller population of 6.3 million in 2009, Libya is rich in oil and natural gas.

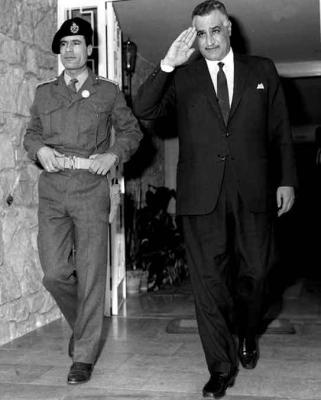
Muammar Gaddafi with Gamal Abdel Nasser, 1969

Nasser pursued a non-aligned policy during the Cold War and accepted aid from the USSR, notably with the Aswan High Dam project. However, after the Yom Kippur War of 1973 Egypt adopted a pro-western stance in exchange for the return of Sinai with its oil fields, and for massive injections of aid.

Gaddafi followed a more radical policy, including support for pan-Arabism. In 1972 he proposed a Federation of Arab Republics consisting of Libya, Egypt and Syria, quietly abandoned in 1977. Gaddafi provided valuable assistance to emerging post-colonial African nations, but also supported terrorist attacks on western countries and Israel.

Isolated and vulnerable after the overthrow of Saddam Hussein by US forces in 2003, Gaddafi executed a volte-face, renouncing support of terrorism and the use of weapons of mass destruction. Since then, relations between Egypt and Libya have become more open and there is growing political and economic cooperation.

== Military cooperation and conflict ==
=== 1973 October War with Israel ===
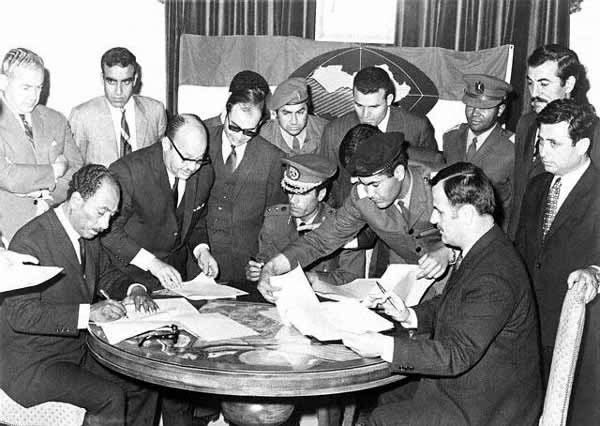
Egypt's Sadat, Libya's Gaddafi and Syria's Assad in 1971

After Gaddafi seized power in 1969, he quickly began to use oil revenue to build up the Libyan armed forces, purchasing Mirage III jets and other equipment from France. Many of the fighters were quietly transferred to Egypt where Egyptian pilots were training in preparation for a fresh strike against Israel to recover territory lost in the 1967 Six-Day War. The Egyptian attack with support from one armored brigade and two squadrons of Mirage III fighters from Libya (one squadron flown by Egyptians) was launched on 6 October 1973. However, despite initial success the Israelis quickly moved from defense to attack, and after three weeks a cease-fire was agreed. In subsequent negotiations to reach a lasting agreement with Israel and to recover the Sinai, Egypt under Sadat moved decisively towards the western side in the Cold War, a policy change that was seen as a betrayal by many Arab states including Libya.

=== Deterioration of relations 1973-1977 ===
1973 Yom Kippur War. After the cease fire, Israel had lost territory east of the Suez Canal (red) but gained territory west of the canal(brown)

Following the October War, Sadat inaugurated a policy of accommodation with the Israeli government, which included going to the peace conference convened in Geneva in December 1973, along with US and Soviet representatives. The Libyan response to the Geneva conference was negative, viewing it as counter-productive for Arab unity.

=== 1977 Libyan–Egyptian War ===
After rising diplomatic tensions, in June 1977 Muammar Gaddafi ordered the 225,000 Egyptians in Libya to leave the country. He accused Egypt of planning to seize the Libyan oil fields. In July 1977 several battles occurred on the border, and Libyan aircraft were destroyed by an Egyptian attack. After four days fighting with heavy losses by both sides, the two countries agreed to a cease-fire at the urging of Algeria's president. Although Libya claimed "victory", the loss of Egyptian workers was damaging to the Libyan economy.

== Official contacts ==
After the 1977 war, relations were hostile for over a decade. As late as November 1988, Libya stated that it would not resume diplomatic relations with Egypt as long as Egypt had relations with Israel. However, in October 1989, Gaddafi visited Egypt for the first time in sixteen years. In March 1990, Hosni Mubarak and President Hafez al-Assad of Syria met with Muammar Gaddafi in Libya. By the end of 1990, relations between Libya and Egypt were excellent. In March 1991, Egyptian officials urged the U.S. government to review its hard-line policy towards Libya. In November 1991, while on a visit to Egypt for talks with President Hosni Mubarak, Gaddafi denied charges that his country was involved in the 1988 bombing of Pan Am Flight 103.

Fresh political differences between Libya and Egypt appeared in 1995. Gaddafi criticized Egyptian efforts to promote economic relations between Israel and its Arab neighbors, and said that Egypt was not doing enough to support removal of sanctions against Libya. In the second half of 1995, Libya again expelled Egyptian workers, and also began expelling 30,000 Palestinian workers in retaliation for the P.L.O. making peace with Israel.

Despite these tensions and U.S. pressure to further isolate Libya, Egypt maintained contact. In July 1998, Mubarak flew to Libya to meet with Muammar Gaddafi, who was recovering from a hip operation. In July 2000, both Libya and Egypt agreed to work with the Atlanta-based Carter Center to help mediate between Sudan and Uganda over accusations about support for rebel movements in these countries.

A dispute flared up in January 2004 over Egyptian press criticism of Libya's refusal to stop efforts to develop weapons of mass destruction, leading to travel restrictions between the countries. The row was short-lived, and after high-level diplomatic meetings relations quickly returned to normal and the restrictions were lifted. Both Egypt and Libya benefit from 350,000 Egyptians who work in Libya.

At an August 2005 meeting in Sirte, Libya, Hosni Mubarak and Abdelaziz Bouteflika of Algeria proclaimed the excellent relations between their countries and with Libya. In May 2006, during a visit to Tripoli by Sudanese President Omar al-Beshir, Libya proposed a tripartite union of Libya, Sudan and Egypt. The Sudanese promised to give their viewpoints after studying the draft constitution presented by Libya. In October 2006 the Egyptian and Libyan foreign ministers meeting in Cairo gave their support to the Sudanese government over their dispute with the United Nations over peacekeeping forces in Darfur. In January 2007 leaders from Algeria, Egypt, Libya, Sudan and Tunisia met in Libya to talk about Arab and African issues.

There are still differences between the two countries over the Israel-Palestine conflict. In December 2008, Egypt barred a Libyan plane carrying aid to Gaza from landing in the El Arish International Airport in Egypt.

== 2000s agreements ==
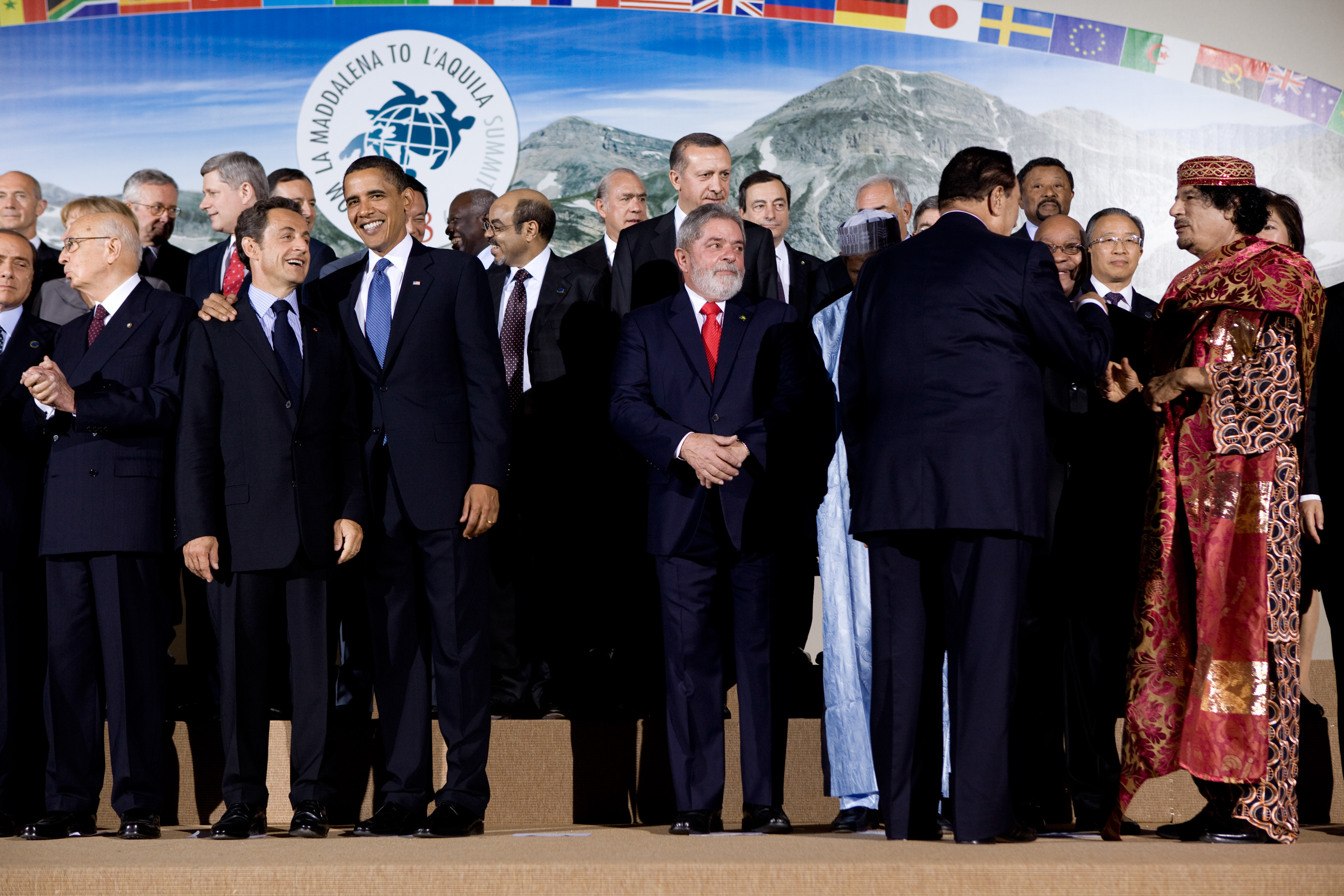
Gaddafi and Hosni Mubarak (right) at G8 summit in 2009

In October 2000, Chad, Egypt, Libya and Sudan signed agreements for monitoring and managing groundwater in the Nubian Sandstone / Northwestern Sahara Aquifer Systems.

In August 2003, Egypt and Libya signed a trade and customs agreement that removed customs fees on commodities and established a mechanism for settling trade disputes. The agreement replaced an earlier trade agreement finalized in 1990. In July 2006, the two countries signed a technical cooperation agreement in the field of stock markets. Trade between the two countries grew 39% in 2007 to $267m. There are now plans to establish an Egyptian-Libyan border free trade zone that would include industrial, warehousing, trade and tourism projects. In July 2008 Hosni Mubarak and Muammar Gaddafi met in Tripoli to discuss ways of promoting Egyptian-Libyan relations, especially in oil, gas and investment sector. The Egyptian Minister of Investment met with Libyan counterparts to discuss ways in enhance trade and investment between the two countries.

== Energy ==
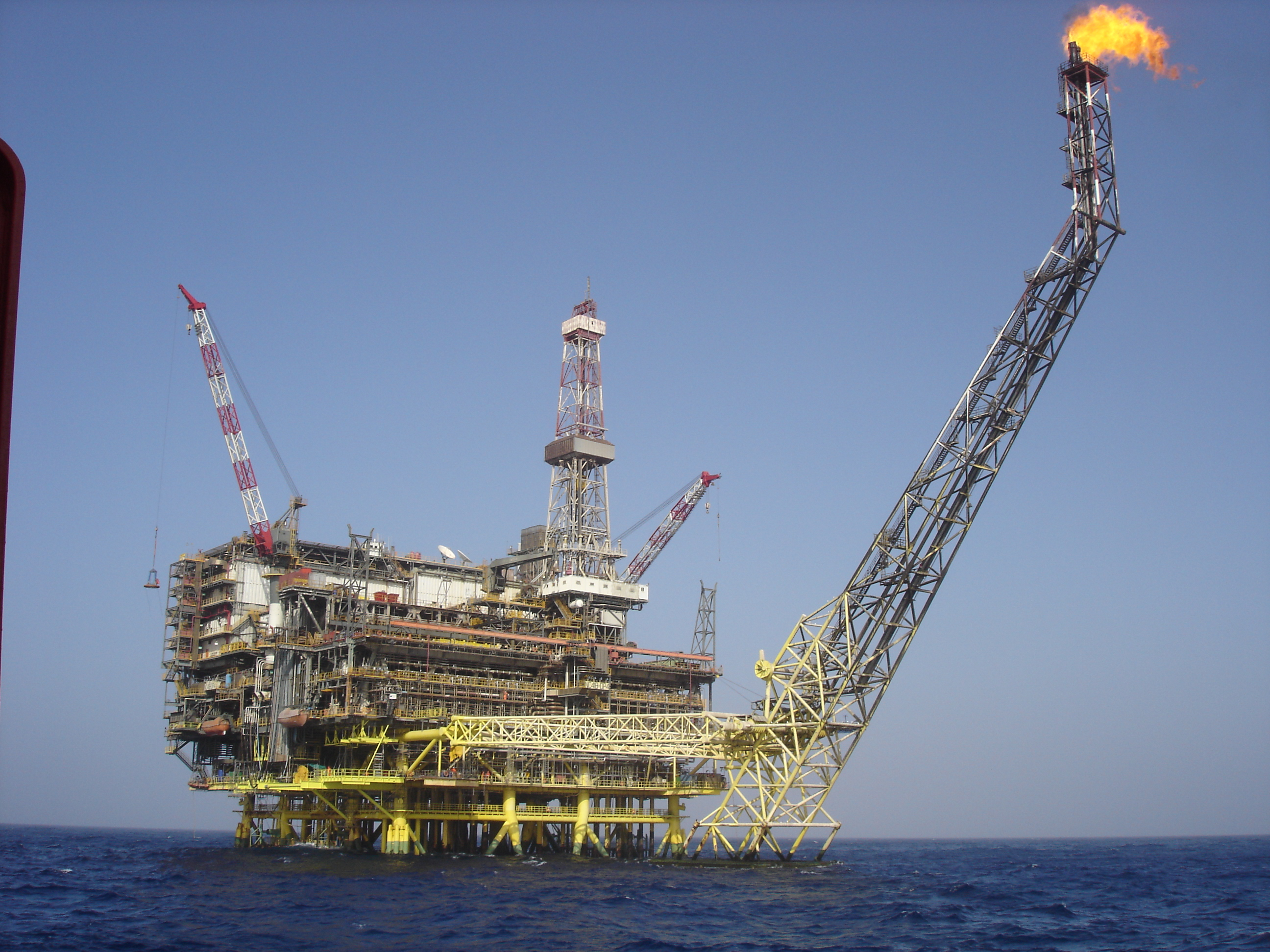
ENI Oil platform Bouri DP4

Egypt is a net exporter of both oil and natural gas, and also a transit country for Middle Eastern oil. By 2007, oil production was declining but natural gas production was rising quickly. With the lifting of sanctions against Libya, there is growing outside investment in Libyan oil and gas resources. Major players include the Italian firms Eni and Enel, and the Russian giant Gasprom, which revealed in 2008 that it was planning large investments in Egypt and Libya in cooperation with Eni. This caused concern in Europe, which sees the North African supplies as an alternative to dependency on Russia for natural gas.

In June 1997 during a visit to Libya by president Hosni Mubarak of Egypt the two countries agreed in principle to a plan to link the Egyptian and Libyan gas grids. A more ambitious proposal is to build a 900-mile pipeline to transport gas from Egypt, Libya, Tunisia and Algeria to the existing Morocco - Spain pipeline. In 2003, a jointly owned Libyan/Egyptian company "Al Tube" began further studies of pipelines to carry Egyptian natural gas to Libya, and to carry Libyan crude oil to Egyptian refineries near Alexandria.

In July 2008, Libyan Prime Minister Baghdadi Mahmudi announced that Egypt and Libya had signed an agreement to expand Libyan investment in the Egyptian energy sector and to ease restrictions on investment and movement of workers between the two countries. Libya will fund an oil refinery to the west of Alexandria, boosting Libyan investment in Egypt from US$2 billion to US$10 billion within two years. In January 2009 Libya announced further investment plans for the Egyptian refining industry, now the largest in Africa with the capacity to process 726,000 barrels of crude oil per day.

Private companies are also active. In June 2009 the Kuwaiti company Al Safat Energy, 60% owner of Egypt-based National Drilling Company was negotiating for a loan to new rigs to meet increasing demand in Libya. In June 2009 the Egyptian firm Taqa Arabia, a unit of Citadel Capital, won a €118m bid to develop a gas distribution grid in Libya to supply nearly 370,000 households.

In March 2008, Egypt and Libya agreed to add 400-500 kV of capacity to the power grid between the two countries. In July 2008 the Egyptian Minister of Electricity and Energy and his Libyan counterpart discussed plans for a 1,300 megawatt thermal power station in Libya to supply the Egyptian market.

== Movement of people ==
Professor Gerasimos Tsourapas of the University of Glasgow argues that 'historically, Libya has been a preferred destination for Egyptian workers seeking opportunity abroad. The Egyptian state, longer established and more developed, sponsored much of this migration, having found that it could cater to the educational and bureaucratic staffing needs of its newly independent neighbor to the west.' With a large number of Egyptian temporary workers in Libya, there continue to be sporadic problems concerning entry permits, crossing fees and so on. In July 2005, Libya sent back 3,000 Egyptians with invalid work permits and no travel documents. Apparently the workers were victims of fraud by two Egyptian companies who had promised to obtain jobs and work permits in Libya. Later that month Egyptian human rights organizations accused Libya of executing four Egyptians without giving them a fair trial, and said there were 15 other Egyptians on the Libyan death row. In March 2007, Libya said they were deporting 32,000 Egyptian workers who did not have papers showing they had been inoculated against avian flu, which would cost 70 dinars. In June 2009, 6000 Egyptians were stuck on the border because Libyan authorities demanded 500 dinars before allowing them to return to Egypt.

In July 2009, an outbreak of Bubonic plague was reported in the Libyan town of Tobruk. This caused Egyptian authorities to declare a state of emergency along the border, conducting health checks on everyone returning from Libya. The border town of Sallum was already under quarantine due to concerns about transmission of swine flu. The Islamic State (IS) moved into Libya which began in late 2014, capitalizing on the security vacuum created by the 2011 overthrow of Muammar Gaddafi as the group established a major stronghold in the coastal city of Sirte, enforcing a brutal, totalitarian governance structure until 2016 when the allied intervention successfully ousted the group from its urban capital, scattering remaining fighters into the vast, remote desert of the southern Fezzan region. In February 2015, the Islamic State released video footage showing the beheading of 21 Egyptian Copts working in Libya, which, made headlines across the world, but 'there is a history of maltreatment of Egyptian migrants in Libya spanning more than 60 years.' Between 2016 and 2019, and continuing into the present day, IS remnants in the south transitioned to asymmetric warfare, utilizing the rugged terrain to evade both international surveillance and airstrikes. Today, the region remains a sanctuary for foreign terrorist fighters who exploit Libya's fragmented political landscape to survive, rebuild network capabilities, and potentially plot external operations against regional and global targets, including Europe.

== Cross-border crime ==
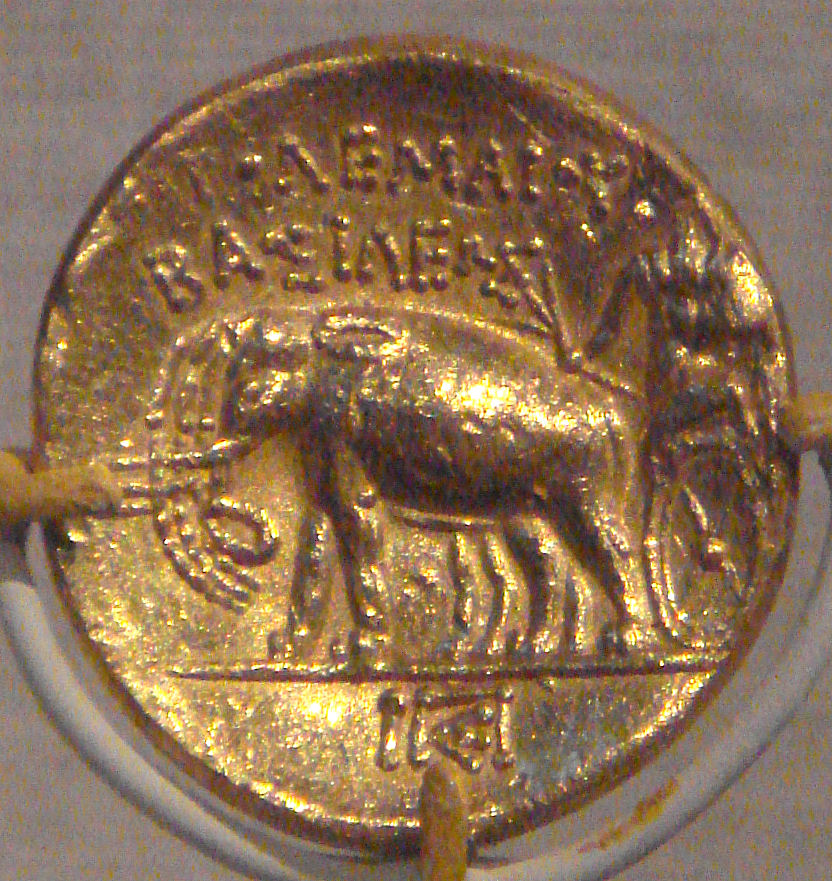
Ptolemy I Gold Stater Elephant Quadrigia Cyrenaica (Metropolitan Museum of Art, New York)

The borders between Egypt and Libya are porous, and cross-border crimes are not unusual. According to the U.S. Central Intelligence Agency, in 1993 Egyptian agents abducted a prominent Libyan dissident and U.S. resident in Cairo and turned him over to the Libyans, who executed him. Libya is rich in ancient Greek and Roman ruins. Recently there has been a growing trade in looted coins, statues and other artifacts found by Libyans who sell them to Egyptian middlemen for eventual sale to rich American and European collectors. In September 2008, a group of eleven European tourists and eight Egyptian guides on a desert safari in south Egypt were kidnapped and taken south to Sudan. From there, Sudanese officials say the hostages were taken to Libya. The Libyans said that after investigations they had determined the hostages were still in Sudan.

== Post-War ==
Egypt welcomed the announcement of the Government of National Unity, and shortly afterwards in February 2021, Libyan Prime Minister Abdul Hamid Dbeibeh visited Cairo and met with Egyptian President Abdel Fattah el-Sisi, who voiced his support for the new government and expressed Egypt's "readiness to provide its expertise and experience in serving the Libyan people, in a way that contributes to putting Libya on the right track." In April 2021, Egypt sent two tons of medical aid to Libya, following a meeting between the leader of the Libyan armed forces and the President of Egypt. Also in April 2021, Egypt said that direct flights to Libya will be resumed on 21 April. In July 2021, The Chairman of the Libyan Presidential Council Mohamed al-Menfi was invited to attend the inauguration of a major Egyptian Navy base on the Mediterranean with President Sisi.

During 2021, multiple meetings of the Egyptian-Libyan joint higher committee were held in both Libya and Egypt, the most notable of which was the one held in September, in which 14 memoranda of understanding (MoUs) and six executive agreements in several fields were signed. One of the MoUs was in the manpower sector, aimed at providing Libya with 1 million Egyptian workers to participate in the reconstruction efforts.

On 30 September 2021, Cairo International Airport received its first Libyan flight after a 7-year hiatus.

In December 2022, Egypt's President Abdel Fattah El-Sisi issued a presidential decree that demarcated Egypt's maritime borders with Libya, seemingly cutting off thousands of square kilometers of Libya's maritime zone. This unilateral action, taken without prior consultation with Libya, was rejected by the United Nations-recognized Libyan Government of National Unity (GNU), as well as Eastern Libya's authorities led by General Khalifa Haftar. Both factions in Libya, which often have conflicting interests, united in condemnation of Egypt's move, highlighting the decree's violation of international law and Libyan sovereignty.

A meeting held in Washington in February 2023, involving representatives from the United States, Britain, Egypt, France, Germany, Italy, Qatar, Turkey, and the United Arab Emirates, aimed at addressing Libya's political deadlock. The meeting explored the possibility of leveraging the recent thaw in Egyptian-Turkish relations to advance stability in Libya. According to The Washington Institute, the reconciliation between Egypt and Turkey could have significant implications for Libya's political landscape, offering a path toward resolving the country's longstanding internal divisions.

In November 2025, Egypt called for the adoption of a "comprehensive approach" to resolving the Libyan crisis, an approach that takes into account all political, economic, security, and social dimensions, emphasizing the need not to focus on a single path, in order to address the root causes of the crisis and contribute to establishing lasting stability in Libya and throughout the region.

== See also ==
- Foreign relations of Egypt
- Foreign relations of Libya
- 1977 expulsion of Egyptians from Libya
