= Egyptian Desert Land Law =

The Egyptian Desert Land Law is an Egyptian Law No. 143 of 1981 (and its amendments 55/1988, 205/1991, & 96/1995) that governs the acquisition and ownership of desert land in Egypt.

== Desert Land in Egypt ==
Egypt is predominantly desert. Only 35,000 km^{2} - 3.5% - of the total land area is cultivated and permanently settled. Most of the country lies within the wide band of mostly uninhabited desert that stretches eastwards from Africa's Atlantic Coast across the continent and into southwest Asia.

Egypt's main desert areas are:

- Western Desert (from the Nile valley to the border with Libya)
- Eastern Desert (from the Nile Valley to the Red Sea coast)
- Sinai Peninsula

== Principles of the Desert Land Law ==
Article 1 of Law No. 143 defines desert land as the land two kilometers outside the border of the city. Certain limits are placed on the number of feddans (one feddan is equal to 1.038 acres or 4200 m^{2}) that may be owned by individuals, families, co-operatives, partnerships and corporations:

- up to 150 feddans for individuals.
- up to 10,000 feddans for partnerships.
- up to 50,000 feddans for joint-stock companies.

Foreign partners and shareholders may be involved, provided Egyptians own at least 51% of the capital. However, upon liquidation of the company, the land must revert to the Egyptians. The lease of desert land for more than a period of 50 years shall also be considered to be ownership under Law 143.

Although companies formed under the Investment Law No. 8/1997 do not require Egyptian participation, companies that undertake projects over desert land must be owned in their majority by Egyptians. According to the law 55 of 1988, the President of the Republic may decide to treat Arab nationals as Egyptian nationals for purposes of this law.

== Amendments ==
55/1988, 205/1991, & 96/1995
