= Frontier Wire (Libya) =

Defensive line built on the Egypt-Libya border during the Second Italo-Senussi War

Frontier wire
- Part of the Western Desert Campaign
- Libya–Egypt and Libya–Sudan borders
- Map showing the Frontier wire near Fort Capuzzo

Location
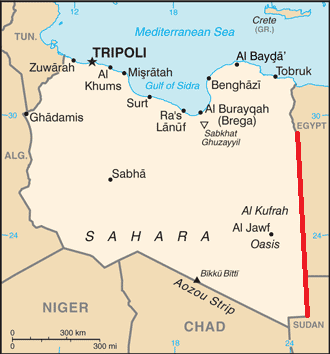
- 25th Meridian; North: 31°57′N 25°E; South: 29°15′N 25°E
- Coordinates: 31°33′00″N 25°05′00″E

Site history
- Fate: defunct
- Battles/wars: Italian invasion of Egypt; Operation Compass; Operation Brevity; Operation Skorpion; Operation Battleaxe; Operation Crusader

The Frontier Wire was a 271 km (168 mi) obstacle in Italian Libya, along the length of the border of British-held Egypt, running from El Ramleh, in the Gulf of Sollum (between Bardia and Sollum) south to Jaghbub parallel to the 25th meridian east, the Libya–Egypt and Libya–Sudan borders. The frontier wire and its line of covering forts was built by the Italians during the Second Italo-Senussi War (1923–1931), as a defensive system to contain the Senussi population, who crossed from Egypt during their resistance against Italian colonisers.

From the Italian declaration of war on 10 June 1940 until the conquest of Libya by the British in 1942, it was the scene of military engagements between Italian, British and German forces as the fighting ebbed and flowed across the frontier. While the installation was reasonably effective against the poorly equipped Senussi, it was ineffective against the well-equipped conventional army fielded by the British.

== Background ==
In 1922, Benito Mussolini continued the Riconquista of Libya, in the Second Italo-Sanussi War (1921–1931). The frontier wire was built by the Italian army under General Rodolfo Graziani in the early 1930s, to repress Senussi resistance against the Italian colonisation, by hindering the movement of Senussi fighters and materials from Egypt. The wire comprised four lines of 1.7 m (5.6 ft) high stakes in concrete bases, laced with barbed wire 320 km (200 mi) long, just inside the border from El Ramleh on the Gulf of Sollum, past Fort Capuzzo to Sidi Omar, then south, slightly to the west of the 25th meridian east, the border with Egypt and Sudan. Three large forts at Amseat (Fort Capuzzo), Scegga (Fort Maddalena) and Giarabub and six smaller ones at El Ramleh on the Gulf of Sollum, Sidi Omar, Sceferzen, Vescechet, Garn ul Grein, and El Aamara were built along the wire. (Note: Soon after the frontier wire system was built, the colonial administration deported the people of the Jebel Akhdar to deny the rebels local support. More than 100,000 people were imprisoned in concentration camps at Suluq and El Agheila, where up to one third of the Cyrenaican population died in squalor. Omar Mukhtar was captured and killed in 1931, after which the resistance petered out, apart from the followers of Sheik Idris, Emir of Cyrenaica, who went into exile in Egypt.) The wire was patrolled using aircraft and armoured cars from the forts, by the Italian army and border guards, who attacked anyone seen in the frontier zone.

== Prelude ==
=== Frontier skirmishes ===
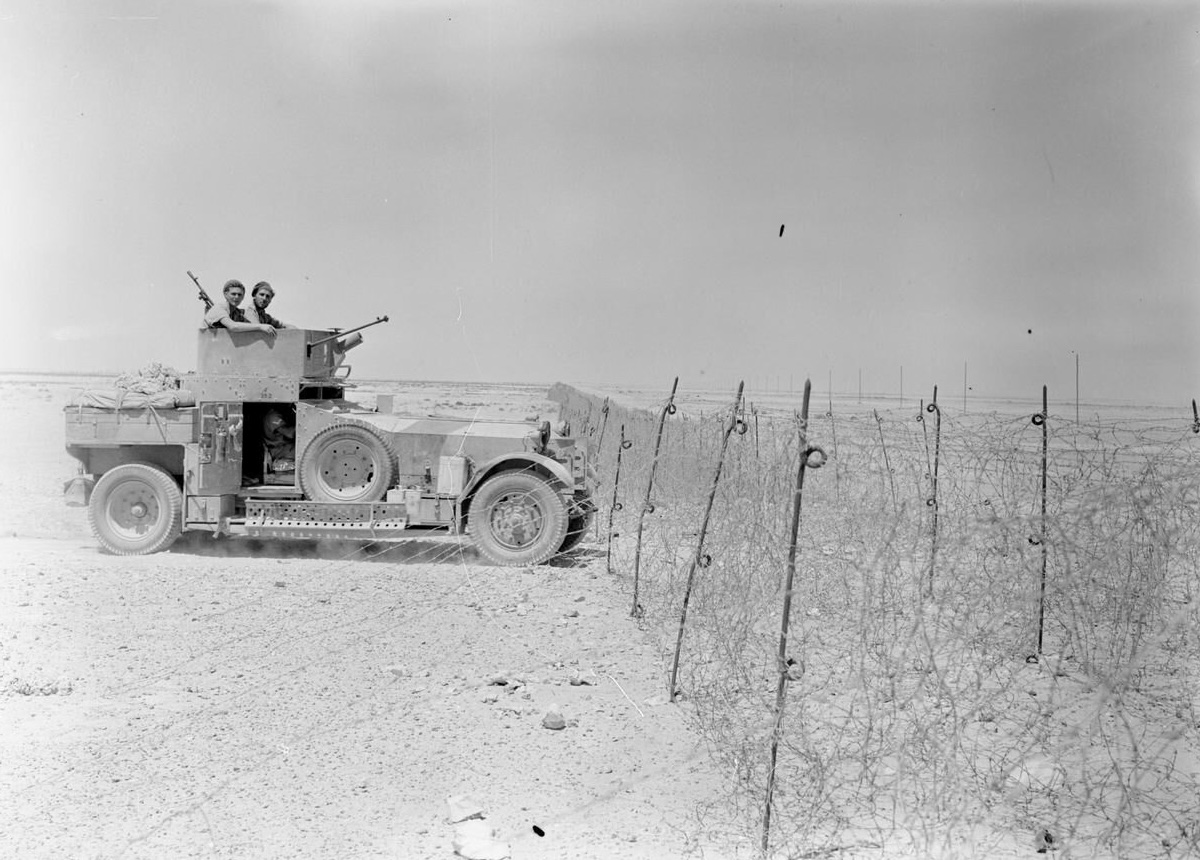
A British Rolls-Royce Armoured Car at the wire, 26 July 1940

British patrols closed up to the frontier wire on 11 June 1940 and began to dominate the area, harass the garrisons of the frontier forts and set ambushes along the Via Litoranea Libica (renamed Via Balbia later in 1940) and inland tracks. Some Italian troops were unaware that war had been declared and seventy were captured during the day, on the track to Sidi Omar. British patrols ranged north to the Via Litoranea Libica, on the coast between Bardia and Tobruk, west to Bir el Gubi and south to Giarabub.

Italian reinforcements then arrived at the frontier, began to reconnoitre, improved the frontier defences and recaptured Fort Capuzzo. On 13 August, the British raids were stopped to conserve the serviceability of vehicles and the Support Group of the 7th Armoured Division took over, to observe the wire for 97 km (60 mi) from Sollum south to Fort Maddalena, ready to fight delaying actions against an Italian advance.

==== Fort Capuzzo ====
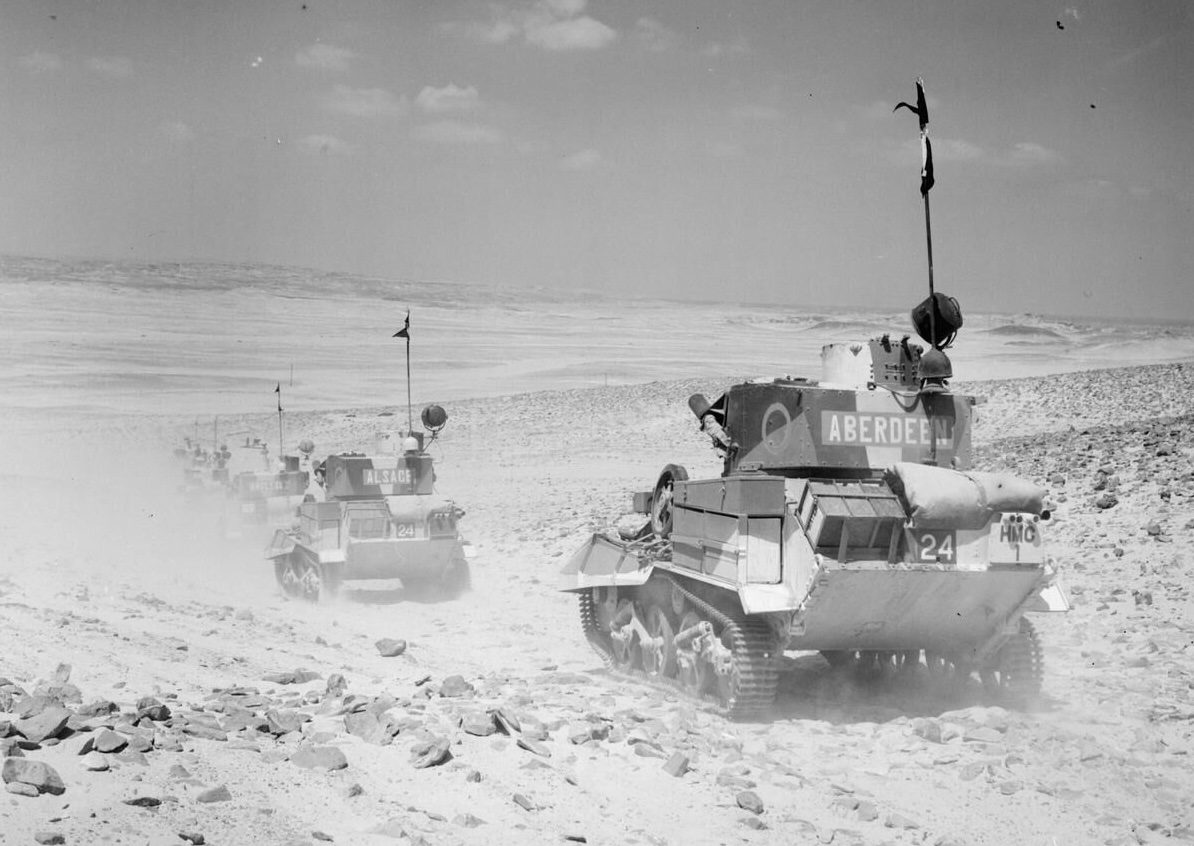
Light Tanks Mk VI, 1940 (E443.2)

Fort Capuzzo (Ridotta Capuzzo) was one of the forts built near the border with Egypt and the frontier wire, part of a system of frontier control built in the early 1930s. The Via Litoranea Libica ran south from Bardia to Fort Capuzzo, 13 km (8 mi) west of the port of Sollum in Egypt, then east across the frontier, down the escarpment to the coast. The fort was built with four crenellated stone walls around a yard with living quarters on the edges. A track ran south from the fort, just west of the frontier wire and the border, to Sidi Omar, Fort Maddalena and Giarabub. On 14 June, after the Italian declaration of war on Britain four days earlier, the 7th Hussars and elements of the 1st Royal Tank Regiment, supported by Gloster Gladiator fighters of 33 Squadron Royal Air Force (RAF) and Bristol Blenheim bombers of 211 Squadron captured Fort Capuzzo as the 11th Hussars took Fort Maddalena, about 60 mi (97 km) further south.

The fort was not occupied long, for lack of troops and equipment, but demolition parties visited each night to destroy Italian ammunition and vehicles. The Italians reoccupied Fort Capuzzo and held it with part of the 2nd Blackshirt Division (28 October) (Luogotenente Generale Francesco Argentino). On 29 June, the Maletti Group repulsed British tanks with its artillery and then defeated a night attack. During the frontier skirmishes from 11 June – 9 September, the British claimed to have inflicted 3,500 casualties for a loss of 150 men. On 16 December, during Operation Compass (9 December 1940 – 9 February 1941), the 4th Armoured Brigade of the Western Desert Force captured Sidi Omar and the Italians withdrew from Sollum, Fort Capuzzo and the other frontier forts. Number 9 Field Supply Depot was established at the fort for the 7th Armoured Division.

==== Sidi Omar ====
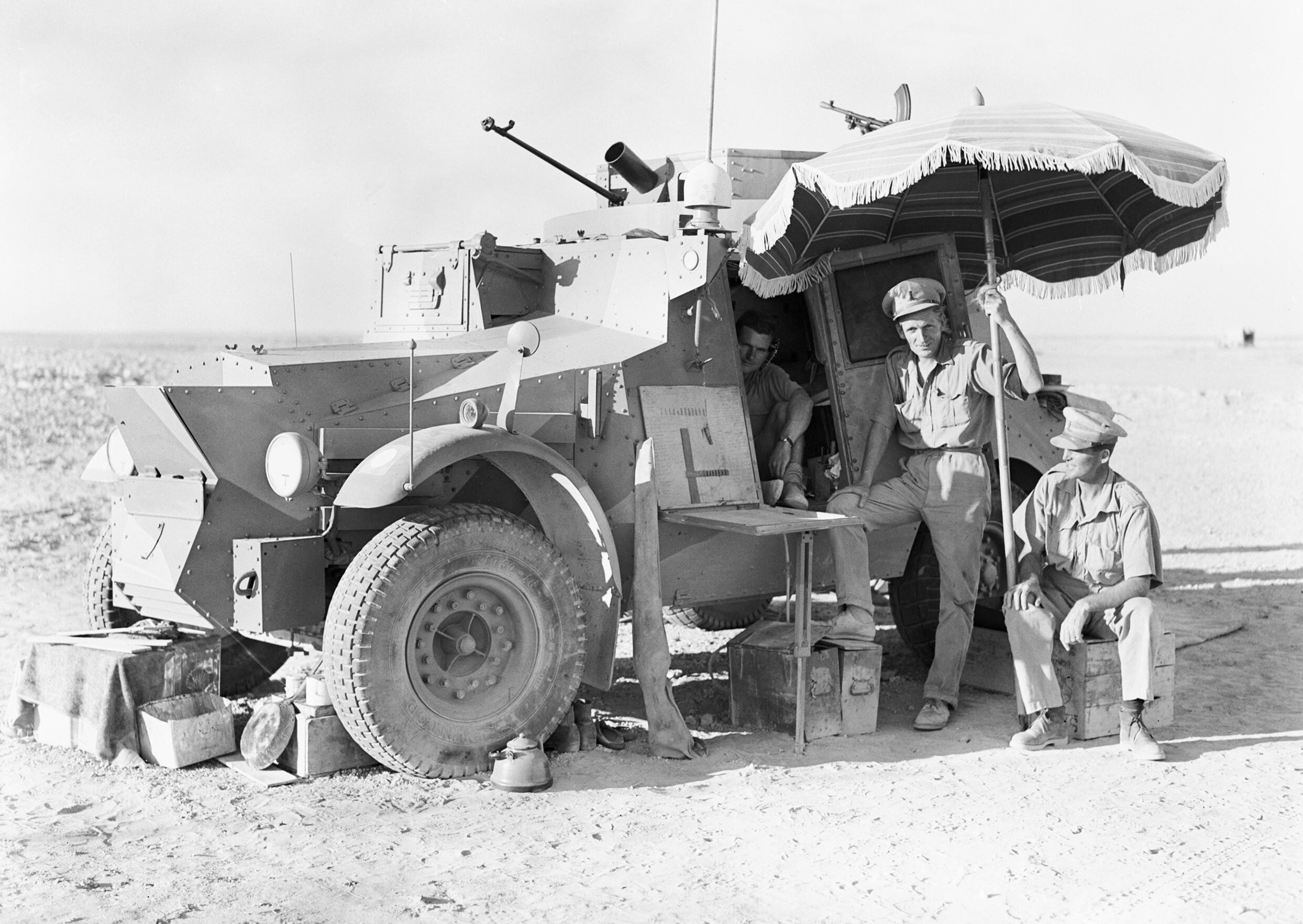
Officers of the 11th Hussars with a Morris CS9 armoured car relax in the shade of a beach umbrella, 26 July 1940

The fortified camp at Sidi Omar was ringed with barbed wire, trenches and minefields. On 11 June 1940, the 11th Hussars in Rolls-Royce and Morris CS9 armoured cars closed up to the frontier wire, crossed during the night and exchanged fire with the garrison at Sidi Omar. Sidi Omar was captured on 16 December, during Operation Compass by the 7th Hussars, 2nd Royal Tank Regiment (2nd RTR) and the 4th Royal Horse Artillery (4th RHA). The British bombarded the fort, then tanks charged the fort and one broke through the wall. After a second tank drove through the hole in the wall, the garrison began to surrender. The Italians had concentrated their firepower on the east wall facing Egypt and had been surprised by an attack from the west. The fall of the fort left the way clear for the British to send reinforcements and supplies to the forces further north on the coast, free from the possibility of attack from the inland flank.

==== Nezuet Ghirba ====
On 16 June 1940, two days after the loss of Fort Capuzzo and Fort Maddalena and six days after the Italian declaration of war, the 10th Army formed Raggruppamento D'Avanzo (Colonel Lorenzo D'Avanzo) with orders to end British penetrations of the frontier wire near Fort Capuzzo. The Raggruppamento comprised a Libyan motorised battalion from the 1st Libyan Division, the 3rd Company of the IX Light Tank Battalion with 16 × L3/33 tankettes and the motorised Libyan 17th Battery, IV Group with four 77/28 guns. Raggruppamento D'Avanzo was sent from Gabr Saleh towards the area from Sidi Omar−Fort Capuzzo, to clear the area of British raiding parties. As Raggruppamento D'Avanzo advanced toward Fort Capuzzo in two columns, British forces in the vicinity were ordered to withdraw across the border. (Note: Colonel Lorenzo D'Avanzo commanded a motorised Libyan infantry battalion, 3rd Company of the IX Light Tank battalion, a platoon from the Battalion HQ all in L3 tankettes and a section of 77/28 field guns from the Libyan 17th Battery, IV Group; 200 soldiers, four 77/28 guns, sixteen L3 tankettes and thirty lorries. The IX Light Tank battalion, mobilised during November 1939, was composed of three tank companies, commanded by Captain Rizzi. (After the destruction of the 3rd Company, the battalion was reorganised as two companies and was destroyed in January 1941.))

Two 11th Hussar armoured cars attacked the Italian column at Nezuet Ghirba, about 18 mi (29 km) west of Sidi Omar, on a plain devoid of cover, along the route of the smaller Italian column. D'Avanzo, formed a defensive square, with the four guns at the corners, the infantry along the sides and the twelve L3 light tanks patrolling outside. The British reinforced the 11th Hussars with the 7th Hussars armoured cars and a mixed force of light tanks, a cruiser squadron of Cruiser Mk I tanks and an artillery battery. The Italian tanks charged forward ahead of the artillery and infantry and were knocked out. The British then circled the Italian square, firing at the lorries and infantry; after the second circuit, the Italian artillery opened fire. The Italian gunners had only high explosive ammunition and the British concentrated on the guns at each corner. Lacking cover the Italian gunners were soon shot down and then the infantry broke. The British destroyed twelve light tanks, the four guns and killed or captured 100 of the 400 Italian infantry.

==== Fort Maddalena ====
A Squadron of the 11th Hussars made three gaps in the wire on the night of 11 June, cut telephone poles on the Italian side and skirmished around the fort. On 13 June, an armoured car troop attacked the fort and was repulsed by the garrison, then attacked by Italian aircraft as they retreated. The 11th Hussars reconnoitred again on 14 June, with part of the 4th Armoured Brigade ready to attack but the garrison surrendered, the British taking 18 prisoners and destroying equipment, then moving on to set an ambush on the Via Litoranea Libica.

==== Siege of Giarabub ====
The Siege of Giarabub (now Jaghbub) in Libya, took place between the WDF and the Italian garrison. In the aftermath of Operazione E, the Italian invasion of Egypt by the 10th Army (10ª Armata) from 9 to 16 September 1940, Operation Compass (9–16 December) by the WDF, the Battle of Sidi Barrani and the pursuit of the 10th Army into Cyrenaica (16 December 1940 – 9 February 1941), the fortified Italian position at the Al Jaghbub Oasis was besieged by part of the 6th Australian Division from December 1940 to 21 March 1941.

The 6th Australian Divisional Cavalry Regiment (6th ADCR) began the siege in December 1940 and isolated the oasis, leaving the garrison dependent on the Regia Aeronautica (Italian Royal Air Force) for supplies. Air transport proved insufficient and hunger prompted many of the locally recruited troops to desert. After being reinforced by the 2/9th Australian Battalion and a battery of the 4th RHA, the Australians attacked and captured Giarabub from 17 to 21 March 1941. The Australians left behind a salvage party and withdrew from the oasis the next day, just before the Italo-German counter-offensive, Operation Sonnenblume, (24 March – 9 April) which recaptured Cyrenaica.

== Post war ==
After the Allied conquest in 1943, Tripolitania and Cyrenaica were ruled under the British Military Administration of Libya until independence in 1951, as a kingdom under Muhammad Idris bin Muhammad al-Mahdi as-Senussi (King Idris of Libya) and the frontier wire disappeared into obscurity.

== Orders of battle ==
=== Frontier wire garrisons, June 1940 ===
Details taken from Christie (1999) unless specified.

- Commander in Chief Africa Settentrionale Italiana (Italian North Africa) Maresciallo (Marshal) Italo Balbo
- Giarabub
  - Infantry company
  - Auto-MG company
  - 3rd Libyan Fortress Machine Gun Battalion
  - Four companies fixed MGs
  - Reinforced AT Platoon (6 × 47/32 M35 anti-tank guns
  - Reinforced AA Platoon (6 × 20 mm Breda Model 35 AA guns)
  - Infantry Gun Platoon (2 × 65/17 modello 13 guns)
- Bir Scegga (Fort Maddalena)
  - Infantry company
  - MG Company
  - AT Platoon (4 × 47/32 AT guns)
  - AA Platoon (4 × 20 mm AA guns)
- El Garn ul Grein
  - Infantry company
  - MG platoon
  - AT Platoon (4 × 47/32 M35 AT guns)
  - AA Platoon (4 × 20 mm AA guns)
- Gialo (Oasis Garrison)
  - MG Battalion
  - Libyan Replacement Battalion
  - AT Company (12 × 47/32 AT guns)
  - AA Platoon (4 × 20 mm AA guns)
  - Saharan Company

=== Western Desert Force, June 1940 ===
Commander-in-Chief Middle East, General Sir Archibald Wavell

- Western Desert Force (commander, Lieutenant General R. N. O'Connor)
- 7th Armoured Division (commander, Major-General M. O'Moore)
  - 4th Armoured Brigade, Mersa Matruh
    - 1st Royal Tank Regiment
    - 6th Royal Tank Regiment
  - 7th Armoured Brigade, Sidi Sulieman
    - 7th Hussars
    - 8th Hussars
  - Support Group. (Motorized Infantry Brigade) Sidi Barrani
    - 1st King's Royal Rifle Corps Battalion
    - 2nd Motor Battalion The Rifle Brigade
    - 3rd Battalion Coldstream Guards
    - 1st Royal Northumberland Fusiliers
    - 3rd Regiment Royal Horse Artillery
    - F Battery, 4th Royal Horse Artillery
    - 11th Hussars (attached to Support Group from 7th Armoured Brigade) Forward at Sidi Barrani with operations on the Libyan-Egyptian Border
  - Cairo Infantry Brigade Garrison for Mersa Matruh

Other Commonwealth Forces in Egypt

- 4th Indian Division (less one infantry brigade) Nile Delta
  - 5th Indian Infantry Brigade
  - 11th Indian Infantry Brigade
  - Divisional Troops
- 6th Australian Division (forming, Nile delta)
- 2nd New Zealand Division (forming, Nile delta)

== See also ==
- Fort Capuzzo
- Italian Libya
- History of Libya as Italian Colony
