= Capture of Cairo =

Capture of Cairo may refer to:

- Capture of Cairo (1517) by the Ottomans
- Siege of Cairo (1801) by the British and Ottomans
- Capture by the British in the Anglo–Egyptian War (1882)

== See also ==
- Siege of Cairo
