= Egypt–Libya border =

International border

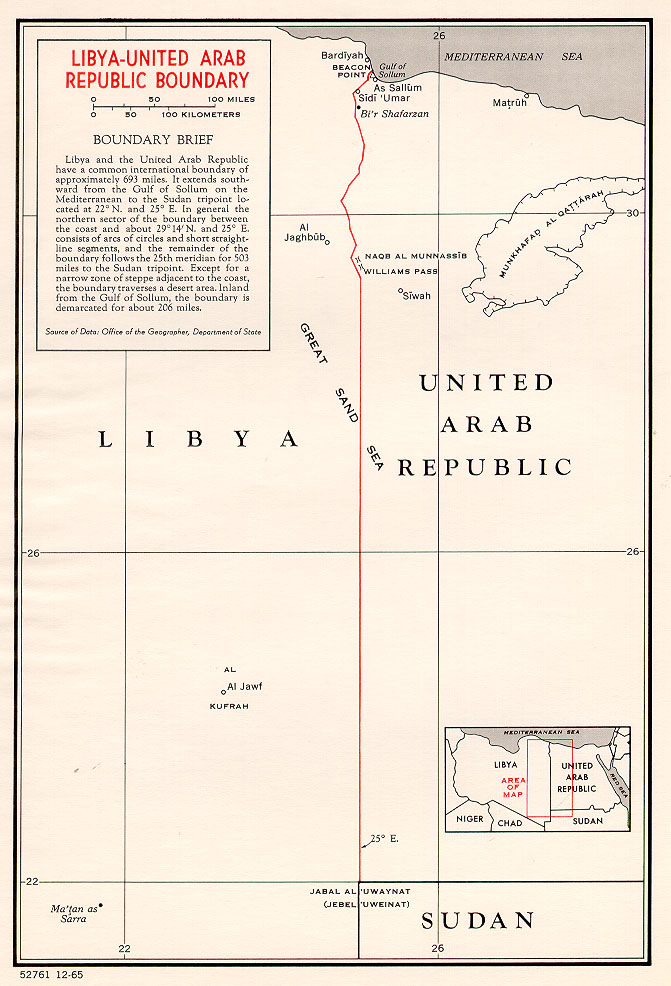
Map of the Egypt–Libya border

The Egypt–Libya border (Arabic: الحدود المصرية الليبية) is 1,115 km (693 mi) in length and runs from the Mediterranean Sea in the north to the tripoint with Sudan in the south.

== Description ==
The border starts in the north on the Mediterranean coast at the Gulf of Sallum. It then proceeds overland roughly southwards via a series of irregular lines that frequently veer south-west or south-east, before reaching the 25th meridian east. The border then follows this meridian south down to the Sudanese tripoint on Gabal El Uweinat, a mountain at the meeting point for Egypt, Libya and Sudan. Only the northern littoral section of the boundary contains any significant population centres, with the vast majority of the frontier running through remote areas of the Sahara Desert, including the Great Sand Sea and Libyan Desert.

== History ==
Egypt and Libya are both ancient civilizations, with a long history dating back thousands of years, with evidence of settlements and cultures in both regions predating recorded history; in fact, Ancient Egypt often interacted with various Libyan tribes throughout its history, with some Libyan dynasties even ruling parts of Egypt. While not as well documented as Egypt, Libya also has a long history, with evidence of ancient Libyan tribes like the Meshwesh and Tehenu who interacted with the Egyptians. In 30 BC, following the collapse of the Ptolemaic dynasty after the Battle of Alexandria as well as the War of Actium, Egypt had become a Roman province and the region of Cyrenaica in Libya was incorporated into the Roman Empire through various conquests led by Octavian, meaning both territories in North Africa were under Roman rule at its peak. The Cairo Campaign during the French Revolutionary Wars was led by the British to defeat Napoleon's French forces trapped in Egypt, featuring battles such as the Battle of the Nile and the Battle of the Pyramids in 1798. Egypt, though nominally part of the Ottoman Empire, had acquired a large degree of autonomy under Muhammad Ali following the Second Egyptian–Ottoman War of 1839–41. In 1882 the British occupied Egypt, effectively establishing a protectorate (formally declared only in 1914). The Ottoman Empire had also nominally ruled the coastal areas of what is today Libya since the 16th century, organised into the Vilayet of Tripolitania, with a vaguely defined border between the Vilayet and Egypt based on an 1841 Ottoman firman, which placed the border further to the east than its current position.

In September 1911, Italy invaded Tripolitania, and the Treaty of Ouchy was signed the following year by which the Ottomans formally ceded sovereignty of the area over to Italy during the Turco-Italian War. Italy organised the newly conquered regions into the colonies of Italian Cyrenaica and Italian Tripolitania and gradually began pushing further south; in 1934 they united the two territories into Italian Libya.

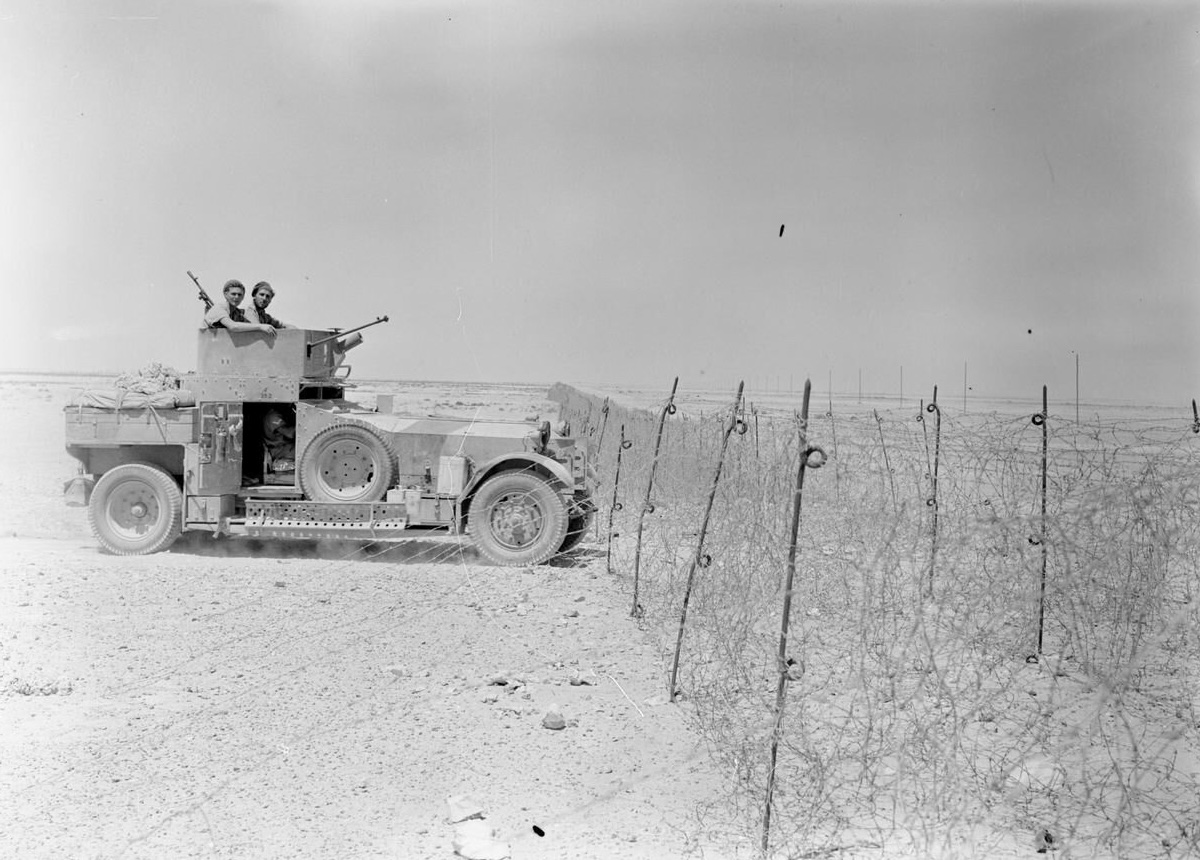
British troops at the Frontier Wire in 1940

Egypt achieved full independence in 1922. The border became a point of contention - for example, Egypt rejected a secret Anglo-Italian treaty of 1915 which had ceded the Al Jaghbub Oasis to Italian Libya. Egypt and Italy signed a treaty on 6 December 1925 which finalised the border at its current position (though Egypt did not formally ratify the treaty until 1932–3). The northern section of the border was delimited in more detail in 1926–7, with the boundary then being demarcated on the ground by a series of pillars. Further on-the-ground demarcation occurred in 1937–8, which resulted in some minor modifications. Meanwhile, Italy, in an attempt to control the Senussi rebels, had constructed a fence along much of the frontier in the 1920s-30s.

During the North African Campaign of the Second World War, Italy was defeated and its African colonies were occupied by the Allied powers, with Libya split into British and French zones of occupation. Libya was later granted full independence on 2 December 1951. During this period Egypt occasionally pressed for a modification of the border, stating that it should shift westwards to the 24th meridian east, with Al Jaghbub and Bardiyah to be included within Egypt. These claims appear to have been abandoned by the early 1950s.

Relations between the two states since then have largely been cordial, however tensions rose in the 1970s, due largely the more assertive pan-Arab and anti-Israel foreign policy of the Gaddafi government in Libya, which resulted in a brief war between the two countries along their northern border in 1977. Relations thereafter remained tense, but had largely normalised by the early 1990s. The border region has again become an area of concern as Egypt seeks to insulate itself from the effects of the ongoing civil war in Libya. Unlike the most powerful jihadist organizations of Ansar al-Sharia that became a militant allegiance that pledged, the Islamic State (ISIS or ISIL) arrived in Libya by September 2014 which was home to many foreign terrorist groups that became part of a global terrorist network until they were defeated in Sabha by fleeing the urban centers to an unknown location in the southern desert which will continue to operate and terrorist recruits from the Middle East and North Africa. Libya is now home to various foreign terrorist groups and fighters, including the extremists, which was housed at Al-Haruj Mountains that compared to the original "mujahideen" (who fought in the 1980s) at their hideout near the border with Pakistan.

== Settlements near the border ==
=== Egypt ===
- Sallum
- Sidi Omar
- Siwa Oasis

=== Libya ===
- Bardia
- Musaid
- Jaghbub

== See also ==
- Egypt–Libya relations
- Egypt–Sudan border
- Frontier Wire (Libya)
