= 2007 Royal Air Force Puma crash =

Helicopter crash in England

2007 Hudswell Grange Puma crash
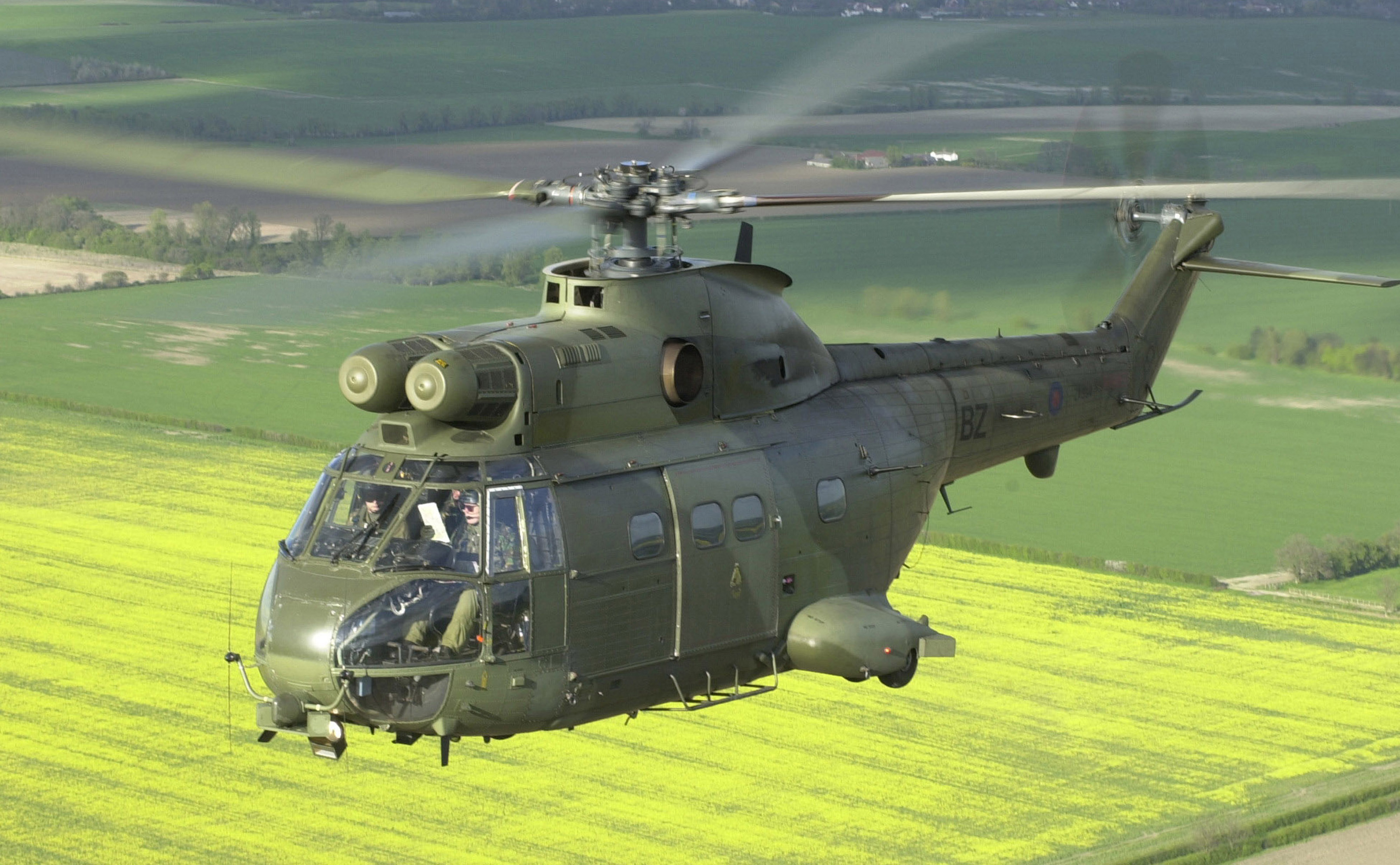
- ZA934; the airframe involved in the incident

Occurrence
- Date: 8 August 2007
- Summary: Helicopter crashed after being flown unprofessionally
- Site: Hudswell Grange, North Yorkshire, England; 54.3848°N 1.7853°W
- Total fatalities: 3
- Total injuries: 9

Aircraft
- Aircraft type: Aérospatiale SA 330 Puma
- Aircraft name: Puma
- Operator: Royal Air Force
- Registration: ZA934
- Occupants: 12
- Passengers: 9
- Crew: 3

On 8 August 2007, a Royal Air Force Puma helicopter of No. 33 Squadron, crashed in a wooded area near to Hudswell Grange, Catterick Garrison in North Yorkshire, England. The crash resulted in the deaths of three service personnel, and injuries, some serious, to the other nine service members aboard the helicopter. A coroner later attributed the crash to "inadequate administration, airmanship and discipline on the part of the Royal Air Force." The surviving pilot was court-martialled, but was given a suspended sentence, partly due to him being a paraplegic as a result of the crash.

== Aircraft ==
The airframe involved was a Puma HC1 helicopter number ZA934, which was delivered to the Royal Air Force in 1980 as a second batch of Puma helicopters with a standard crew of two pilots and one loadmaster. Records show that in 1993, the airframe was assigned to No. 33 Squadron, and it was still working for 33 Sqn at the time of the incident. It has, however, been used in the first Gulf War, and in 1998, was assigned to No. 230 Squadron at Aldergrove in the late 1990s. At the time of the incident, the aircraft was costed at £20 million (equivalent to £33,779,000 in 2025).

== Incident ==
The aircraft had been detached from RAF Benson (where No. 33 Squadron had been located at that time) to RAF Leeming in North Yorkshire for a training exercise in and around Catterick Garrison. Onboard were nine trainee soldiers who were only four weeks into their training at the Infantry Training Centre (ITC), which is based at Catterick Garrison. It crashed near to a farm at Hudswell Grange (SE139987) just before 21:00, and later the MoD stated that all personnel were in hospitals in either Newcastle or Middlesbrough, after a rescue effort involving helicopters from RAF Boulmer and RAF Leconfield, and an RAF Mountain Rescue team from RAF Leeming, in conjunction with civilian rescue services.

The aircraft was described as flying low and erratically, so much so, that another military crew in a Chinook helicopter radioed the crew and told them to "calm down". Witnesses to the helicopter's crash described it as pitching suddenly sideways, crashing into brush and woodland, and then breaking into three pieces. According to the Board of Inquiry (BoI), the helicopter continued on a forward momentum along the ground for 200 metres (660 ft) after its initial contact with the ground, and that one of the pilots and the loadmaster died at the scene, with one of the soldiers aboard dying 48 hours later in hospital. Both pilots had been strapped into their seats, but the seats had been thrown clear of the helicopter. Nine other service personnel aboard were taken to hospital.

== Aftermath ==
A Board of Inquiry (BoI) was set up following the crash, but after analysis of the cockpit-voice recorder (CVR), all data was passed to North Yorkshire Police so they could conduct an inquiry. A civilian coroner sitting at Harrogate delivered a report in October 2009; in it they described the crash as being caused by "inadequate administration, airmanship and discipline on the part of the Royal Air Force," and also that "...tactical manoeuvres, mostly below 30 metres, were excessive in number and irregularity … [the pilot] was attempting a flying manoeuvre which was beyond his capabilities, or those of the Puma, or both." It was later reported that the crew had engaged in dangerously low-flying tactics, including flying only 1.5 metres (5 ft) above a taxi to scare the driver, and had blared music over the loudspeaker and shouted out phrases from the film Top Gun. The coroner criticised the lack of paperwork which led to doubts about the qualifications of the pilots, and also that the co-pilot had been allowed to fly given that he had been involved in a near-miss with two other aircraft only days before the incident.

After coroner had delivered their report, a new service inquiry was initiated in December 2009. The service inquiry does not seek to apportion blame, and their findings determined that on the last training sortie of the day, the aircraft went into a dive that it could not recover from, after its tail rotor had come into contact with the ground. The service inquiry highlighted contributing factors as being " the crew’s combined relative inexperience, the lack of robust crew supervision; human factors; manning shortfalls; the high operational task load placed upon 33 Squadron; and the reduced opportunity, because of this task load, for supervised consolidation and reinforcement training." The officer commanding Joint Helicopter Command (which had No. 33 Squadron as a subordinate in its chain of command) also found that "the crew’s lack of adherence to checks; operating procedures; and their flight at below the authorised minimum level," contributed to the crash.

The co-pilot who survived was later tried in a military court, though he pleaded guilty, the court accepted that he was not flying the aircraft at the time, and suspended his sentence, in part due to him being a paraplegic as a result of the incident. However, even though he was not piloting the airframe, the court highlighted that he had a duty of care to the passengers and crew on the aircraft.
