= No. 33 Squadron RAF =

Flying squadron of the Royal Air Force

- Squadron badge
- Active: 1916–1918 (RFC); 1918–1919; 1929–1955; 1955–1957; 1957–1962; 1965–1970; 1971–2025
- Disbanded: October 2025
- Country: United Kingdom
- Branch: Royal Air Force
- Type: Flying squadron
- Motto: Loyalty

Commanders
- Notable commanders: Hector McGregor (Sep 1938 – Jan 1940); Marmaduke Pattle (Mar – Apr 1941)

Insignia
- Roundel
- Tail codes: SO (Sep 1938 – May 1939); TN (May 1939 – Sep 1939); NW (Sep 1939 – May 1941); 5R (Apr 1944 – Apr 1951); CA–CZ (Pumas)

No. 33 Squadron is a dormant squadron of the Royal Air Force. Prior to disbanding in 2025, it was based at RAF Benson, Oxfordshire, operating the Airbus Helicopters Puma HC2.

== History ==
=== First World War (1916–1918) ===
No. 33 Squadron of the Royal Flying Corps was formed from part of No. 12 Squadron at Filton airfield on 12 January 1916. For the remainder of the First World War the squadron was employed for home defence in Lincolnshire, guarding against German airship raids against northern England, being first equipped with the Royal Aircraft Factory BE.2, these being supplemented with the Royal Aircraft Factory FE.2. Its headquarters were at Gainsborough, with its flights based on three stations: RAF Scampton (A Flight), RAF Kirton in Lindsey (B Flight) and RAF Elsham Wolds (C Flight). The FE.2 was replaced by Bristol Fighters in June 1918, which were in turn replaced by night fighter the Avro 504 in August. The squadron did not destroy any enemy airships, despite a number of interceptions and was disbanded in June 1919.

=== Between the wars (1919–1938) ===
The squadron was reformed at RAF Netheravon, Wiltshire on 1 March 1929 as a bomber unit, equipped first with the Hawker Horsley. In February 1930, it became the first squadron to receive the new Hawker Hart, an aircraft faster than the RAF's fighter aircraft. In 1935, as part of Britain's response to the Second Italo-Abyssinian War, the unit moved to Egypt, taking part in air policing in Palestine.

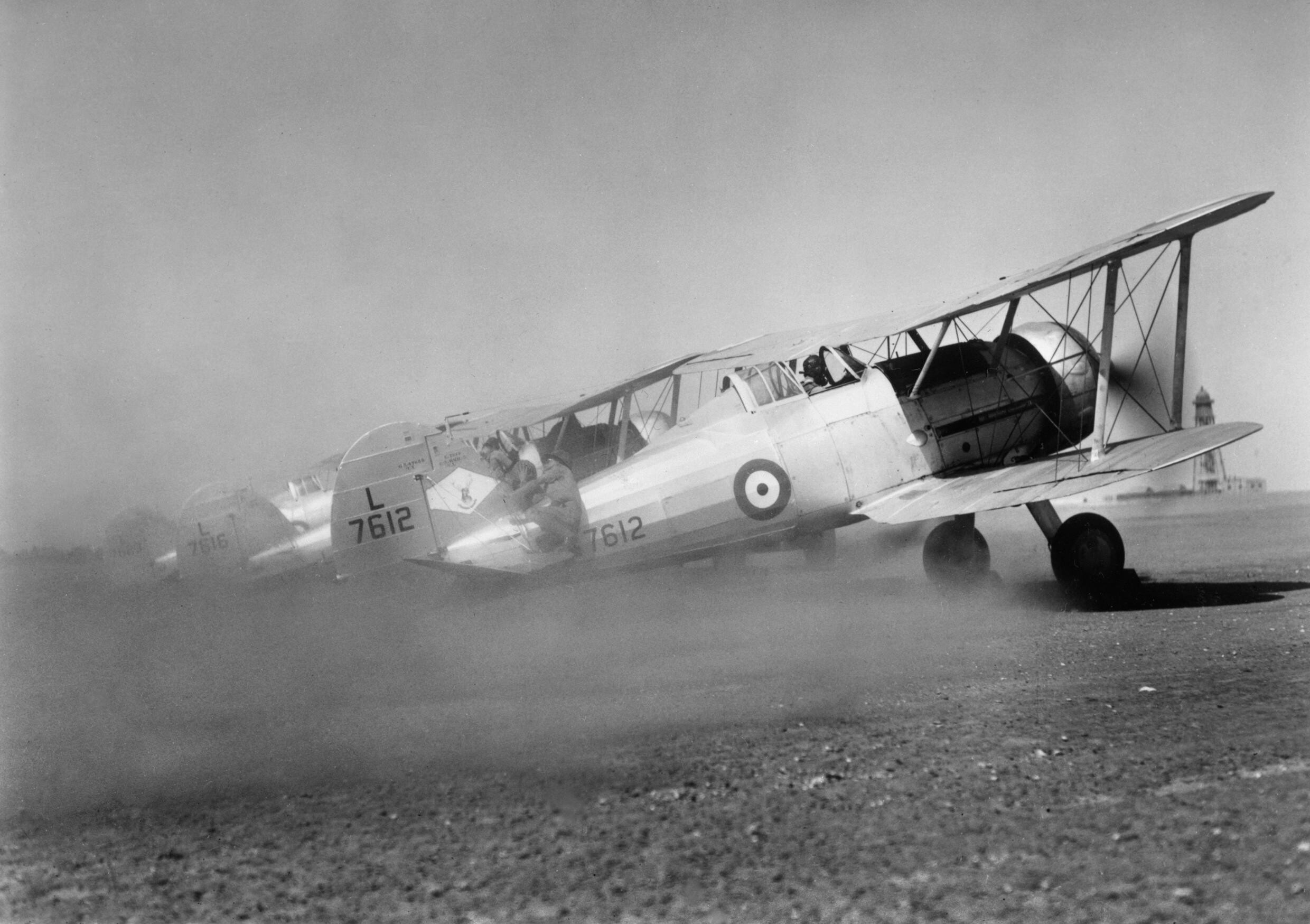
Gloster Gladiators of No. 33 Squadron, at RAF Ismailia, Egypt during the late 1930s

In February 1938, the squadron re-equipped with Gloster Gladiators, changing role to a fighter squadron, although at first it continued in support of British ground forces in Palestine.

=== Second World War (1939–1945) ===
With the exception of a time in Greece and Crete in 1941, No. 33 Squadron remained in the Middle East for most of the Second World War. Equipped initially with the Gloster Gladiators they had used in Palestine, the squadron claimed its first victories of the war on 14 June 1940, while supporting the British capture of Fort Capuzzo, when the squadron shot down an Italian Caproni Ca 310 and a Fiat CR.32. It suffered its first losses of the war five days later in a combat with Fiat CR.42 Falcos, with one Gladiator being shot down in exchange for two Fiats. The squadron re-equipped with the Hawker Hurricane in October 1940, allowing it to intercept the Italian SM.79 bombers, which were faster than the Gladiator.

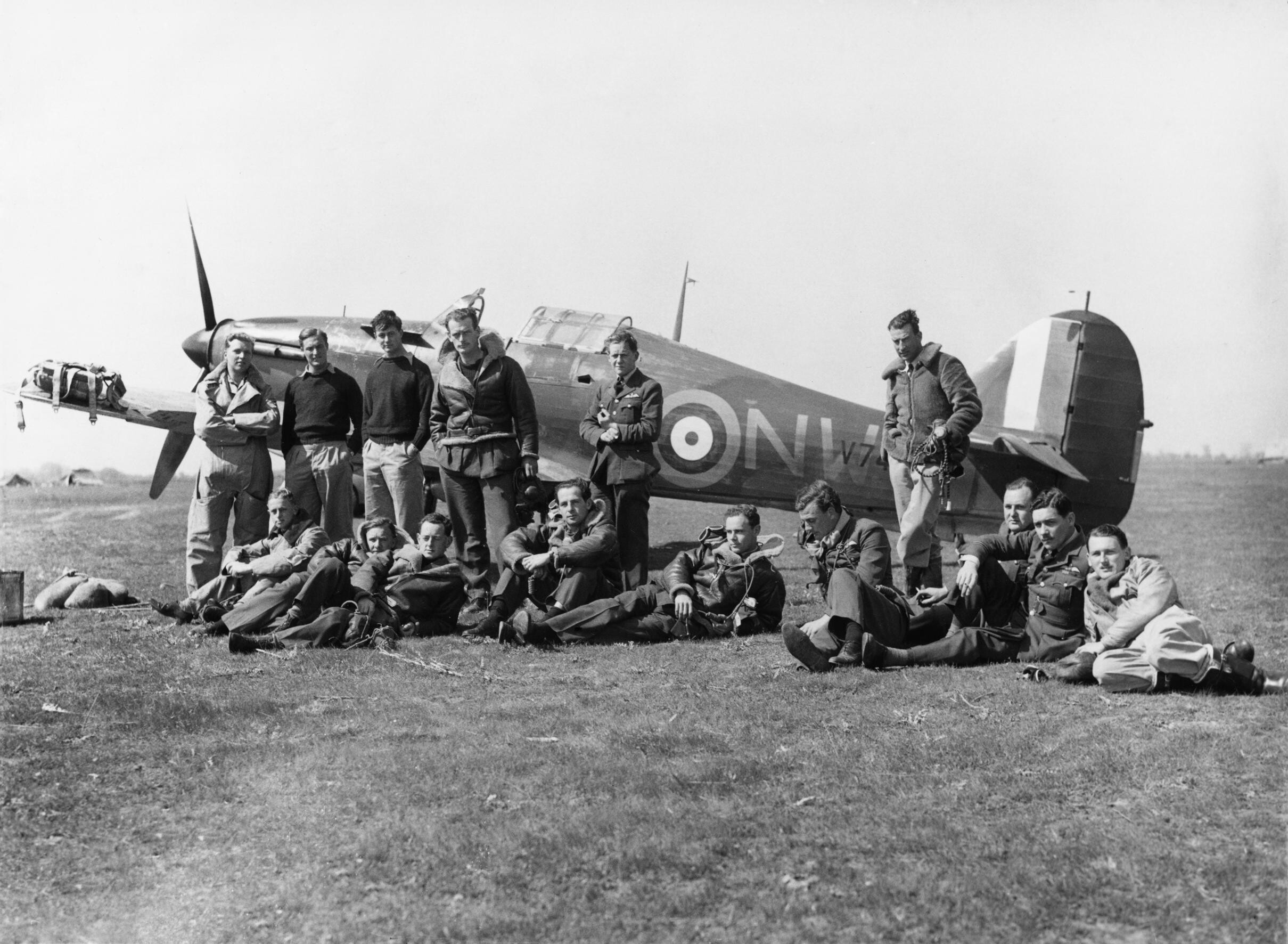
Pilots of No. 33 Squadron, at Larissa, Greece, with a Hawker Hurricane Mark I in the background, c. 1941

The squadron withdrawn from desert fighting in January 1941, in order to help resist the Italian invasion of Greece. From 12 March, Pat Pattle, the leading Commonwealth flying ace, was in command until he was killed in action on 20 April. The squadron was involved in heavy fighting following the German intervention, and had to be withdrawn to Crete on 27 April. Due to continuing heavy losses, the squadron had to amalgamate with No. 80 Squadron and the ground personnel fought hand-to-hand with German paratroopers to protect the airfield. The remnants of No. 33 Squadron retired to Egypt by the end of May after the Battle of Crete. The squadron returned to support the army in the Western Desert, including at the Battle of El Alamein, trading its Hurricanes for Supermarine Spitfires in December 1943.

Returning to the UK in 1944 for the Allied invasion of Normandy (Operation Overlord), the squadron flew the Spitfire IX F from RAF Lympne as part of Air Defence of Great Britain, though under the operational control of RAF Second Tactical Air Force (2nd TAF). It flew fighter support on D-Day (6 June 1944), then moved to France with 2nd TAF in October 1944, when it concentrated on ground-attack operations. It re-equipped with the Hawker Tempest in December, returning to action from Gilze-Rijen, Netherlands in February 1945, flying fighter sweeps in North West Europe. The squadron remained in Germany until 1949.

=== Post War operations (1946–1990s) ===
From 1949 to 1970, No. 33 Squadron spent much of its time in the Far East, based at Kai Tak, Hong Kong, until sent to Kuala Lumpur in Malaya, flying their Tempests in ground attack missions against Communist guerrillas during the Malayan Emergency. It re-equipped with twin-engined de Havilland Hornets in 1951, disbanding in March 1955, having flown 6,150 sorties during its stay in Malaya.

On 15 December 1955, it reformed as a night fighter squadron flying the de Havilland Venom NF.2 from RAF Driffield, Yorkshire. It was disbanded on 3 June 1957 and reformed on 1 October, by renumbering No. 264 Squadron, another night fighter squadron operating the Gloster Meteor NF.14 from RAF Leeming, also in Yorkshire. It re-equipped with Gloster Javelins in April 1958, at RAF Middleton St George in County Durham, being disbanded again on 18 November 1962. A number of types were operated during several disbandments and reformations throughout the late 1950s and early 1960s.

In April 1965, No. 33 Squadron became a Bloodhound surface-to-air missile unit based at Butterworth in Malaya, being disbanded on 30 January 1970.

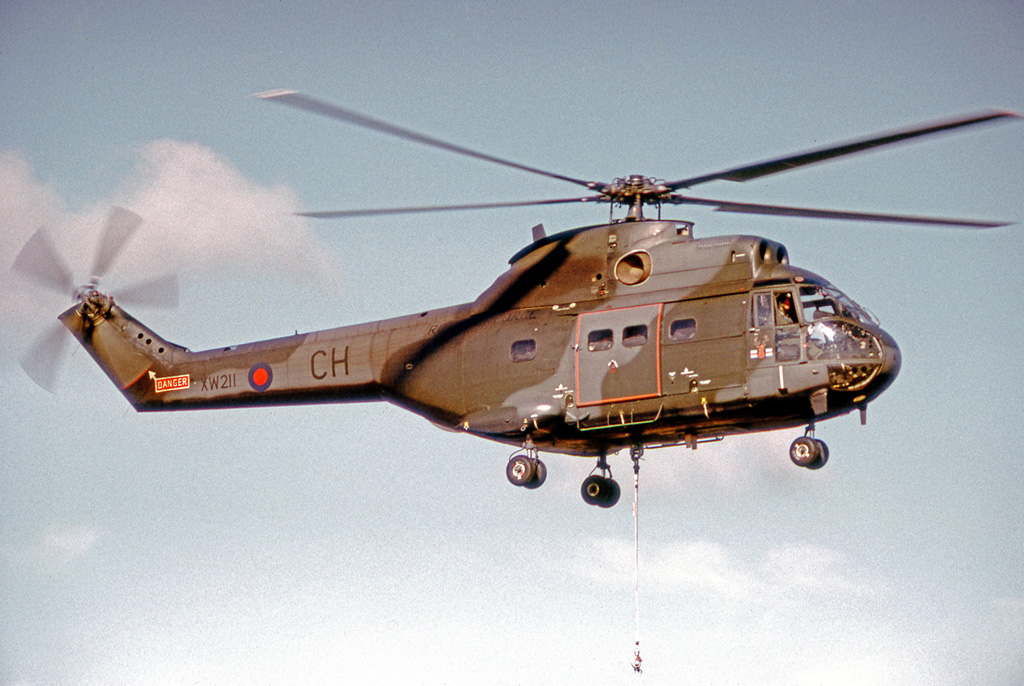
A Westland Puma HC1 of No. 33 Squadron in 1972

The squadron reformed on 14 June 1971 at RAF Odiham, Hampshire as the RAF's first Westland Puma squadron. It took part in the Gulf War of 1991 and the Kosovo War in the late 1990s. On 13 June 1997, the squadron moved from Odiham to Benson.

=== 21st century (2000–2025) ===
The squadron participated in relief operations during the flooding in Mozambique in 2000 and NATO operations in Bosnia in the early 2000s.

On 8 August 2007, the crash of No. 33 Squadron Puma HC1 ZA934 left three personnel dead out of twelve on board in Catterick Garrison. At the inquest, the coroner described No. 33 Squadron as "a sloppy outfit", that allowed an unqualified crew to operate the helicopter. A recording played at the inquest revealed pilot Dave Sale remarking, "let's scare the shit out of this taxi", before apparently flying 5 feet (1.5 m) above a taxi, an incident that happened two hours prior to the crash, during the same flight. A court-martial of the co-pilot stated that "the officers on this board are shocked at the lack of professional standards displayed by those responsible for the aircraft."

The squadron was deployed to Iraq as part of Operation Telic in 2009.

The Puma HC1 was withdrawn from service and was replaced by the Puma HC2 in December 2012.

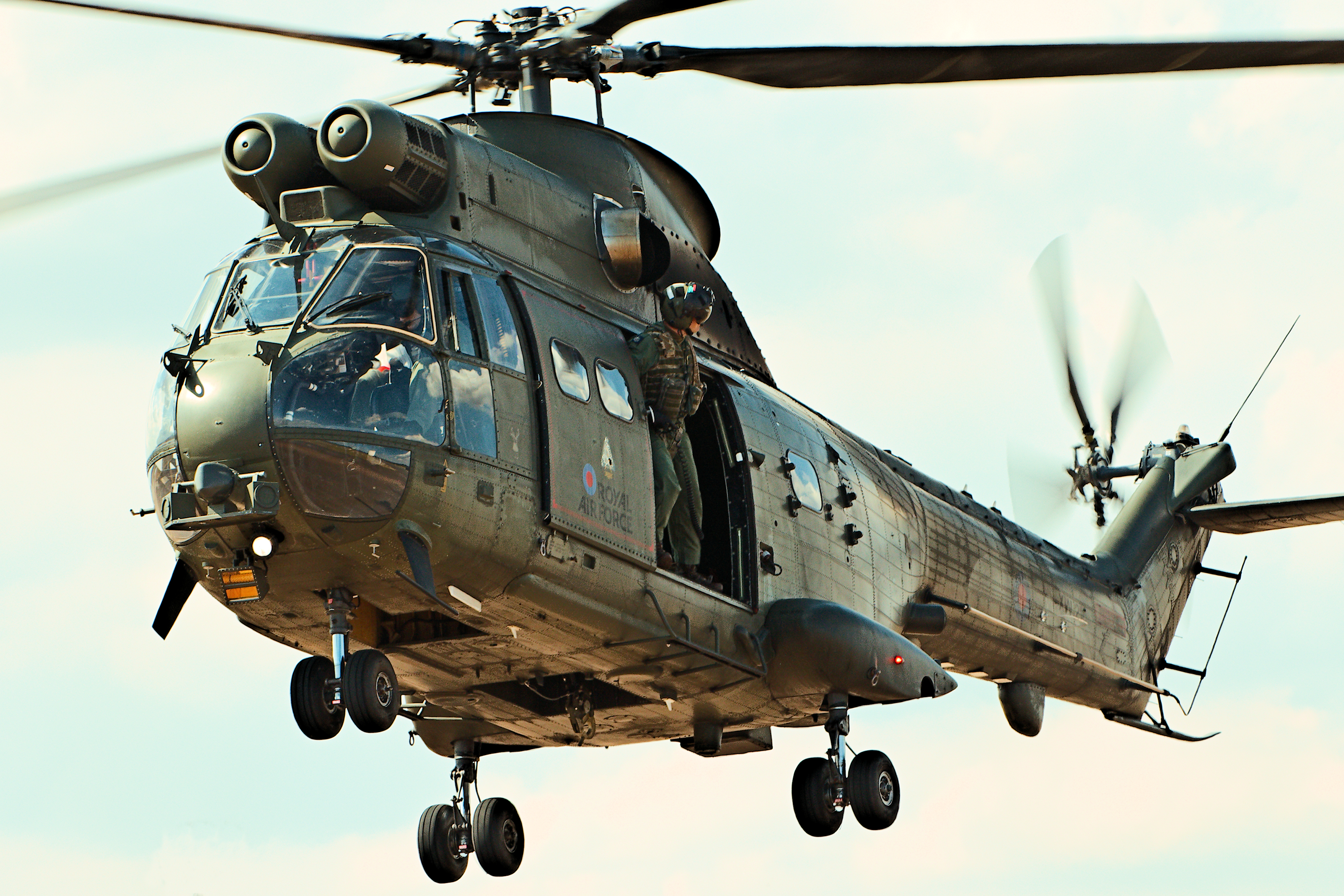
A Westland Puma HC2 of No. 33 Squadron in 2018

On 11 October 2015, one member of the squadron was killed in an accident in Kabul, Afghanistan, whilst landing at the NATO Training and Support Mission Headquarters. A Ministry of Defence spokesman said the crash was "an accident and not the result of insurgent activity". The pilot was named a day later, and was repatriated back to the UK on 20 October. The Flight Lieutenant's commanding officer said "He died tragically doing a job he loved and flying an aircraft he had personally invested so much time developing. A loving husband, his loyalty and devotion to his friends, work colleagues and the job was unequalled and his memory and contribution will live on." A post mortem found he died of multiple injuries at an inquest. The inquest was adjourned indefinitely until the conclusion of separate inquiries being undertaken by the Ministry of Defence were completed.

The Puma HC2 was retired from service in March 2025. The squadron disbanded in October 2025, with its standard being lodged at RAF Cranwell so that it may be reclaimed if the squadron is reformed in future.

== Aircraft operated ==
- Royal Aircraft Factory B.E.2 (January 1916–November 1916)
- Royal Aircraft Factory F.E.2 (November 1916–June 1918)
- Bristol F.2 Fighter (June 1918–August 1918)
- Avro 504 (August 1918–June 1919)
- Hawker Horsley (March 1929–February 1930)
- Hawker Hart (February 1930–February 1938)
- Gloster Gladiator (February 1938–October 1940)
- Hawker Hurricane (September 1940–December 1943)
- Supermarine Spitfire (February 1943–December 1944)
- Hawker Tempest Mk. V (December 1944–November 1945)
- Supermarine Spitfire (November 1945 – 1946)
- Hawker Tempest F.2 (1946–1951)
- de Havilland Hornet (1951–March 1955)
- de Havilland Venom NF.2 (October 1955–June 1957)
- Gloster Meteor NF.14 (October 1955–January 1957)
- Gloster Javelin FAW.7 (July 1958–November 1962)
- Bristol Bloodhound (March 1965–January 1970)
- Westland Puma HC1 (June 1971–December 2012)
- Airbus Helicopters Puma HC.2 (September 2012–March 2025)

== Heritage ==
=== Badge and motto ===
The squadron's badge features a hart's head affrontée, couped at the neck, developed from an unofficial emblem produced in the early 1930s when the squadron introduced the famous Hawker Hart into service. It was approved by King Edward VIII in May 1936.

The squadron's motto is Loyalty.

=== Memorial ===
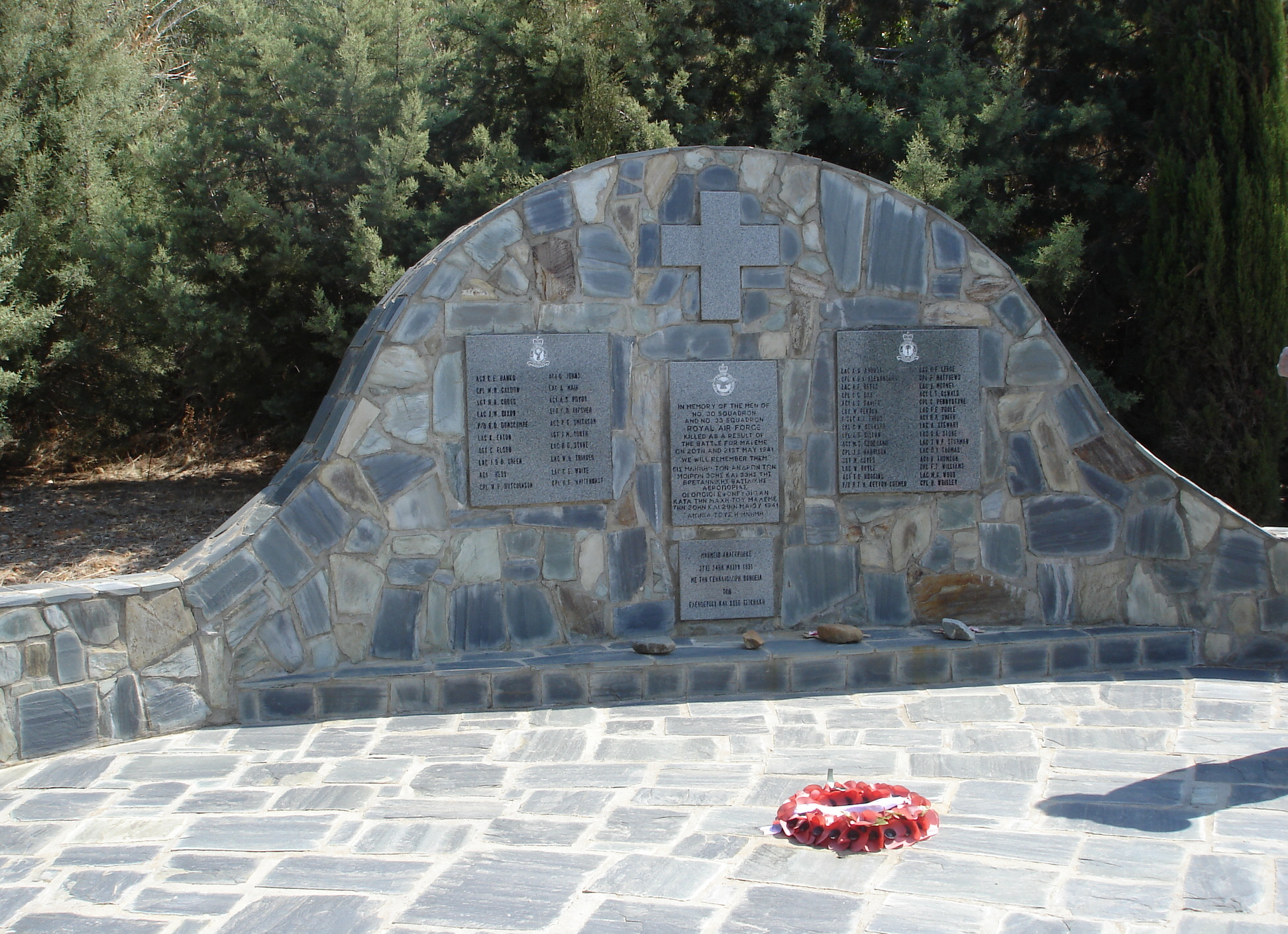
Memorial to members of 30 and 33 Squadrons RAF killed in battle of Crete

A memorial to the airmen of No. 33 Squadron and No. 30 Squadron who died during the Battle of Crete in 1941 is located between Maleme and Tavronitis (35.525363°N 23.828619°E) on the Greek island of Crete. It overlooks the Iron Bridge across the River Tavronitis and the Maleme Airport runway.

== Battle honours ==
No. 33 Squadron has received the following battle honours. Those marked with an asterisk (*) may be emblazoned on the squadron standard.

- Home Defence (1916–1918)*
- Palestine (1936–1939)
- Egypt and Libya (1940–1943)*
- Greece (1941)*
- El Alamein*
- France and Germany (1944–1945)*
- Normandy (1944)*
- Walcheren*
- Rhine*
- Gulf (1991)*
- Iraq (2003–2011)*

== See also ==
- List of RAF squadrons
