= 1977 expulsion of Egyptians from Libya =

- Date: 1 July 1977
- Location: Libya
- Motive: To expel all Egyptians living in Libya
- Perpetrator: (Libya) Libyan Arab Republic: Revolutionary Command Council
- Organized by: Muammar Gaddafi
- Outcome: 225,000 Egyptians expelled from Libya

The 1977 expulsion of Egyptians from Libya occurred during heightened tensions between the two countries, when the Libyan leader Muammar Gaddafi accused Egypt of provoking a war to seize Libyan oil fields. With this order, almost all Egyptians living in Libya were required to leave the country by 1 July 1977 or face arrest.

== Background ==
In the 1970s, Gaddafi pursued Arab unity, resulting in the creation of the Federation of Arab Republics in 1972 with Egypt and Syria. However, the FAR only achieved symbolic gestures of unity, despite initial ambitions for military consolidation.

Gaddafi pushed for unity with Egypt, but Anwar Sadat's interest waned, Sadat developed personal animosity towards Gaddafi. Gaddafi aimed to eliminate Israel, hoping to leverage Libya's finances and Egypt's strength in a potential conflict. However, The Yom Kippur War in 1973, initiated by Egypt and Syria without Libya's consultation, proved a turning point, Sadat's decision to negotiate and ratify a ceasefire agreement with Israel for the return of the Sinai Peninsula angered Gaddafi, Gaddafi saw the war objectives and the resistance movement as too limited, describing the resistance movement as "Non-existent" and that it has been finished off by the Arabs in collaboration with Israel, Meanwhile, Sadat, also criticized and accused Gaddafi for subversive activities in Egypt, leading to strained relations. Gaddafi then began to regularly expel migrant workers to put Sadat under pressure.

== Expulsion ==
In 1977, tensions peaked, and as a result, Gaddafi forcefully expelled over 200,000 Egyptians from Libya, accusing Egypt of attempting to seize Libyan oil fields. They were given a deadline of 1 July 1977 to choose whether to leave or face arrest.

== Aftermath ==
Gaddafi then initiated a full-scale war against Egypt, resulting in the capture and of Sallum. Sadat launched a counter-offensive, regained lost territory and pushed into Libya. The conflict ultimately reached a stalemate, with a ceasefire agreement that restored the pre-war borders.
