= Sidi Omar =

Ancient Tomb in Egypt

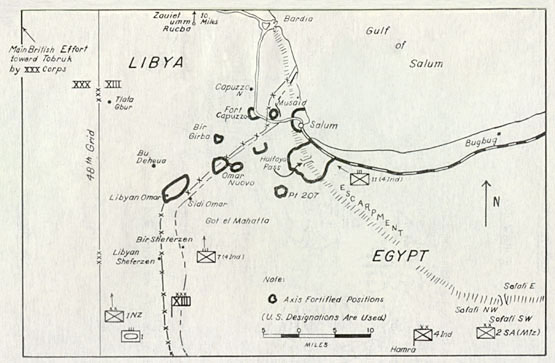
Disposition of British forces during Operation Crusader with the fortifications of Sidi Omar (1941)

Sidi Omar (Arabic: سيدي عمر, romanized: Sayyidī ʿUmar) is an ancient Senussi tomb located in the Egyptian desert in the Matrouh Governorate. It serves as the demarcation of the border between Libya and Egypt since the Italo-Egyptian Treaty of Jaghbub (1925).

During the colonial period of Italian Libya, a series of defensive positions were built on the Italian side of the Frontier Wire (Libya) to support Fort Capuzzo, also called Sidi Omar (by the British Libyan Sidi Omar) and Sidi Omar Nuovo.

During the Second World War, the area of Sidi Omar played a significant role in Operation Compass, Operation Battleaxe and Operation Crusader.
