= Siege of Cairo =

Siege of Cairo may refer to:

- Siege of Cairo (1168) – Crusaders fail to capture the city from the Fatimids
- Siege of Cairo (1800) – French capture the city from the Ottomans
- Siege of Cairo (1801) – an Anglo-Ottoman force captures the city from the French

== See also ==
- Capture of Cairo
