= Egyptian–Libyan War =

Four-day border war in July 1977

- Part of the Arab Cold War
- Map of Libya and Egypt in 1977
Date	21–24 July 1977
Location	Egyptian–Libyan border
Result	Ceasefire

Belligerents
Egypt	Libya

Commanders and leaders
Anwar Sadat; Adil Nassr	Muammar Gaddafi; Mahdi Saleh al-Firjani

Strength
40,000+ troops	c. 5,000 troops

Casualties and losses
c. 100 casualties unknown captured c. 4 aircraft destroyed	400 casualties 12 captured 30 tanks destroyed 40 armored carriers destroyed aircraft losses disputed

The Egyptian–Libyan War, also known as the Four Day War (Arabic: حرب الأيام الأربعة), was a short border war fought between Libya and Egypt that lasted from 21 to 24 July 1977. The conflict stemmed from a deterioration in relations that had occurred between the two states after Egyptian President Anwar Sadat had rebuffed Libyan leader Muammar Gaddafi's entreaties to unify their countries and had started to pursue peace negotiations with Israel in the aftermath of the Yom Kippur War in 1973. Soon thereafter, Libya began sponsoring dissidents and assassination plots to undermine Sadat, in which Egypt responded in kind to weaken Gaddafi. In early 1976, Gaddafi dispatched troops to the Egyptian frontier where they began clashing with border guards. Sadat responded by moving many troops to the area, while the Egyptian General Staff drew up plans for an invasion to depose Gaddafi.

Clashes along the border intensified in July 1977. On 21 July, a Libyan tank battalion raided the Egyptian town of Sallum. The Egyptian forces ambushed it and subsequently launched a large counter-attack, conducting airstrikes against Gamal Abdel Nasser Airbase and sending a mechanised force 24 kilometres (15 mi) into Libyan territory before withdrawing. Over the next two days, heavy artillery fire was exchanged across the border, while Egyptian jets and commandos raided Libyan locales. On 24 July, the Egyptians launched a larger raid against Nasser Airbase and struck Libyan supply depots. Under significant pressure from the United States to end the attacks, and attempts from President of Algeria Houari Boumediène and Palestine Liberation Organisation leader Yasser Arafat to mediate a solution, Sadat suddenly declared a ceasefire. Sporadic fighting occurred over the next few days as Egyptian troops withdrew across the border. Relations between the two countries remained tense, and, though a formal agreement was never reached, both upheld a truce and gradually withdrew their forces from the border. Gaddafi softened his rhetoric against Egypt in the following years but actively rallied other Arab states to isolate the country.

== Background ==
In the 1970s Libya, led by Muammar Gaddafi, began a determined foreign policy of promoting Arab unity. He consulted Egyptian and Syrian leaders on taking steps towards that goal. When Egyptian President Gamal Abdel Nasser, a leading proponent of Arab nationalism, died in September 1970, his successor, Anwar Sadat, took his place in the discussions. The negotiations culminated in the creation of the Federation of Arab Republics (FAR) in 1972, consisting of Libya, Egypt, and Syria. Though the FAR was instituted with broad goals for the consolidation of each country's militaries, laws, and foreign policies, only symbolic gestures of unity were ever adopted, such as the establishment of a common national flag. In the following months, Gaddafi aggressively campaigned for immediate unity with Egypt, while Sadat's interest in unification steadily declined. Sadat also took a personal dislike to Gaddafi, finding him an annoying and unfit leader.

One of Gaddafi's major foreign policy goals, shared by many in the Arab world, was the elimination of Israel. He hoped that the combined power of Libya's finances, backed by a profitable oil-based economy, and Egypt's large population and military strength, could be used to destroy Israel. On 6 October 1973, Egypt and Syria, without consulting Libya, launched a co-ordinated attack on Israel, initiating the Yom Kippur War. Though an Israeli counter-attack eliminated Egyptian territorial gains in the early stages of the war, Sadat agreed to open negotiations with Israel, seeking the return of the Sinai Peninsula to Egypt in exchange for a guarantee to not engage in further attacks on the country. Gaddafi was angered by the war's limited objectives and the ceasefire, and accused Sadat of cowardice, undermining the FAR, and betraying the Arab cause. Sadat responded by revealing he had intervened earlier that year to prevent Libya from sinking a civilian passenger ship carrying Jewish tourists in the Mediterranean Sea. Thereafter, Egyptian–Libyan relations were marked by frequent accusations against each country's leaders, and further discussions regarding the pursuit of unity were abandoned.

== Prelude ==
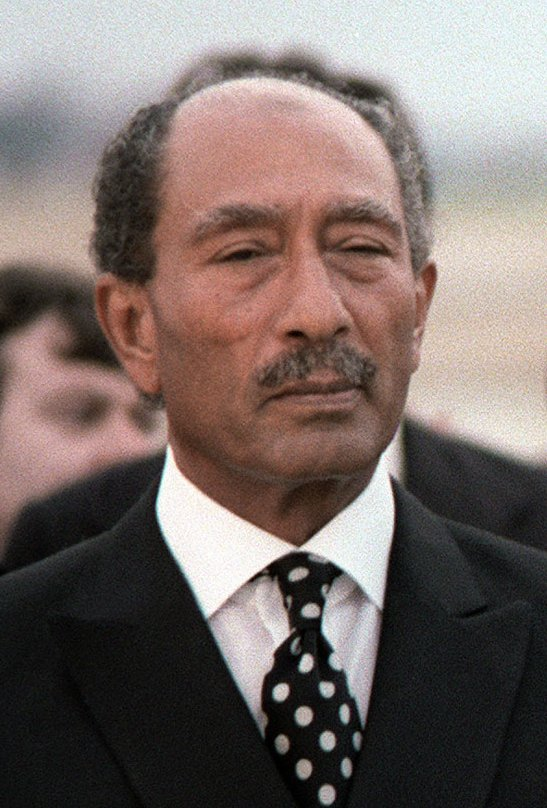
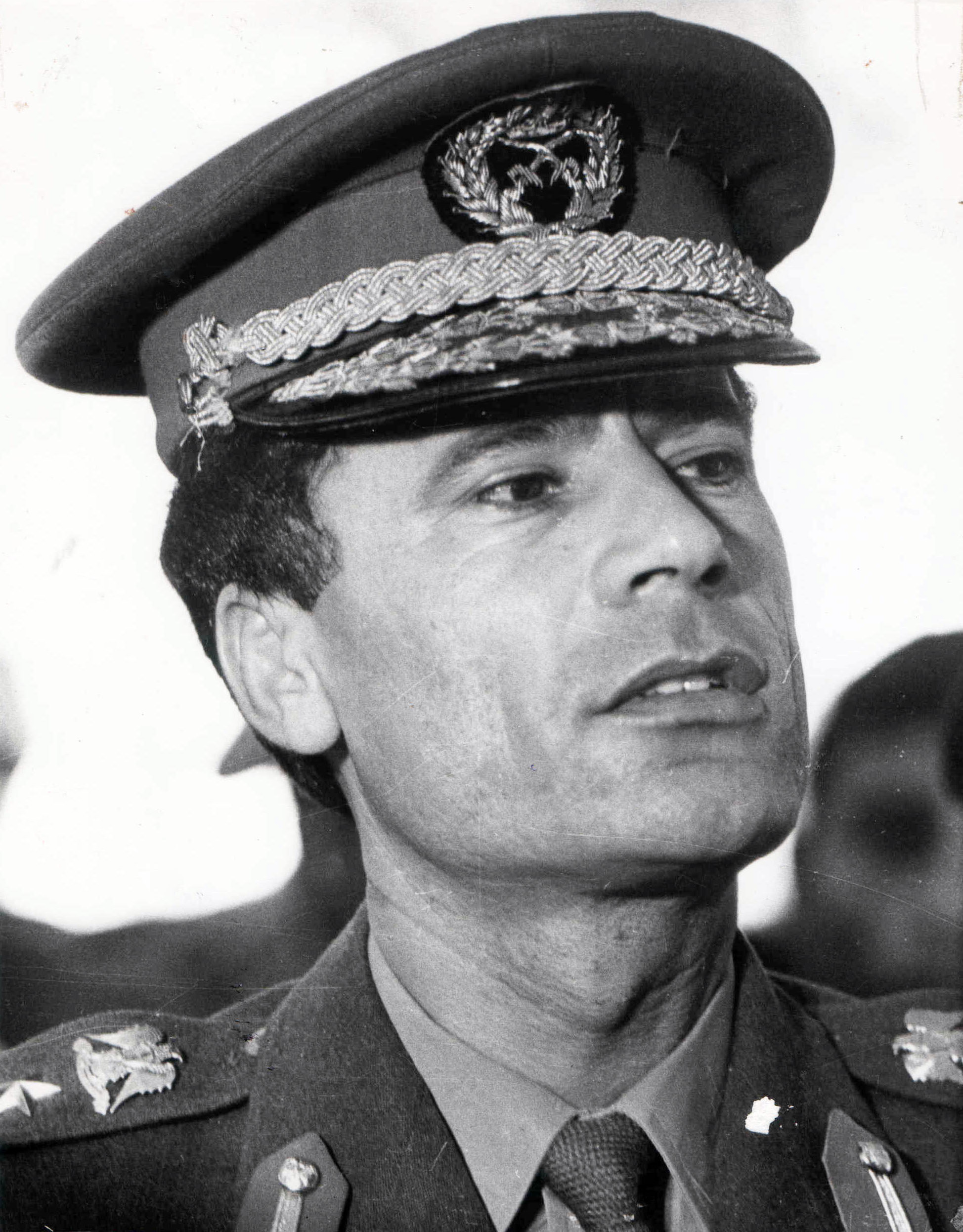
Differences between Egyptian President Anwar Sadat (left) and Libyan leader Muammar Gaddafi (right) over the unification of their countries and foreign policy concerning Israel led to a deterioration of relations between Egypt and Libya in the 1970s.

Unnerved by Sadat's peace policy, Gaddafi sought to increase Libya's role in Middle Eastern affairs. Bolstered by strong oil revenues, he began acquiring a significant amount of weapons from the Soviet Union. He also sponsored Egyptian dissidents such as the Muslim Brotherhood, armed Egyptian insurgents, and made plans to assassinate Sadat. The Egyptian President responded by supporting subversion in Libya—including the possible extensions of encouragement to plots to assassinate Gaddafi—and backing anti-Libyan groups in neighbouring Chad. In February 1974, Sadat told United States Secretary of State Henry Kissinger to encourage Israel to refrain from attacking Egypt in the event it went to war with Libya. In early 1976, Gaddafi deployed Libyan troops along the Egyptian border, where they began clashing with Egyptian border guards. In the summer, Sadat decided to take military action against Libya's provocations, moving two mechanised divisions—totaling 25,000–35,000 troops—to the border and transferring 80 combat aircraft to Marsa Matruh Airbase, Egypt's westernmost airfield. Alarmed by this sudden escalation, Gaddafi dispatched an additional 3,000–5,000 troops and 150 tanks to the border. On 22 July, Gaddafi ordered Egypt to close its consulate in Benghazi. For a time being, the situation remained tense as it appeared Egypt would invade Libya, but after several weeks of no major action by the Egyptians, it appeared to the Libyans that there would be no attack.

Most observers at the time argued that Sadat did not order an invasion because it would stress Egypt's faltering economy and distance it from the Soviet Union and the Arab states in the Persian Gulf, which were already displeased with his policy towards Israel and overtures to the United States. Diplomatic sources have posited that Sadat was determined to occupy the Libyan capital, Tripoli, and depose Gaddafi. Egyptian sources also reported that Sadat wished to demonstrate to the Soviet Union that Egypt was stronger than Libya, and that its government should not abandon good relations with Egypt in favour of Libya. American intelligence analyst Kenneth M. Pollack concluded that the reason Egypt did not attack Libya at the time was because its army was unprepared; Egyptian forces had never rehearsed an invasion of Libya, and lacked the infrastructure and logistics in the Western Desert to support such an operation. Nevertheless, the Egyptian General Staff made plans for an attack. Egyptian Minister of War Mohamed Abdel Ghani el-Gamasy stated that the Egyptian Army was preparing for conflict in the west, while Egyptian media declared that Gaddafi was planning to annex the Western Desert with aid from Cuba.

Gaddafi increased his political pressure on Egypt, while the Egyptians continued to stockpile supplies and concentrate forces along the border. In May 1977, the Soviets told Libya and other Arab countries that they had evidence that Egypt was planning to launch an invasion. The Libyans ignored the warning and left most of their units at low levels of readiness, despite continuing to engage in border clashes with Egyptian forces. By the early summer, Egypt had completed its preparations for war. The Egyptian Air Force transferred Su-20 and Su-7 fighter-bombers of the No. 55 Squadron and Mirage 5 strike aircraft of the No. 69 Squadron to Marsa Matruh Airbase and nearby installations in anticipation of conflict. Significant clashes occurred on 12 and 16 July, and on 19 July, Libyan forces engaged in a drawn-out firefight with the Egyptians while conducting a raid. The Egyptian government reported that nine of its soldiers were killed. Gaddafi organised a group of civilians to march from Libya to Cairo, the Egyptian capital, to protest Sadat's policy towards Israel in the hopes that they would be well received by the population. After Egyptian border guards halted the demonstration at the frontier, Gaddafi ordered his forces to raid the Egyptian town of Sallum.

== Opposing forces ==
By early July 1977, the two Egyptian Army divisions deployed to the border had been raised to full strength and were dug in. They were bolstered by several commando battalions and support units, while a third division stationed near Cairo and other commandos were ready to relocate on short notice. A total of over 40,000 troops were deployed to the border during the war. Having participated in the Yom Kippur War, Egyptian forces also had a fair amount of combat experience, maintained a high level of professionalism, and were led by a skilled group of generals. However, morale among the soldiers was mixed, as some had reservations about fighting a fellow Arab nation over what seemed to be a dispute related to peace with Israel, a former enemy. (Note: According to Egyptian Air Force Major Ahmed Abbas, "[A]ny problems with morale were solved as soon as we had been informed that Libyans were violating our airspace and the territorial integrity of our country, killing a number of our border guards.") The Egyptian forces also struggled with a lack of skilled personnel to maintain their equipment.

Libyan forces were largely at a disadvantage. The entire Libyan Army consisted of only 32,000 troops and, of these, only about 5,000 were assembled in three brigade-sized formations to combat the Egyptians along the border. Libya also had a dearth of skilled personnel; in 1977, the military only had about 200–300 trained tank crews and at most 150 qualified pilots. Maintenance of equipment was minimal and units typically managed only a 50 percent operational readiness level or less. The Libyan Arab Republic Air Force (LARAF), led by Colonel Mahdi Saleh al-Firjani, possessed over 100 Mirages and MiG-23 fighter aircraft each, but technical problems grounded the latter. Gaddafi had also politicised the army by frequently shuffling commands and making appointments based on personal loyalty and thus the military lacked professionalism. Nevertheless, Libyan morale was high, as they believed they were facing an enemy that had betrayed the Arab world by seeking peace with Israel. (Note: According to Libyan pilot Hazem al-Bajigni, Colonel Firjani overstated the effectiveness of his force to the Libyan War Council, boasting that it could clear a corridor to Cairo in a matter of days. Bajigni also stated that the Egyptians, due to past military co-operation with the Libyans, were well-informed of their military capabilities.)

== Course of the war ==
On 21 July 1977, the Libyan 9th Tank Battalion carried out a raid on Sallum. The unit was ambushed in the town and subjected to a well-planned counter-attack by at least one Egyptian mechanised division, which inflicted 50 percent casualties on the 9th Tank Battalion before it retreated. The Libyan Army requested air support, and a few Mirages of the LARAF's No. 1002 Squadron bombed Sallum and nearby settlements, causing minimal damage. The Egyptians claimed to have shot down two of them with anti-aircraft fire, reportedly destroying one with SA-7 man-portable air-defence systems. Several hours later, the Egyptians initiated a large counter-offensive. Four Egyptian Mirages and eight Su-7s, led by Colonel Adil Nassr and covered by four MiG-21 fighters, flew out of Marsa Matruh, Egypt, and raided the Gamal Abdel Nasser Airbase at Al Adm, which served as the primary interceptor airbase in eastern Libya. The Libyans were caught off guard, and many of their Mirages and MiGs were stationary and exposed at the base. Western sources reported that the air raid had little effect. According to Pollack, the Egyptian airstrikes caused little damage to aircraft, though they struck a few radars. The Egyptians claimed that they had damaged seven planes. Military historians Tom Cooper and Albert Grandolini wrote that Libyan pilots reported the raid to be "highly effective". One Egyptian Su-7 was shot down and its pilot was captured. He was later presented as a captive on television. Other Egyptian jets attacked radar stations at Bardia and Jaghbub.

A substantial Egyptian mechanised force—possibly as large as two divisions—advanced into Libya along the coast towards the town of Musaid. Aside from a few tank clashes, the Libyans retreated in face of the incursion. After advancing 24 kilometres (15 mi) into Libya, the Egyptians withdrew over the border. The Libyans lost a total of 60 tanks and armoured personnel carriers in the fighting.

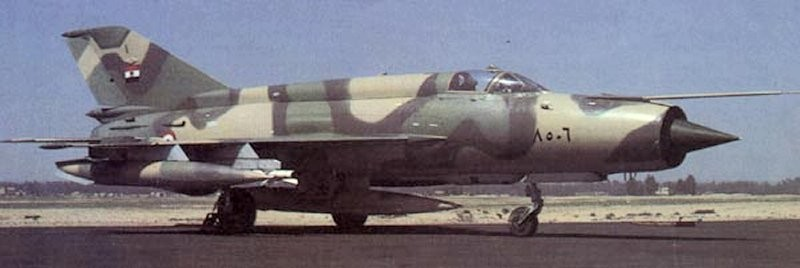
The Egyptians fielded MiG-21s (example pictured) against Gamal Abdel Nasser Airbase during the war.

Over the next two days, the Libyans and the Egyptians exchanged heavy artillery fire over the border to minimal effect. Egyptian forces rallied in Sallum, and were subject to 16 low-level raids from the LARAF on the morning of 22 July. The Egyptians claimed to have shot down two fighter jets, though the Libyans attributed these losses to accidents, claiming one of their aircraft crashed while on a reconnaissance mission and that another was destroyed by their own anti-aircraft fire. During this time the Egyptian Air Force raided several Libyan towns and military installations, including the Kufra Airbase. The Egyptians also dispatched three squadrons of MiGs and Su-20s to attack Nasser Airbase. The Libyan aircraft were still left exposed at the base, but the Egyptians only caused light damage to them, as well as some radars and buildings. Nevertheless, the LARAF ceased to operate from the installation for the rest of the day. Egyptian jets also displayed their air superiority by making low passes over Libyan villages. Though the planes did not open fire, this reportedly instigated the flight of thousands of civilians towards Benghazi. With Nasser Airbase temporarily inoperative, 12 Egyptian commando battalions launched helicopter-borne attacks against Libyan radars, military installations, and Egyptian anti-Sadat insurgent camps located along the border as well as in the Kufrah Oasis, Al Jaghbub Oasis, Al Adm, and Tobruk. On the morning of 23 July, the LARAF launched attacks against Egypt, its Mirages flying low over the Mediterranean Sea before turning south to assault Marsa Matruh Airbase and other installations. They were accompanied by Mil Mi-8 helicopters, which were equipped for electronic warfare. Though the helicopters disrupted the Egyptian Air Defence Command's communications, Egyptian MiG-21s conducted near-constant patrols to mitigate the effectiveness of the LARAF. Egypt claimed that it destroyed four Mirages.

On 24 July, Libya mobilised its reserves. Meanwhile, the Egyptians initiated a large assault on Nasser Airbase, where the Libyans had still not moved their aircraft into cover. The Egyptian jets attacked in tandem with commandos in helicopters. They managed to demolish several early-warning radar systems, damage some surface-to-air missile sites, crater the airstrip, and destroy a few armoured vehicles and 6–12 Mirages. Libyan anti-aircraft fire shot down two Su-20s. Commando attacks on Libyan logistics depots at Al Adm and Jaghbub caused significant damage, though a raid by Egyptian jets on Kufra Airbase had little effect. Late in the day, while fighting was still going on in Jaghbub, Libya, Sadat declared a ceasefire. Minor actions occurred over the next two days while Egyptian forces withdrew to their country. Over the course of the war the Libyans lost 30 tanks, 40 armoured personnel carriers, as well as 400 casualties. In addition to this, 12 Libyan soldiers were captured. Pollack stated that the LARAF lost 10–20 Mirages. Cooper and Grandolini wrote that the force lost six Mirages and as many as 20 Soko G-2 Galebs and Jastrebs. Most Libyan military installations east of Tobruk were damaged to varying extents. The Egyptians suffered at most the loss of four aircraft and 100 casualties, as well as a number of soldiers captured. According to Arab diplomats, three Soviet military technicians who were assisting the Libyans in operating their radars were incidentally killed in the airstrikes, though they were not participating in the conflict. While the fighting was going on, an Egyptian military spokesperson told the press that "our forces were careful not to harm Libyan civilians." According to journalist Mayada El Gohary, no Libyan civilians were killed during the war.

== Aftermath ==
=== Truce ===
Libya and Egypt both portrayed the outcome as a victory for themselves. They never reached a formal peace agreement after the war, but ceased combat operations and upheld a truce. Tensions nevertheless remained high, with Sadat and Gaddafi trading insults in the days following the conflict. Libyan Foreign Minister Abdel Moneim al-Houni wrote a letter to the United Nations Security Council, alleging that the Egyptians had destroyed schools and hospitals, caused significant damage to five towns, and inflicted "a great loss of life among innocent civilians". The Security Council declined to discuss the matter. The Libyan government also accused the United States of sharing combat intelligence with Egypt. On 24 August, Egypt and Libya exchanged prisoners. Large concentrations of troops remained stationed along the border in the immediate aftermath of the conflict, but these were eventually withdrawn, as the lack of infrastructure in the area made long-term deployments of significant forces difficult.

International media was barred from the combat zone during the war, making independent confirmation about details of the conflict difficult. Observers were surprised by Sadat's sudden declaration of a ceasefire, as Egyptian officials had been telling diplomats that Sadat intended on invading Libya and deposing Gaddafi. Over the course of the border war the Palestinian Liberation Organisation leader Yasser Arafat flew between Tripoli and Cairo in an attempt to mediate its resolution. Two Libyan military officers accompanied Arafat to Egypt to attempt to reach a solution. Shortly before the end of fighting the President of Algeria, Houari Boumediène, also intervened to mediate, and the government of Kuwait announced it would assist. However, several diplomatic sources reported that the United States government had encouraged Sadat to end the conflict. Taking into account Egyptian performance during the end of the Yom Kippur War in 1973 and the lack of infrastructure in the Western Desert, American officials believed that the Egyptians could not sustain an invasion of Libya and would thus be forced to withdraw. The Americans believed this would damage Sadat's reputation, thus undermining his political clout or even possibly leading to his downfall. Since the United States deemed him to be of key importance in Egypt achieving peace with Israel, its ally, they pressed him to end the fighting. They also feared that the Soviets would intervene in favor of Libya.

=== Effects of the war ===
According to The New Arab, the Four-Day War initiated a new era of conflict in the Middle East characterised by fighting between Arab states instead of combat between them and Israel. The war disrupted the cross-border trade and smuggling activities of the Bedouins, a nomadic people who resided in both countries. Thousands of Egyptians residing in Libya and employed in the civil service, oil industry, agriculture, commerce, and education subsequently left the country, upsetting the economy and hampering public services. Many mines laid in Libya during the war remained there as late as 2006. Many observers in Arab states were concerned by the clash, feeling that it was advantageous to Israel. To Gaddafi, the war proved that Sadat was serious about countering Libyan influence in Egypt. Realising that he could not challenge Egypt's armed forces, the Libyan leader decreased his military pressure on the country. Upset with the LARAF's performance during the conflict, he dismissed al-Firjani and replaced him with an officer who immediately set about modernising the force. Despite Libya's substantial human and materiel losses during the war, the appearance that Libya's smaller army had held back an Egyptian offensive boosted the military's morale and Gaddafi's domestic political standing. To Sadat and his military commanders, the conflict revealed that Libya had amassed a substantial arsenal of materiel which had the potential to disrupt regional balances of power.

Meanwhile, Sadat continued to pursue negotiations with Israel to the chagrin of Libya and other Arab countries. Israeli officials feared that the Libyans would initiate a second war to oust Sadat, thus dooming the prospects of peace with Egypt. Relations between Libya and Egypt declined further after Sadat travelled to Jerusalem in November 1977. Nevertheless, Egypt and Israel signed a peace agreement in 1978, returning the Sinai Peninsula to Egyptian control. Egypt promptly moved forces to its western border, and Libya responded by drawing its forces back to avoid another confrontation. Gaddafi softened his rhetoric against Egypt in the following years, but actively rallied other Arab states to isolate the country and deprecate the policies of Sadat and his successor, Hosni Mubarak.
