= Musaid =

Town in Butnan, Libya

Musaid امساعد Imsasd, Msaad
- Town
- Location in Libya
- Coordinates: 31°34′33″N 25°2′23″E
- Country: Libya
- Region: Cyrenaica
- District: Butnan

Population (2006)
  - Total: 7,139
- Time zone: UTC+2 (EET)

Musaid or Imsaad (Arabic: امساعد) is a town in Butnan District in eastern Libya. Alternative names include: Oistant, Msa'ed, Imsa'ed, and Musa'ed. Musaid lies approximately 150 kilometres (93 miles) east of Tobruk and is the major border crossing between Libya and Egypt.

== History ==
Musaid was the site of heavy fighting during the brief Libyan–Egyptian War of 1977. This war, the break-off of Libyan-Egyptian diplomatic relations, and the resultant trade embargo with Egypt, had a very negative impact on Musaid. For example, Musaid's population shrank from 4,330 in 1973 to 3,200 in 1984 (-26.1%), while overall Libya's population rose in the same period by 60.30%.

== Culture ==
Nearby is the Sidi Shahir Ruhih shrine.

== Economy ==
Musaid's economy depended heavily on trade between Egypt and Libya. After the 1977 war and the subsequent trade embargo with Egypt, this was replaced in part by smuggling, aided by the close tribal ties across the border. In 2008, the Libyan government acted to suppress the smugglers.

== Border crossing ==
As of autumn 2010, a large suite of new border facilities is under construction.

== See also ==
- List of cities in Libya
