= Operation Brevity order of battle =

Order of battle for 1941 WWII battle

This is the order of battle for Operation Brevity, a World War II battle between the British Commonwealth and the European Axis powers of Germany and Italy in North Africa between May 15–16, 1941.

== British Commonwealth forces ==
General Officer, Commanding in chief, Middle East Command - General Archibald Wavell

HQ Western Desert Force - Lieutenant-General Noel Beresford-Peirse

Operational command - Brigadier William Gott

The British and Commonwealth force were drawn mainly from the 7th Armoured Division's, 7th Armoured Brigade and 7th Support Group and from the independent 22nd Guards Brigade. They were organised into three groups:

- Coast Group
  - 2nd battalion The Rifle Brigade (minus one company)
  - Mortar support, 3rd battalion Coldstream Guards
  - 5th Australian Anti-tank Battery, 2/2nd Australian Anti-Tank Regiment (2 Pounder Anti Tank guns)
  - 8th Field Regiment, Royal Artillery (25 Pounder Field guns)
- 22nd Guards Brigade group
  - 1st battalion Durham Light Infantry
  - 2nd battalion Scots Guards
  - 3rd battalion Coldstream Guards
  - 4th Royal Tank Regiment (24 Matilda Mk II Infantry tanks)
  - One troop, 12th Anti-Tank Battery, 2/3rd Australian Anti-tank Regiment (2 Pounder Anti Tank guns)
- 7th Armoured Brigade group
  - A Company, 2nd battalion The Rifle Brigade
  - 2nd Royal Tank Regiment (29 Cruiser tanks)
  - 6th Australian Division Cavalry (~28 Light Tank Mk VIB)
  - 7th Support Group (elements)
  - 11th Hussars(Marmon-Herrington Armoured Cars)
  - One troop, 12th Anti-Tank Battery, 2/3rd Australian Anti-tank Regiment (2 Pounder Anti Tank guns)

== German and Italian forces ==
Comandante Superiore Generale d'Armata - General Italo Gariboldi

- Afrika Korps - Major General Erwin Rommel
  - Kampfgruppe von Herff
    - Reconnaissance Battalion 3
    - 2nd Battalion, Panzer Regiment 5
    - Motorcycle Battalion 15
    - Reconnaissance Battalion 33
    - One Motorised Infantry Battalion, 102nd Motorised Division Trento
    - One AA Battery (88 mm Anti aircraft guns)
    - Two AA Platoons (20 mm Anti aircraft guns)
    - Two 105mm leFH Howitzer
- 8th Bersaglieri Regiment - Colonel Ugo Montemurro
- Italian Forces
  - Defending the border
    - Two Companies, 5th Motorised Infantry Battalion
    - One Mountain Gun Battery (Cannone da 75/27)
    - One AT Battery (Cannone da 47/32 M35)
    - Group Two, 24th artillery regiment
      - One Field Gun Battery (12 Cannone da 105/28)
  - Defending Bardia
    - 2nd Battalion, 62nd Infantry Regiment
    - One AT Battery (Cannone da 47/32 M35)
    - One AA Battery (20 mm Anti aircraft guns)

Following the British attacks General Rommel ordered the following force, under the command of Lieutenant-Colonel Hans Crammer, to the frontier to defeat the British.

- 1st Battalion, Panzer Regiment 8
- One Flak battery

During the morning of May 16, Rommel ordered further forces to the frontier.

- Kampfgrppe von Esebeck
  - Schuetzen Regiment 200
    - One battalion
  - 1st Battalion, Panzer Regiment 5
    - Medium tank Company (minus one platoon)
  - One Panzerjäger Company
  - One artillery battalion (minus one battery)

== See also ==
- List of orders of battle

== Bibliography ==
- Clarke, Dudley (1952). The Eleventh At War: Being The Story Of The XIth Hussars (Prince Albert's Own) Through The Years 1934-1945. Michael Joseph.
- Erskine, David (2001) [1956]. The Scots Guards 1919-1955. DNaval & Military Press Ltd. ISBN 1-84342-061-9.
- Hastings, Major R.H.W.S. (1950). The Rifle Brigade In The Second World War 1939-1945. Gale & Polden.
- Howard, Michael; Sparrow, John (1951). The Coldstream Guards, 1920-1946. Oxford University Press.
- Jentz, Thomas L. (1998). Tank Combat In North Africa: The Opening Rounds, Operation Sonnenblume, Brevity, Skorpion and Battleaxe, February 1941 - June 1941. Schiffer Publishing Ltd. ISBN 0-7643-0226-4.
- Maughan, Barton (1966). Official History of Australia in the Second World War Volume III – Tobruk and El Alamein. Chapters 4 - 9. Series 1 - Army. Canberra: Australian War Memorial.
- Playfair, Major General I.S.O.; others (2006) [1954]. The Mediterranean and Middle East, Volume II The Germans come to the help of their Ally (1941). History of the Second World War, United Kingdom Military Series, Official Campaign History. Naval & Military Press. ISBN 1-84734-427-5.
- Rommel, Erwin (1982) [1953]. Liddell Hart, Basil (ed.). The Rommel Papers. Da Capo Press. ISBN 0-306-80157-4.
- Government of India (2004) [1944]. The Tiger Kills: The Indian Divisions in the North African Campaign, 1941-1943. Military Library Research Service Ltd.
- Government of India. The Tiger Strikes.
- Wake, Major-General Sir Hereward; Deeds, W.F. (1949). Swift and bold: The story of the King's Royal Rifle Corps in the Second World War 1939-1945. Gale & Polden.
- Ward, S.G.P.; Poett, Nigel (2005) [1963]. Faithful: The story of the Durham Light Infantry. Naval & Military Press Ltd. ISBN 1-84574-147-1.
