= Operation Skorpion =

Military operation during the Western Desert Campaign of the Second World War

Operation Scorpion / Unternehmen Skorpion
- Part of the Western Desert campaign of the Second World War
- The area of fighting from 24 March – 17 June 1941
Date	26–27 May 1941
Location	Halfaya Pass, Egypt 31.51°N 25.19°E
Result	German victory
Territorial changes	Germany re-captured Halfaya Pass

Belligerents
United Kingdom	Germany

Commanders and leaders
William Gott	Maximilian von Herff

Strength
Infantry battalion and supporting arms	Kampfgruppe von Herff

Casualties and losses
173 men; 12 guns; 5 Infantry tanks	

Operation Skorpion (Unternehmen Skorpion) from 26 to 27 May 1941, was a military operation during the Western Desert Campaign of the Second World War. The operation was conducted by Axis forces under the command of Colonel Maximilian von Herff and resisted by British forces under Lieutenant-General William "Strafer" Gott. A counter-attack was made on British positions at Halfaya Pass in north-western Egypt, which had been captured during Operation Brevity (15–16 May). Unternehmen Skorpion was the second offensive operation commanded by Rommel in Africa (apart from the Siege of Tobruk).

Skorpion pushed the British out of Halfaya Pass and forced them to retire to the area from Buq Buq to Sofafi. The Germans and Italians fortified the pass and built other strong points back towards Sidi Azeiz as tank killing zones, ready to meet another British attack. The British continued with preparations for Operation Battleaxe (15–17 June) but it was another costly British failure that led to the sacking of General Sir Archibald Wavell, Commander-in-Chief Middle East and other senior officers.

== Background ==
=== Unternehmen Sonnenblume ===
After the British victory over the Italian 10th Army in Operation Compass, Oberkommando der Wehrmacht (OKW, armed forces high command) began Unternehmen Sonnenblume (Operation Sunflower), the dispatch of the Deutsches Afrika Korps (DAK, Generalleutnant Erwin Rommel) to Libya to reinforce the remnants of the 10th Army. Rommel attacked at once, driving the British from Cyrenaica and across the Egyptian border, except for the port of Tobruk, where a nine-month siege began. By 8 April, advanced German units had reached Derna east of the Jebel Akhdar but some units had run out of water and fuel at Tengeder. A column of reconnaissance, anti-tank, machine-gun and artillery units was sent ahead to block the eastern exit from Tobruk and on 10 April, Rommel made the Suez Canal the DAK objective. A break-out from Tobruk was to be prevented and next day the port was invested; Reconnaissance Unit 3 went on to Bardia and a composite force was sent to Sollum, about 9.3 mi (15 km) into Egypt, to try to reach Mersa Matruh. The improvised Mobile Force (Brigadier William Gott) conducted a delaying-action against the Axis on the frontier around Sollum and Fort Capuzzo and from Halfaya Pass eastwards to Sidi Barrani. The first Italo-German offensive had been an operational success but supply constraints made it impossible to advance further than the Egyptian border. The Axis forces were distracted by the siege of Tobruk, while the British began to rebuild their strength in Egypt.

=== Halfaya Pass ===
The Western Desert, is about 240 mi (390 km) wide, from Mersa Matruh in Egypt to Gazala on the Libyan coast. The Sand Sea 150 mi (240 km) inland to the south, marks the limit of the desert, which is widest at Giarabub and Siwa Oasis. In British parlance, the Western Desert came to include eastern Cyrenaica in Libya. From the coast, extending inland lies a raised, flat plain of stony desert about 500 ft (150 m) above sea level, 120–190 mi (200–300 km) wide, with the Sand Sea beyond. Westwards from Sofafi in Egypt, there are few places where the escarpment can be traversed north to south by wheeled or tracked vehicles. The Litoranea Balbo (Via Balbia) was the only paved road. Scorpions, vipers and flies populate the region, which is inhabited by a small number of Bedouin nomads. Halfaya Pass is a gap in the escarpment near Sollum, about 0.62 mi (1 km) inland. In Operation Brevity (15–16 May), British forces attacked through Halfaya Pass, against the desert flank of the Axis forces. The attack was intended to reach Sidi Azeiz, beyond Fort Capuzzo in Libya and destroy any Axis forces met during the advance. The attack was repulsed except at the pass, which was captured by the 2nd Battalion Scots Guards and then garrisoned by the 3rd Battalion Coldstream Guards (Lieutenant-Colonel John Moubray), a squadron of Infantry tanks from the 4th Royal Tank Regiment (4th RTR, Major C. G. Miles), field, anti-tank and anti-aircraft guns, with the 7th Support Group of the 7th Armoured Division on the southern flank.

== Prelude ==
=== Operation Brevity ===
Operation Brevity area of operations

Operation Brevity (15–16 May) was a limited British offensive, planned as a rapid blow against weak Axis front-line forces around Sollum, Fort Capuzzo and Bardia on the Egyptian–Libyan frontier. The port garrison of Tobruk, 100 mi (160 km) to the west, had resisted Axis attacks and its Australian and British troops endangered the Axis supply line from Tripoli, which led Rommel to give priority to the siege, leaving the front line thinly held. The British objectives were to capture ground from which to begin an offensive toward Tobruk and to inflict losses on the German and Italian forces. On 15 May, Gott attacked with a mixed infantry and armoured force in three columns.

Halfaya Pass was taken against determined Italian opposition and in Libya, the British captured Fort Capuzzo but German counter-attacks regained the fort during the afternoon, causing many casualties among the defenders. The operation had begun well and had thrown the Axis commanders into confusion but most of its early gains were lost to counter-attacks and with German reinforcements arriving from Tobruk, the operation was called off. Gott became concerned that his forces risked being caught in the open by German tanks and conducted a staged withdrawal to the Halfaya Pass on 16 May.

=== Plan ===
Unternehmen Skorpion was intended to recapture Halfaya Pass by a demonstration on a wide front, bluffing the British into a withdrawal. On the frontier, Kampfgruppe von Herff (Oberst Maximilian von Herff), included Panzer Regiment 8 and troops from Motorised Infantry Regiment 15, Reconnaissance Battalion 33 and a battalion of Rifle Regiment 104. The panzer regiment had 160 tanks but insufficient fuel and only 70 panzers were used in the attack. The Kampfgruppe was divided into Gruppe Wechmar on the right, with much of the artillery that was to perform a flanking move to the right towards Deir el Hamra. In the centre, Gruppe Cramer with most of the tanks, was to advance on Sidi Suleiman to the south-west of the pass and on the left (coastal) flank, Gruppe Bach was to advance close to the escarpment against the British infantry positions, where there was bad going for tanks. Gruppe Knabe was held in reserve and if the British stood their ground, Gruppe Wechmar and Gruppe Cramer were to concentrate before attacking.

== Battle ==
During the evening of 26 May, Kampfgruppe von Herff assembled on the coast at the foot of Halfaya Pass. The kampfgruppe attacked the next morning, intending to bluff the British into retiring from the plateau above the escarpment. A panzer battalion west of Fort Capuzzo manoeuvred as a decoy, to give the British the impression that an outflanking move was under way on the desert flank. Only Gruppe Bach encountered opposition and in the afternoon, Herff ordered the tanks of Gruppe Cramer to move northwards to defeat the British at Halfaya. The move took place during the night and at dawn on 27 May, Gruppe Knabe attacked the head of the pass, Gruppe Bach attacked the foot and the panzers appeared at the top of the escarpment and bombarded the coastal plain. The commander of the nine 4th RTR tanks at Halfaya ordered an advance to engage the German tanks and during the morning, Gott authorised a withdrawal. Moubray managed to extricate the battalion, although some Guards were captured at the bottom of the pass by Gruppe Bach. There were no British forces near enough to reinforce and the pass was re-occupied by Axis troops.

== Aftermath ==
=== Analysis ===
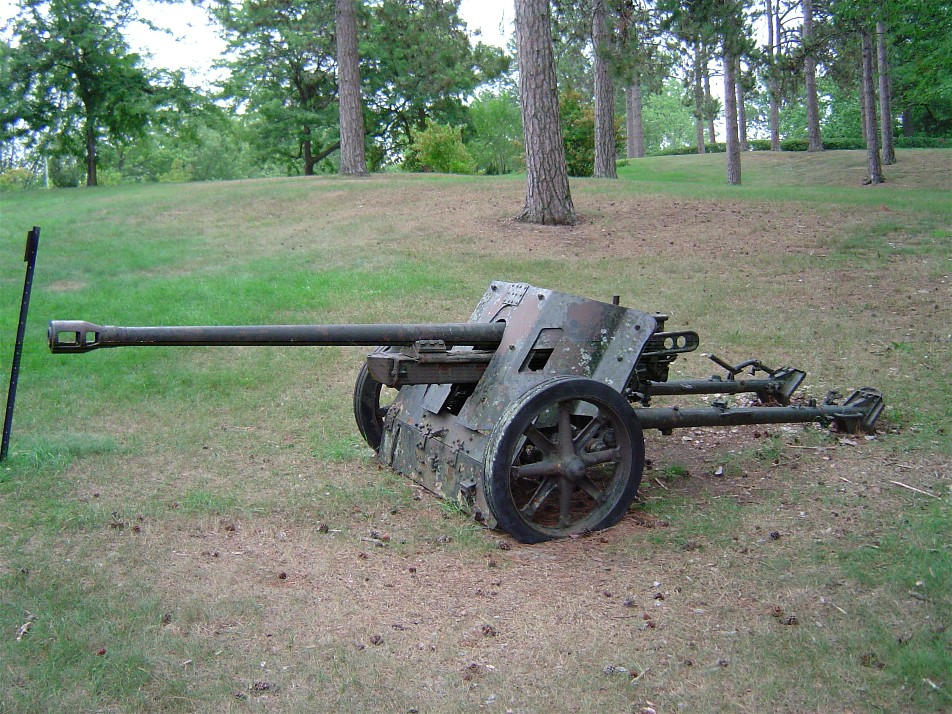
Example of a German 50 mm PAK 38 anti-tank gun

The Axis victories during Operation Brevity and Unternehmen Skorpion were a consequence of the technical superiority of some German equipment, particularly in anti-tank guns and wireless. German field intelligence gleaned and exploited quickly, tactically useful information from British wireless signals and captured documents. British intelligence had the advantage of Ultra decrypts, particularly from Luftwaffe signals but the time taken to send the information from England to Cairo and then deliver it to the commanders on the frontier, made much of it obsolete, even when it contained useful tactical information. Rommel was able secretly and rapidly to reinforce the frontier posts from Tobruk when Operation Brevity began and then spring the surprise at Halfaya Pass on 27 May. (The garrison at Tobruk had made two small raids during Operation Brevity but the commander had not been informed of the operation until 17 May.)

=== Casualties ===
The British suffered casualties of 173 men, four 25-pounder field guns, eight 2-pounder anti-tank guns and five Infantry tanks. Herff reported that forty prisoners, nine 25-pounder field guns, seven Matilda tanks and two other tanks had been captured.

=== Tiger Convoy ===
On 12 May, the Tiger convoy arrived in Alexandria with 238 tanks and 43 Hawker Hurricane fighters. The tanks included 21 Light Tank Mk VI, 82 Cruiser tanks (including fifty of the new Crusader tanks) and 135 Infantry tanks. There were delays in unloading the tanks, which also had to be adapted for desert use and Battleaxe was postponed until 10 June. The tanks were intended for the 7th Armoured Division, which had been out of action since February after most of its tanks had been worn out during Operation Compass.

== Subsequent operations ==
=== Axis defensive preparations ===
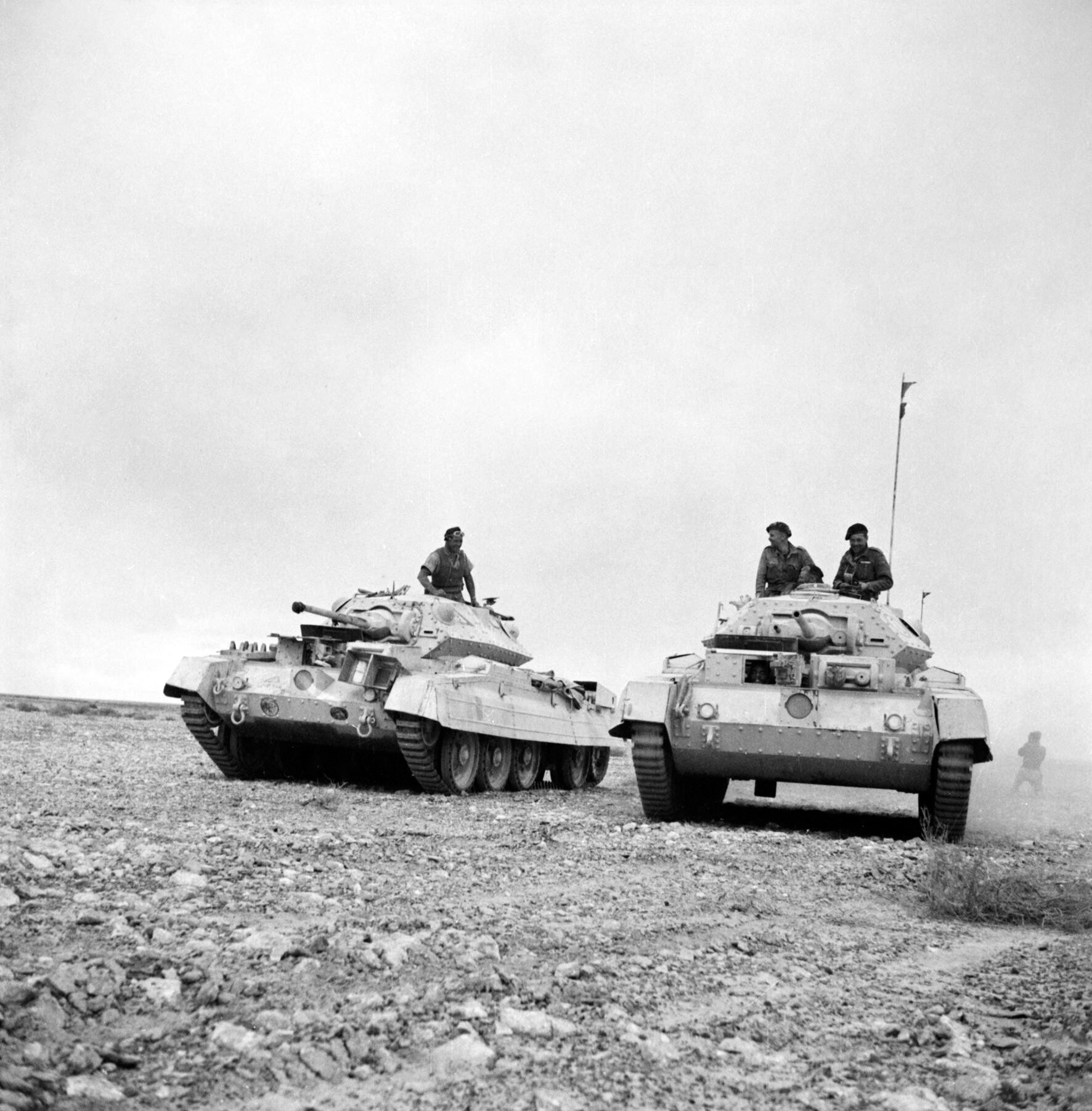
Tanks, Cruiser, Mk VI (Crusaders), photographed in September 1941

After the re-capture of Halfaya Pass, the Axis forces fortified the Gazala line and the siege lines around Tobruk in Libya. The 5th Light Afrika Division was withdrawn on 8 June, to refit at El Adem near Tobruk and replaced on the frontier with the 15th Panzer Division (Generalmajor Walter Neumann-Silkow), with three Italian infantry battalions and an artillery regiment from the 102nd Motorised Division Trento in support at Sollum, Musaid and Capuzzo. The Axis troops built a defensive line just over the border in Egypt, based on Halfaya Pass, in an arc through Qalala and Hafid Ridge 6 mi (9.7 km) south-west of Fort Capuzzo to Sidi Azeiz. (Note: Panzer Regiment 8 (two battalions), Reconnaissance Unit 33, I Battery, Artillery Regiment 33, I Battalion, Motorised Infantry Regiment 104, Panzerjäger (tank hunter) Battalion 33 (twenty-one 37 mm and twelve 50 mm PAK 38 anti-tank guns), Motor-cycle Battalion 15, an anti-aircraft battery (with thirteen 88 mm guns three Italian infantry battalions and three Italian field artillery batteries).) Rommel adopted the defensive tactics which had been used to defeat the Axis attack on Tobruk at Ras el Medauar in late April.

Six strong points were built in which 88 mm guns and 50 mm anti-tank guns were dug in down to their barrels, camouflaged and organised for all-round defence. Even with a relatively small force on the frontier, supply difficulties made stocking the defences with water, fuel and ammunition difficult. Hauptmann Wilhelm Bach, the commander of the anti-tank unit that contained most of the 13 88 mm guns in North Africa, sited five of the 88 mm guns and several 50 mm anti-tank guns in the new fortifications at Halfaya, held by a battalion of Rifle Regiment 104. Turrets were removed from knocked-out Matildas and dug in; the bottom of the pass was sown with anti-tank and anti-personnel mines. Four 88 mm guns were dug in behind minefields on Hafid Ridge and Sidi Azeiz Ridge covering the Sidi Azeiz crossroads; the last four 88 mm guns remained mobile with the 15th Panzer Division. The British made preparations for Operation Battleaxe, which was due to begin as soon as tank reinforcements were ready from the Tiger convoy, which had arrived from Britain on 12 May.

=== Operation Battleaxe ===
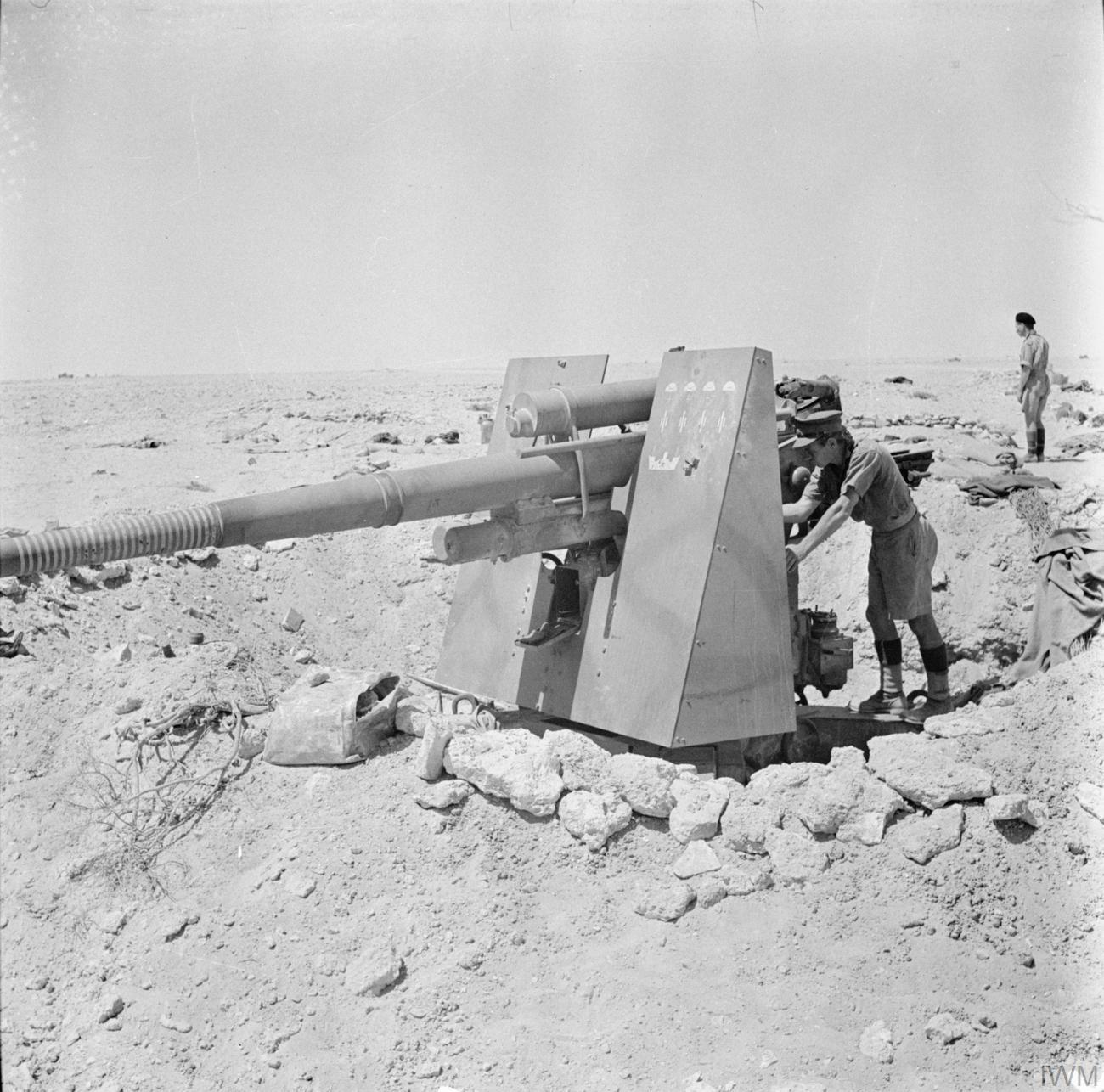
A dug-in 88 mm gun, captured in July 1942, similar to those dug in at Halfaya Pass after Unternehmen Skorpion.

On 15 June, the Axis garrisons of Halfaya Pass, Bardia, Sollum, Capuzzo and Sidi Aziez were to be destroyed by the Western Desert Force (Lieutenant-General Noel Beresford-Peirse) with the 4th Indian Division, 7th Armoured Division and the 22nd Guards Brigade, which were then to capture the area around Tobruk and El Adem and advance further west to take Derna and Mechili. Poor British signals security gave Rommel notice of the operation and its course; during the battle, captured documents were exploited. The 5th Light Afrika Division was moved to the south of Tobruk, ready for operations in the Sollum area or Tobruk and Rommel ordered a big artillery bombardment of Tobruk, the night before the operation, to prevent the Allied garrison from breaking out.

On 17 June, XIII Corps was ordered to retire before the 22nd Guards Brigade was trapped; by dark, the British had withdrawn to the area of Sidi Barrani–Sofafi and the Axis troops had returned to their positions on the frontier. The British suffered 969 casualties, 27 of the 90 Cruiser tanks and 64 of the 100 Infantry tanks which had started the operation. German casualties were 678 men, 12 tanks destroyed, about 50 damaged (excluding vehicles repaired during the battle) and ten aircraft. British troops captured about 350 Italians but let most go when they withdrew. On 1 July, Wavell was sacked and replaced by General Claude Auchinleck, the Commander-in-Chief, India; Beresford-Pierce was sacked and replaced by Lieutenant-General Reade Godwin-Austen.

== See also ==
- North African campaign timeline
- List of World War II Battles
- List of German military equipment of World War II
- List of British military equipment of World War II
