= Operation Brevity =

1941 World War II military offensive

- Part of the Western Desert campaign of the Second World War
- The Egyptian and Libyan border over which Operation Brevity was conducted
Date	15–16 May 1941
Location	Egyptian–Libyan border 31°34′51″N 25°03′08″E
Result	Inconclusive

Belligerents
United Kingdom; Australia	Germany; Italy

Commanders and leaders
Archibald Wavell; William Gott	Erwin Rommel; Maximilian von Herff; Ugo Montemurro

Strength
3 infantry battalions; 53 tanks	Parts of several battalions; 30–50 tanks

Casualties and losses
206+ casualties; 5 tanks destroyed; 6 aircraft destroyed	605+ casualties; 3 tanks destroyed

Operation Brevity was an attack in mid-May 1941, during the Western Desert Campaign of the Second World War. Conceived by the commander-in-chief of the British Middle East Command, General Archibald Wavell, Brevity was intended to be a rapid blow against weak Axis front-line forces in the Sollum–Capuzzo–Bardia area of the border between Egypt and Libya. Although the operation got off to a promising start, throwing the Axis high command into confusion, most of its early gains were lost to local counter-attacks. With German reinforcements being rushed to the front, the operation was called off after one day.

Egypt had been invaded by Libyan-based Italian forces in September 1940, but by February of the following year a British counter-offensive had advanced well into Libya, destroying the Italian 10th Army in the process. British attention then shifted to Greece, which was under the threat of Axis invasion. While Allied divisions were being diverted from North Africa, the Italians reinforced their positions and were supported by the arrival of the German Afrika Korps under Generalleutnant Erwin Rommel. Rapidly taking the offensive against his distracted and over-stretched opponent, by April 1941 Rommel had driven the British and Commonwealth forces in Cyrenaica back across the Egyptian border. Although the battlefront now lay in the border area, the port city of Tobruk—100 mi (160 km) inside Libya—had resisted the Axis advance, and its substantial Australian and British garrison constituted a significant threat to Rommel's lengthy supply chain. He committed his main strength to besieging the city, leaving the front line only thinly held.

Wavell defined the objectives of Brevity to be the acquisition of territory from which to launch another offensive toward Tobruk and the depletion of German and Italian forces in the region. With few battle-ready units to draw on, in the wake of Rommel's recent successes, on 15 May Brigadier William Gott attacked in three columns with a mixed infantry and armoured force. The strategically important Halfaya Pass was taken against stiff Italian opposition and Fort Capuzzo, deeper inside Libya, was captured. German counter-attacks commanded by Colonel Maximilian von Herff regained the fort during the afternoon causing many casualties to its defenders. Gott—concerned that his forces were in danger of being caught by German armour in open ground—conducted a staged withdrawal to the Halfaya Pass on 16 May and Brevity was ended. Eleven days later the Halfaya Pass was recaptured by Axis forces in Operation Skorpion.

== Background ==
In early September 1940, the Italian 10th Army based in Libya conducted the Italian invasion of Egypt, and three months later the British and Commonwealth troops of the Western Desert Force began a counter-offensive, codenamed Operation Compass. In two months, the British advanced 500 mi (800 km), occupying the Italian province of Cyrenaica and destroying the 10th Army. The advance was halted in February 1941 due to supply shortages and because priority had been given to the Battle of Greece. Renamed XIII Corps and reorganised under HQ Cyrenaica Command (CYRCOM), the troops of the former Western Desert Force adopted a defensive posture. Over the next few months, HQ Cyrenaica lost its commander, Lieutenant-General Sir Henry Maitland Wilson, followed by the 2nd New Zealand Division and the 6th Australian Division when they were sent to Greece in Operation Lustre. The 7th Armoured Division, with virtually no serviceable tanks left, was also withdrawn to the Nile Delta for rest and refitting. Wilson was replaced by Lieutenant-General Philip Neame; parts of the 2nd Armoured Division and 9th Australian Division were deployed to Cyrenaica but both formations were inexperienced, ill-equipped and, in the case of the 2nd Armoured Division, well under strength after detachments to Greece.

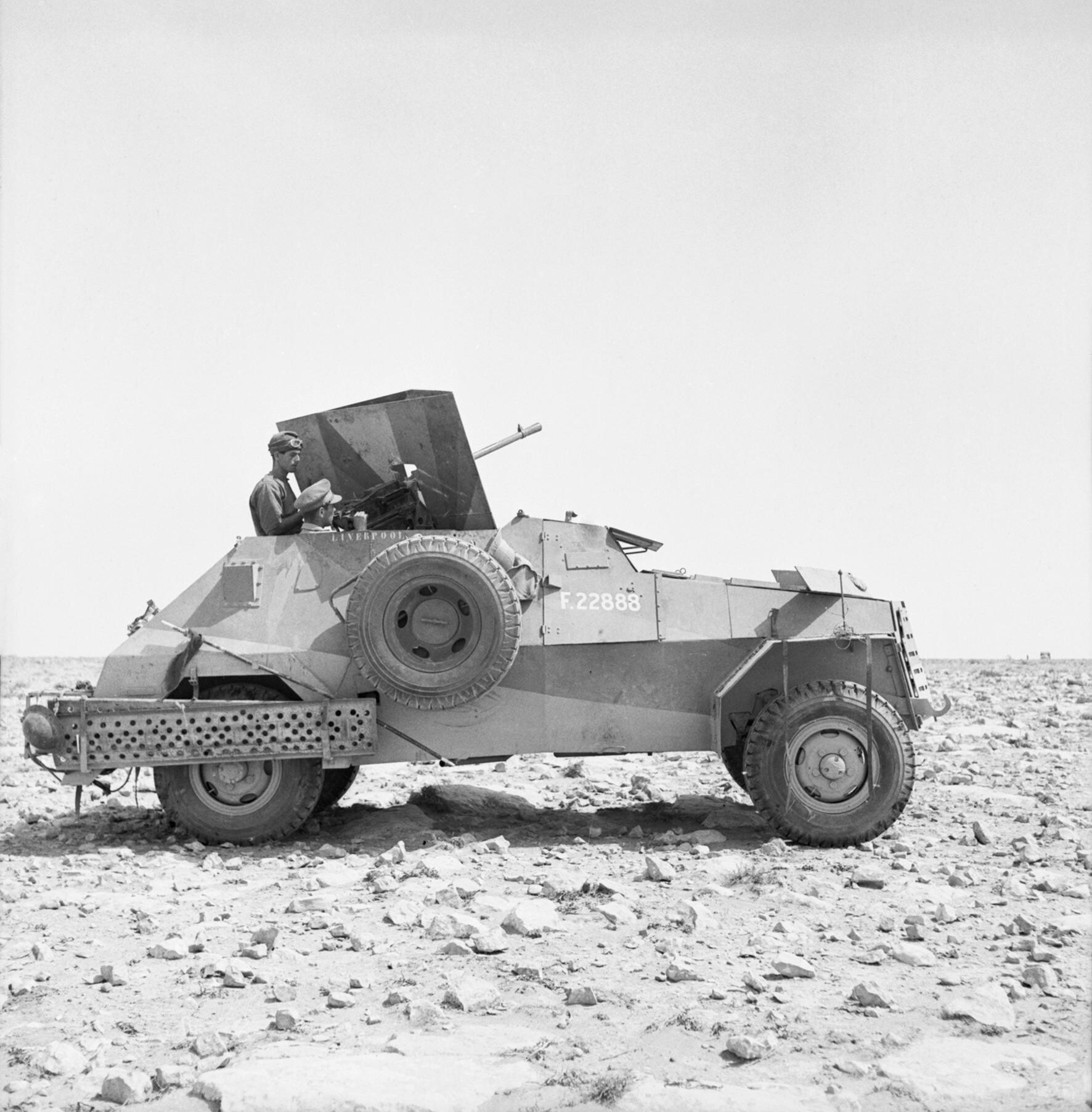
British Marmon-Herrington Mk II armoured car, as operated by the 11th Hussars

The Italians sent the 132nd Armored Division "Ariete" and 102nd Motorized Division "Trento" to North Africa. From February 1941 until early May, Operation Sonnenblume saw the arrival of the German Afrika Korps in Tripoli to reinforce their Italian allies. Commanded by Generalleutnant Erwin Rommel and consisting of the 5th Light and 15th Panzer Division, the Afrika Korps was to block British attempts to drive the Italians out of the region. Rommel seized on the weakness of his opponents and, without waiting for his forces fully to assemble, rapidly went on the offensive.

During March and April, the remaining units of the 2nd Armoured Division were destroyed as the Axis forces advanced, which also forced the British and Commonwealth forces into retreat. (Note: Only ten British tanks were lost in action; the remainder were caused by breakdowns and lack of fuel.) Neame and the General Officer Commanding British Troops in Egypt—Lieutenant-General Richard O'Connor—were captured and the British command structure had to be reorganised. HQ Cyrenaica was dissolved on 14 April and its command functions taken over by a new HQ Western Desert Force (Lieutenant-General Noel Beresford-Peirse). The 9th Australian Infantry Division fell back to the fortress port of Tobruk and the remaining British forces withdrew a further 100 mi (160 km) east to Sollum on the Egypt–Libya border.

With the main Axis force conducting the siege of Tobruk a battlegroup (Kampfgruppe) commanded by Colonel Maximilian von Herff continued to press eastwards. Capturing Fort Capuzzo and Bardia in passing, it then advanced into Egypt; by the end of April it had taken Sollum and the important Halfaya Pass. Rommel garrisoned these positions, reinforced the Kampfgruppe and ordered it onto the defensive. The Tobruk garrison received supplies from the Royal Navy and Rommel was unable to take the port. The Axis positions at Sollum were at the end of a long supply route from Tripoli, threatened by the Tobruk garrison. The substantial commitment required to invest Tobruk prevented him from building up his forces at Sollum, making further advances into Egypt impractical. (Note: Tripoli was the main supply base and all supplies then had to be shipped along the coast or driven to the front.) By maintaining possession of Tobruk, the British had the initiative.

== Prelude ==
The battlefield over which Operation Brevity was fought

General Archibald Wavell—the commander-in-chief of the British Middle East Command—conceived Operation Brevity as a rapid blow in the Sollum area. Wavell intended to create advantageous conditions from which to launch Operation Battleaxe, an offensive that he was planning for June. Brevity was to recapture the Halfaya Pass, drive the enemy from the Sollum and Capuzzo areas and inflict casualties. A secondary objective was to advance toward Tobruk, although only as far as supplies would allow and without risking the force committed to the operation.

=== Allied force ===
Brevity was to be carried out by the 22nd Guards Brigade and part of the 7th Armoured Division. Its armoured component consisted of 29 cruiser tanks of the 2nd Royal Tank Regiment (2nd RTR) and 24 infantry tanks of the 4th Royal Tank Regiment (4th RTR). (Note: The cruiser tanks were six Mk Is, seventeen Mk IIAs and seven Mk IVAs, although one of these thirty tanks was in a field depot under repair. The infantry tanks were Matilda Mk IIs. The Allied force was organised into informal brigade groups, with individual units of the 7th Armoured Division detached to different brigade groups according to their mission. As well as the specific units identified in this article, brigade groups included supporting arms, such as artillery batteries, and additional units that played no significant part in the operation.) The Royal Air Force (RAF) allocated all its fighters and a small force of bombers to the operation. Brigadier William Gott—in command of all Allied front-line forces since the retreat—was to lead the operation, and his plan was to advance in three parallel columns.

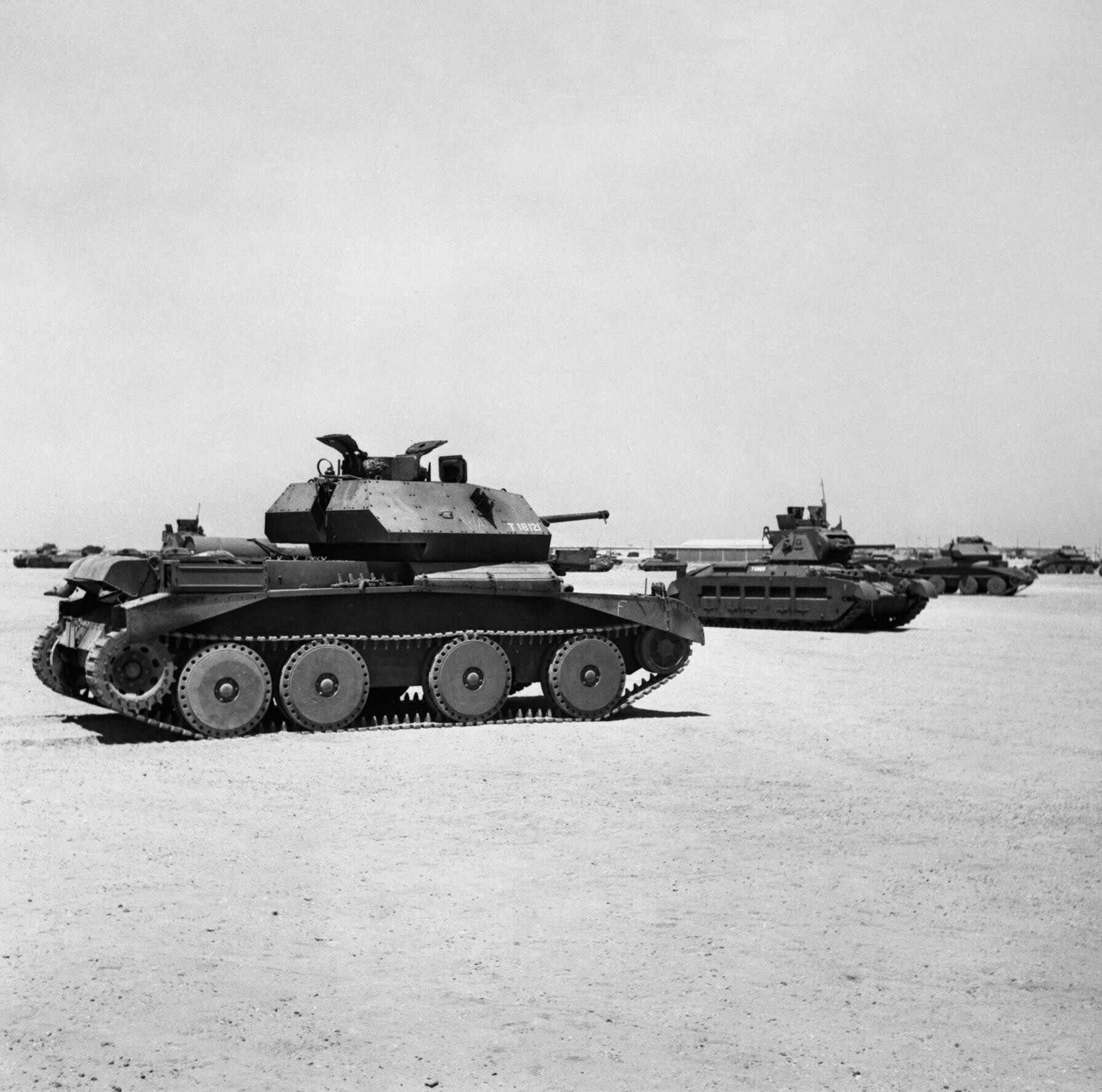
British Cruiser Mk IV (foreground) and Matilda infantry tanks

On the desert flank to the south, the 7th Armoured Brigade group was to move 30 mi (48 km) from Bir el Khireigat to Sidi Azeiz, destroying any opposition encountered en route. This group included three small mobile forces ("Jock columns") of the 7th Support Group, the cruiser tanks of 2nd RTR and the armoured cars of the 11th Hussars, whose task was to patrol the open desert on the left flank and monitor the Sidi Azeiz–Bardia road. In the centre, the 22nd Guards Brigade group was to clear the top of the Halfaya Pass and secure Bir Wair, Musaid and Fort Capuzzo, before conducting a company-sized probe toward Bardia. The group included two infantry battalions (1st Durham Light Infantry and 2nd Scots Guards) and the infantry tanks of the 4th RTR. In the north, the coast group was to advance along the coast road, to capture the lower Halfaya Pass, Sollum barracks and the town of Sollum. The group included elements of the 2nd Battalion Rifle Brigade and the 8th Field Regiment Royal Artillery.

=== Axis force ===
The main Axis opposition was Kampfgruppe von Herff on the desert plateau, with 30–50 tanks of the 2nd Battalion, Panzer Regiment 5, an Italian motorised infantry battalion of the Trento Division and supporting arms. The front line area around Halfaya Pass was defended by two companies of Bersaglieri—well-trained Italian motorised infantry—with artillery support. On 9 May, the Germans intercepted a British weather report over the radio. The Afrika Korps war diary noted that "In the past, such reports had always been issued prior to the important enemy offensives to capture Sidi Barrani, Bardia, Tobruk, and the Gebel". Rommel strengthened the eastern side of his cordon around Tobruk as a precaution against sorties from the garrison and ordered Kampfgruppe von Herff to adopt a more aggressive posture. On 13 May, Axis aircraft bombed British tank concentrations and Herff expected an imminent British attack. On the following day aircraft were unable to locate the British and it was reported that the "enemy intentions to attack were not known".

== Battle ==
=== Centre column ===
On 13 May, Wavell's infantry battalions began to concentrate at their start lines, followed by the tank regiments during the early hours of 15 May. At 06:00, the three columns began their advance, supported overhead by a standing patrol of Hawker Hurricane fighters. Reaching the top of the Halfaya Pass, the 22nd Guards Brigade group ran into heavy opposition from a company of the 8th Bersaglieri Regiment, supported by anti-tank guns, under the command of Colonel Ugo Montemurro. This unit fought tenaciously, doing much to repair the poor impression Rommel had of his Italian allies. Opening fire upon the attacking British tanks, the Bersaglieri found their 47 mm anti-tank guns could not penetrate the armour of the Matilda infantry tanks. At 400 yd (370 m), the gunners shifted targets, aiming at the tracks and undercarriages, when the tanks raised up crossing low stone walls and rocks, seven tanks were disabled. For his conduct during this action, Rommel recommended that Montemurro be awarded the Iron Cross First Class. At the cost of the seven tanks, the position was taken by C Squadron 4th RTR and G Company 2nd Scots Guards, and the brigade group pushed on towards the Bir Wair-Musaid road. At around 08:00, it received the surrender of a large German-Italian camp, and by 10:15 Bir Wair and Musaid had been taken in the face of sporadic opposition.

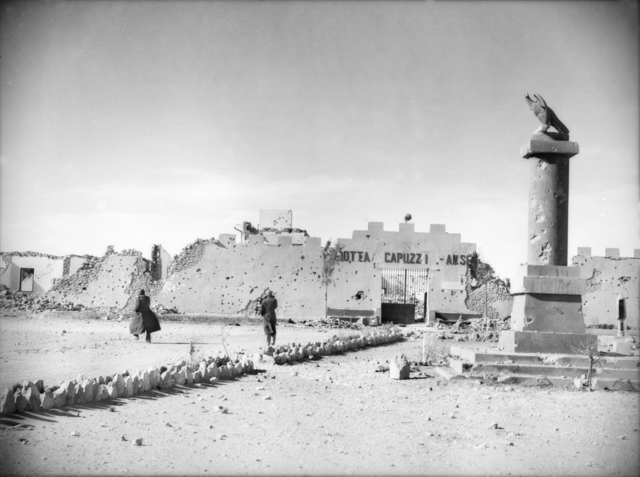
Fort Capuzzo, the focal point of much of the day's fighting

A Squadron 4th RTR and the 1st Durham Light Infantry (1DLI) continued the advance toward Fort Capuzzo. Concealed in hull down positions behind a ridge near the fort were 20–30 German tanks, supported by anti-tank guns. These engaged A Squadron, disabling five tanks, but were forced to withdraw as the squadron pressed its attack. On the final approach to Fort Capuzzo, contact was lost between 4th RTR's tanks and 1DLI's leading C Company, and the attack on the fort began without armoured support. The fort was vigorously defended, and it was not until just before midday that C Company, reunited with A Squadron 4th RTR and reinforced by A and B Companies 1DLI, eventually took the position. D Company 1DLI—which had been in reserve during the attack—then made a wide left hook to capture a small landing ground to the north of the fort.

In the afternoon, one company of the 2nd Scots Guards probed toward Bardia, the infantry coming under heavy machine gun fire from three positions as they neared Sollum barracks. A group of Universal Carriers—commanded by Sergeant F. Riley—charged the gun positions and quickly neutralised them, but one carrier was disabled when the group was subsequently engaged by anti-tank guns. Riley executed a second charge, silencing these too and taking their crews prisoner. His carrier was hit three times; for his actions Riley was awarded the Military Medal, the battalion's first decoration of the war. (Note: Erskine states "the Company was in an exposed position at the time, and there is no doubt that Sergeant Riley's speed and dash saved it from suffering heavy casualties.")

=== Desert column ===
On the desert flank, 2nd RTR advanced with the 7th Armoured Brigade group. During the morning, reports were received of up to 30 German armoured vehicles operating nearby, and A Squadron 2nd RTR moved to investigate. Most of the German force had pulled back, but three tanks were located and brought under fire. One Panzer IV was disabled and the other two driven off, for the loss of one British tank due to mechanical failure. A second force of 15 German tanks was engaged by two tanks of No 2 Troop, destroying a Panzer III and forcing the remainder to withdraw. By midday, the brigade group had reached a position west of Fort Capuzzo, and in the afternoon the nine remaining cruisers of A Squadron 2nd RTR began a reconnaissance patrol towards Sidi Azeiz.

=== Coastal column ===
The advance along the coastal road—which lacked tank support—was held up all morning by determined Italian resistance at the bottom of Halfaya Pass. This objective was finally achieved toward evening when S Company 2nd Rifle Brigade—supported by Australian anti-tank gunners fighting as infantry—overran the Italian positions taking around 130 prisoners.

=== Axis reactions ===
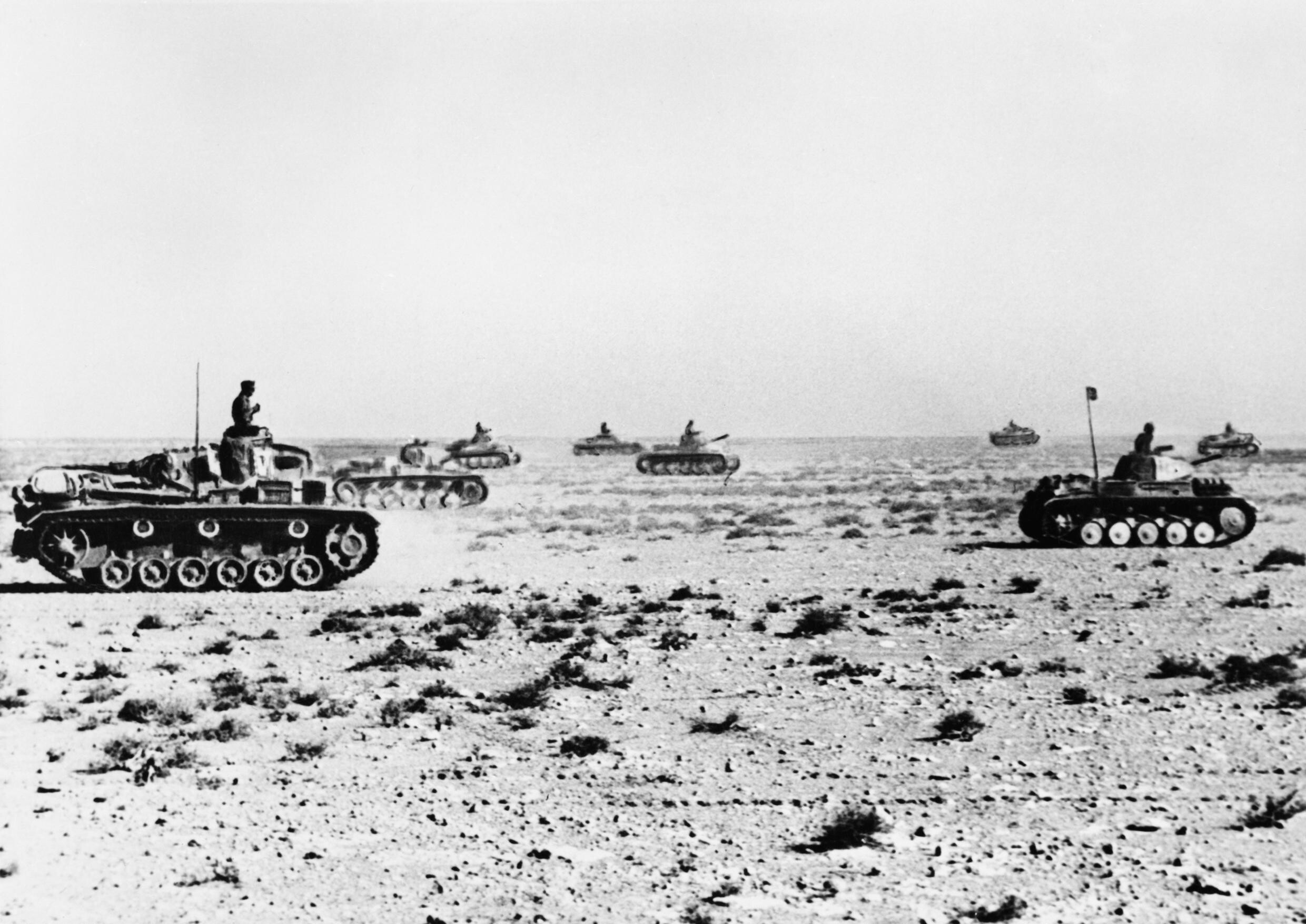
A Panzer II (right) and a Panzer III (left), the main tanks in use by the Afrika Korps during 1941, advance across the open desert.

Although the German and Italian commands in North Africa knew that a British offensive was imminent, Operation Brevity nevertheless caught them unprepared, and Rommel recorded in his diary that the initial attacks had caused him considerable losses. By midday on 15 May, Axis command was showing signs of confusion. It was erroneously believed that the offensive involved more than 100 tanks, and repeated requests were made to both the Luftwaffe and the Regia Aeronautica for a concerted effort to defeat it. Forces around Tobruk were redeployed east of the besieged city, to block any attempt at relief and to prevent the garrison from breaking out to meet the British advance. Lieutenant-Colonel Hans Cramer was sent to reinforce Kampfgruppe von Herff with a tank battalion from Panzer Regiment 8 and a battery of 88 mm (3.46 in) anti-aircraft guns, and additional reinforcements under General Hans-Karl Freiherr von Esebeck were despatched the following day.

The Germans concentrated their riposte against the central column. Herff—who had been prepared to fall back—instead launched a local counter-attack toward Fort Capuzzo during the afternoon of 15 May with the 2nd Battalion Panzer Regiment 5. At around 13:30, D Company 1DLI at the landing ground was overrun, and with no anti-tank support more capable than the Boys anti-tank rifle, the remaining troops of 1DLI were forced to fall back toward Musaid. A fortuitous dust cloud aided their withdrawal but by 14:45 Panzer Regiment 5 was reporting that it had recaptured Capuzzo, inflicting heavy casualties on the British and taking 70 prisoners.

On the desert flank, A Squadron 2nd RTR's patrol toward Sidi Azeiz was being monitored by Panzer Regiment 5, but the Germans misidentified the light cruiser tanks as heavily armoured Matilda infantry tanks, and reported that an attack was not possible. Herff—believing the British had two divisions operating in the area—had grown uneasy. A Squadron's patrol was interpreted as an attempt to concentrate south of Sidi Azeiz, in preparation for a thrust north the next day; such a move threatened to sweep aside Herff's force and unhinge the German front in the Sollum–Bardia area. Herff broke contact with the British; his plan was to join up with Cramer's Panzer Regiment 8 to mount a concentrated counter-attack the following morning.

=== British withdrawal ===
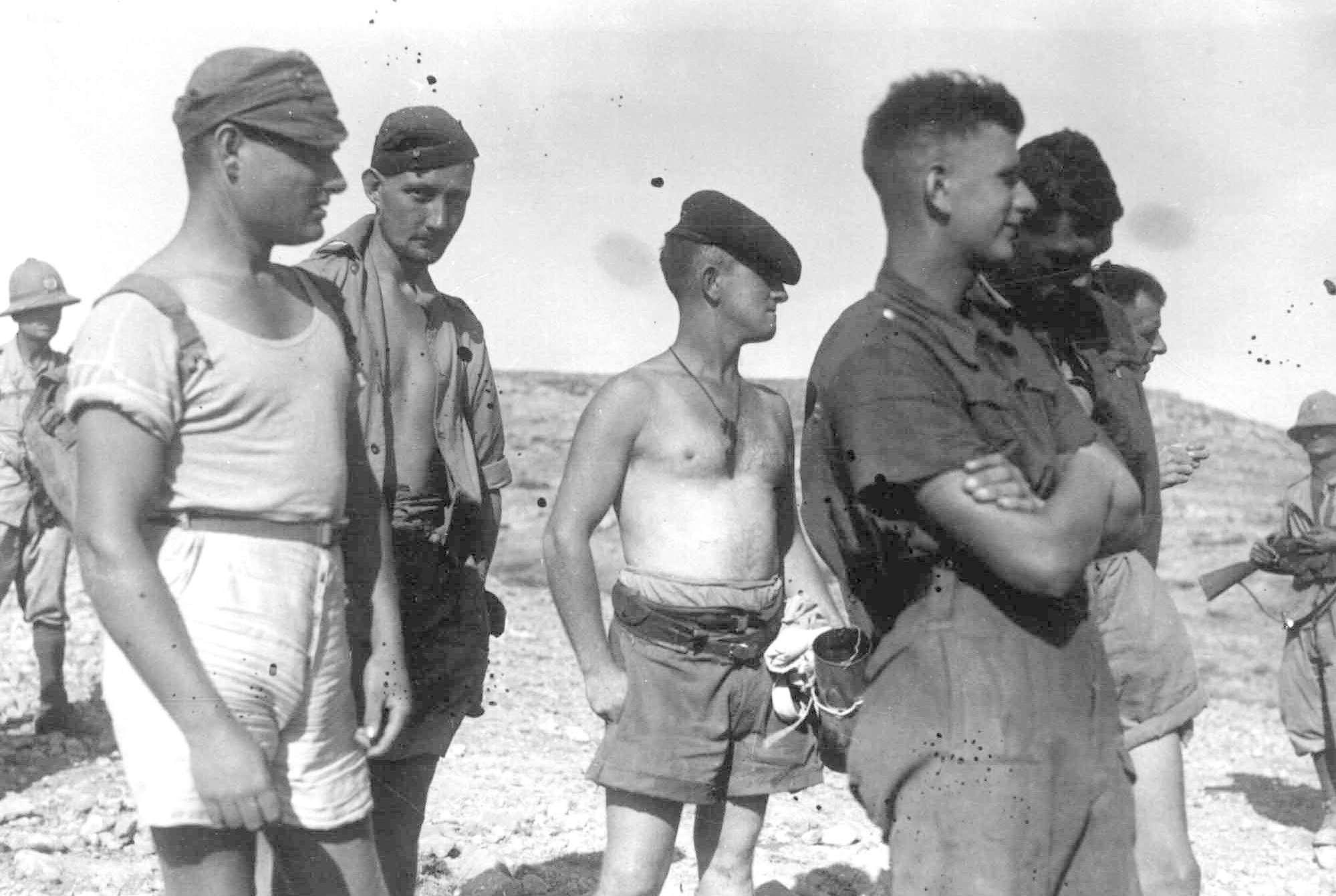
British troops captured by the Italians

Realising that the 22nd Guards Brigade group would be vulnerable to German armoured counterattacks in the open ground around Bir Wair and Mussaid, Brigadier Gott withdrew it during the early hours of the morning of 16 May. By 10:00, the infantry had taken up new positions back at Halfaya Pass, although the 7th Armoured Brigade group was ordered to remain west of Fort Capuzzo for the time being.

Cramer's reinforcements arrived in the Sidi Azeiz area at 03:00 and reached Fort Capuzzo at 06:30. At around 08:00, he made contact with Kampfgruppe von Herff but by mid-morning both groups had run out of fuel. The German advance resumed at 16:00 before being stopped by around 17 tanks of 2nd RTR. The British reported one German tank set alight and another disabled and that an advance of up to fifty tanks had been halted, while the Germans believed that they had repulsed a strong British tank attack. As nightfall approached, Herff broke off the action and went on to the defensive. He intended to repair his damaged machines, reorganise, and resume offensive operations on 18 May. 2nd RTR pulled back to Bir el Khireigat, initially followed by two German tanks, one of which withdrew after the other was destroyed. The regiment arrived at Bir el Khireigat, from where it had set out two days previously, at around 02:30 on 17 May.

== Aftermath ==
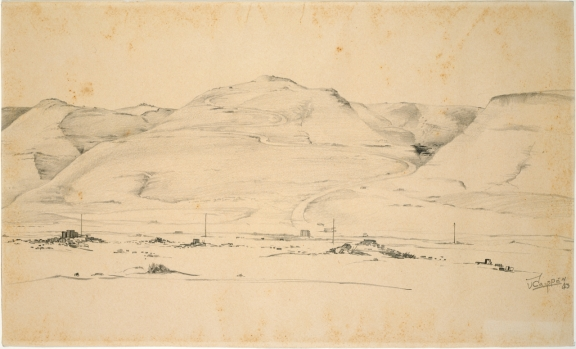
Pencil drawing of Halfaya Pass by New Zealand artist, Jack Crippen

Operation Brevity failed to achieve most of its objectives, succeeding only in retaking the Halfaya Pass. The British lost five tanks destroyed and a further 13 damaged, but the tank regiments suffered no losses in personnel. Total casualties amounted to at least 206 men. The 1st Durham Light Infantry suffered the most during the operation losing 196 men killed, wounded or captured. The 2nd Scots Guards lost one man killed and four wounded, the 3rd Coldstream Guards lost one man killed and the 11th Hussars suffered four men wounded. Losses among the 2nd Rifle Brigade are unknown. German casualties numbered three tanks (a Panzer II and two Panzer IIIs, although several more suffered minor damage) and 258 men killed, wounded or captured. Jack Greene and Alessandro Massignani place total Italian losses at 395. Allied accounts record the capture of 347 of these men.

On 5 August, Herff praised the Bersaglieri, who had defended Halfaya Pass "...with lionlike courage until the last man against stronger enemy forces. The greatest part of them died faithful to the flag". Lieutenant Giacinto Cova, a platoon commander in the 8th Bersaglieri Regiment, received a posthumous Gold Medal of Military Valour, Italy's highest award for bravery. The medal citation reported that Cova had organised a counter-attack and was killed attempting to throw a hand-held bomb at a British tank. The British received plaudits from Winston Churchill, who sent a telegram to Wavell betraying his ignorance of events by stating: "Without using the Tiger cubs you have taken the offensive, advanced 30 mi (48 km), captured Halfaya and Sollum, taken 500 German prisoners and inflicted heavy losses in men and tanks. For this twenty I tanks and 1,000 or 1,500 casualties do not seem too heavy a cost." Churchill ended the message by asking Wavell "What are your dates for bringing Tiger cubs into action?", in reference to the reinforcements that had arrived at Alexandria on 12 May as part of a convoy code-named Operation Tiger. The 11th Hussar's regimental history notes that "it was clear that no further offensive action would be possible before 7[th] Armoured Division was fully prepared". The Tiger convoy brought 238 tanks and made it possible to refit the 7th Armoured Division, which had been out of action since February as a result of the losses it sustained during Operation Compass. (Note: The convoy lost 57 tanks when the Empire Song struck a mine and sank but not before her crew was taken off. The tank reinforcements comprised 21 Mark VI light tanks, 82 Cruiser tanks (including 50 of the new Crusader tanks) and 135 Infantry tanks. Many of the division's personnel had also been dispersed to other tasks, meaning the division would also have to reorganise and retrain to become battle ready.) Preparations could now be made for Operation Battleaxe and the relief of Tobruk. In the system of British and Commonwealth battle honours, units that served in the Halfaya Pass area between 15 and 27 May were awarded the honour Halfaya 1941 in 1957.

The historian Thomas Jentz suggests that Brevity could have ended in victory for the British. While their tank forces were fighting ineffectively, the "gutsy" actions by 2nd RTR and their patrol toward Sidi Azeiz had convinced the Germans that the battle was lost by the evening of 15 May. Because of their failure to engage 2nd RTR late that day, several German commanders from Panzer Regiment 5, including its commanding officer, were removed from their posts after the battle. Jentz notes that a feint by the 1st and 7th RTR out of Tobruk might have caused a realignment of the Axis forces, weakening their overall position and perhaps even forcing them to give up the Sollum area.

Operation Brevity highlighted to Rommel the importance of the Halfaya Pass; whichever side held it would have a "comparatively safe route for his supplies" during offensives in the area. On 27 May, he launched Operation Skorpion, during which Herff recaptured the pass and reversed the last British territorial gain from Brevity.

== See also ==
- North African campaign timeline
- List of British military equipment of World War II
- List of German military equipment of World War II
- List of Italian military equipment in World War II
- Operation Brevity order of battle

== Bibliography ==
- Bauer, Eddy (2000) [1979]. Young, Peter (ed.). The History of World War II (rev. ed.). London: Orbis. ISBN 1-85605-552-3.
- Carver, Michael (1964). Tobruk. British Battles. London: Batsford. OCLC 231745159.
- Chant, Christopher (1986). The Encyclopedia of Code Names of World War II. London: Routledge & Kegan Paul. ISBN 0-7102-0718-2.
- Clarke, Dudley (1952). The Eleventh at War: Being the Story of the XIth Hussars (Prince Albert's Own) through the Years 1934–1945. London: Michael Joseph. OCLC 222891295.
- Erskine, David (2001) [1956]. The Scots Guards 1919–1955. Naval & Military Press. ISBN 1-84342-061-9.
- Greene, Jack; Massignani, Alessandro (1999) [1994]. Rommel's North Africa Campaign: September 1940 – November 1942. Great Campaigns (rev. ed.). Da Capo Press. ISBN 978-1-580-97018-1.
- Hastings, R. H. W. S. (1950). The Rifle Brigade in the Second World War 1939–1945. Aldershot: Gale & Polden. OCLC 6190324.
- Howard, Michael; Sparrow, John (1951). The Coldstream Guards, 1920–1946. London: Oxford University Press. OCLC 9151069.
- Jentz, Thomas L. (1998). Tank Combat in North Africa: The Opening Rounds, Operations Sonnenblume, Brevity, Skorpion and Battleaxe, February 1941 – June 1941. Atglen, PA: Schiffer. ISBN 0-7643-0226-4.
- Latimer, Jon (2001). Tobruk 1941: Rommel's Opening Move. Oxford: Osprey. ISBN 0-275-98287-4.
- Lyman, Robert (2009). The Longest Siege: Tobruk, the Battle that Saved North Africa. London: Macmillan. ISBN 978-0-230-71024-5.
- Neillands, Robin (2004). Eighth Army: From the Western Desert to the Alps, 1939–1945. John Murray. ISBN 0-7195-5647-3.
- Pitt, Barrie (2001) [1982]. Wavell's Command. The Crucible of War. Vol. I (new ed.). Weidenfeld Military. ISBN 0-304-35950-5 – via Archive Foundation.
- Playfair, Major-General I. S. O.; Stitt, Commander G. M. S.; Molony, Brigadier C. J. C. & Toomer, Air Vice-Marshal S. E. (2004) [1954]. Butler, J. R. M. (ed.). The Mediterranean and Middle East: The Early Successes Against Italy (to May 1941). History of the Second World War, United Kingdom Military Series. Vol. I (Facs. repr. Naval & Military Press, Uckfield ed.). London: HMSO. ISBN 1-84574-065-3.
- Playfair, Major-General I. S. O.; Flynn, Captain F. C.; Molony, Brigadier C. J. C. & Toomer, Air Vice-Marshal S. E. (2004) [1956]. Butler, J. R. M. (ed.). The Mediterranean and Middle East: The Germans Come to the Help of their Ally (1941). History of the Second World War, United Kingdom Military Series. Vol. II (Naval & Military Press, Uckfield ed.). HMSO. ISBN 1-84574-066-1.
- Rissik, David (2004) [1952]. The DLI at War: History of the Durham Light Infantry 1939–1945. Uckfield: Naval & Military Press. ISBN 1-84574-144-7.
- Rodger, Alexander (2003). Battle Honours of the British Empire and Commonwealth Land Forces. Marlborough: The Crowood Press. ISBN 1-86126-637-5.
- Rommel, Erwin (1982) [1953]. Liddell Hart, Basil (ed.). The Rommel Papers. Da Capo Press. ISBN 0-306-80157-4.
- "War Diaries For The 11th Hussars, (Prince Albert's Own) September 1939 To March 1946". 1941. Archived from the original on 24 April 2010.
- Ward, S. G. P.; Poett, Nigel (2005) [1963]. Faithful: The Story of the Durham Light Infantry. Uckfield: Naval & Military Press. ISBN 1-84574-147-1.
