= Operation Battleaxe =

British Army offensive during the Second World War

- Part of the Western Desert campaign of the Second World War
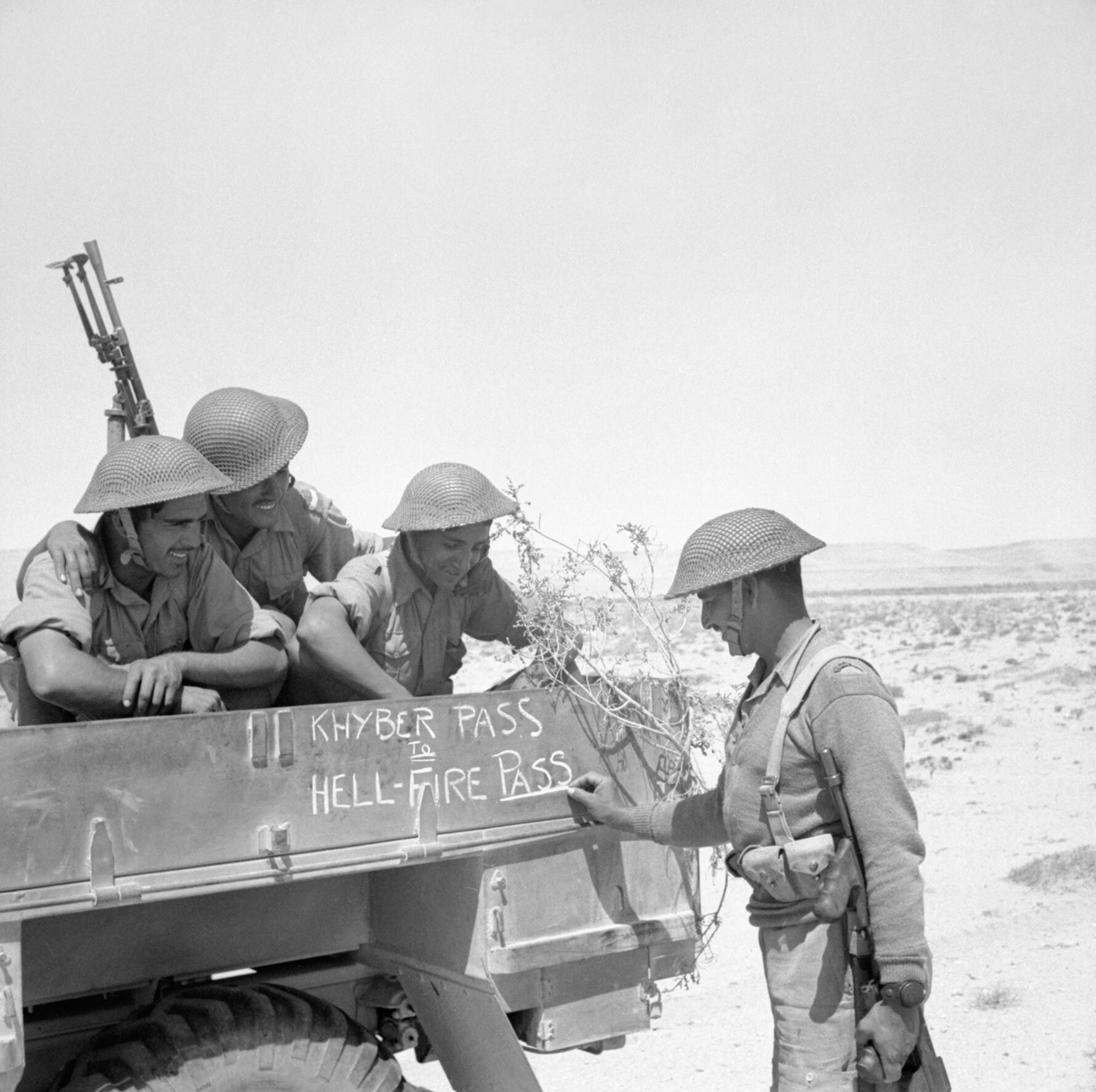
- Soldiers of the 4th Indian Division decorate the side of their lorry "Khyber Pass to Hell-Fire Pass".
Date	15–17 June 1941
Location	Cyrenaica, Libya 31°30′13″N 25°06′54″E
Result	Axis victory

Belligerents
United Kingdom; British India; Poland; Czechoslovakia	Germany; Italy

Commanders and leaders
Archibald Wavell; Noel Beresford-Peirse	Italo Gariboldi; Erwin Rommel

Strength
25,000 men 90 Cruiser tanks and c. 100 Infantry tanks 98 fighters 105 bombers	8th Panzer Regiment began with c. 100 tanks, about 50 being gun tanks; 5th Panzer Regiment had 96 tanks (57 gun tanks). 130 fighters 84 bombers (Note: 59 serviceable German bombers and dive bombers and 25 serviceable Italian bombers.); 102nd Motorized Division Trento (Note: three infantry battalions and an artillery regiment in Sollum-Mussaid-Cappuzo Area)

Casualties and losses
969 men (Note: 122 killed, 588 wounded and 259 missing); 91 to 98 tanks (Note: 27 Cruiser and 64 infantry tanks were lost due to breakdown or enemy action and were abandoned. Left behind on the battlefield: 4th RTR: 30 Infantry tanks Mk II, 1 Light tank Mk VIc; 7th RTR: 35 Infantry tanks Mk II, 1 Cruiser Mk I, 2 light tanks Mk VIc; 2nd RTR: 12 cruisers; 6th RTR: 16 Cruiser Mk VI; 7th Armoured Brigade HQ: 1 Cruiser Mk II.); 36 aircraft (Note: 33 fighters, 3 bombers)	1,270 men (Note: 93 Germans killed, 350 wounded and 235 missing. Italian casualties: 592; the British claimed 350 Italian prisoners but had to release them during their withdrawal.); 12 tanks (Note: 5th Panzer Regiment lost 4 tanks destroyed (2 Panzer II and 2 Panzer III) and 8th Panzer Regiment lost 8 tanks destroyed (3 Panzer II, 4 Panzer III and 1 Panzer IV).); 10 aircraft

Operation Battleaxe (15–17 June 1941) was a British Army offensive during the Second World War to raise the Siege of Tobruk and re-capture eastern Cyrenaica from German and Italian forces. (Note: An earlier code-name was Operation Bruiser and it was still referred to as such in telegrams to and from London. Churchill and Rommel also called this action "The Battle of Sollum".) It was the first time during the war that a significant German force fought on the defensive. The British lost over half of their tanks on the first day and only one of three attacks succeeded.

The British achieved mixed results on the second day, being pushed back on their western flank and repulsing a big German counter-attack in the centre. On the third day, the British narrowly avoided disaster by withdrawing just ahead of a German encircling movement. The failure of Battleaxe led to the replacement of British General Sir Archibald Wavell, commander-in-chief Middle East, by Claude Auchinleck; Wavell took Auchinleck's position as commander-in-chief, India.

== Background ==
=== Unternehmen Sonnenblume/Operation Sunflower ===
In late March 1941, soon after the arrival of the Afrika Korps in Tripoli, Libya to reinforce the Italians, the Axis forces quickly captured the British front line position at El Agheila and by mid-April, had reached as far as Sallum, Egypt. The British held the fortified port of Tobruk, which was besieged by the Axis. Having been informed by General Wavell that the Western Desert Force was vastly inferior to the Axis forces now in Africa, Churchill ordered that a convoy of tanks and Hawker Hurricanes, Operation Tiger (Convoy WS 58), be sailed through the Mediterranean instead of around the Cape of Good Hope to cut forty days off the journey. (Note: The convoy comprised five 15 kn (17 mph; 28 km/h) merchant ships, Clan Chattan, Clan Lamont, Clan Campbell, Empire Song and New Zealand Star. The ships carried 295 tanks and 53 Hurricane fighters.)

=== Tobruk ===
The German Armed Forces High Command (Oberkommando der Wehrmacht) sent General Friedrich Paulus to Africa to investigate the situation. On 12 May, Paulus, after witnessing one of Rommel's failed attempts to assault Tobruk, sent a report to OKW describing Rommel's position as weak, with critical shortages of both fuel and ammunition. With Operation Barbarossa imminent, Field Marshal Walther von Brauchitsch, commander-in-chief of the German Army, ordered Rommel not to advance further or attack Tobruk again.

=== Operation Brevity ===
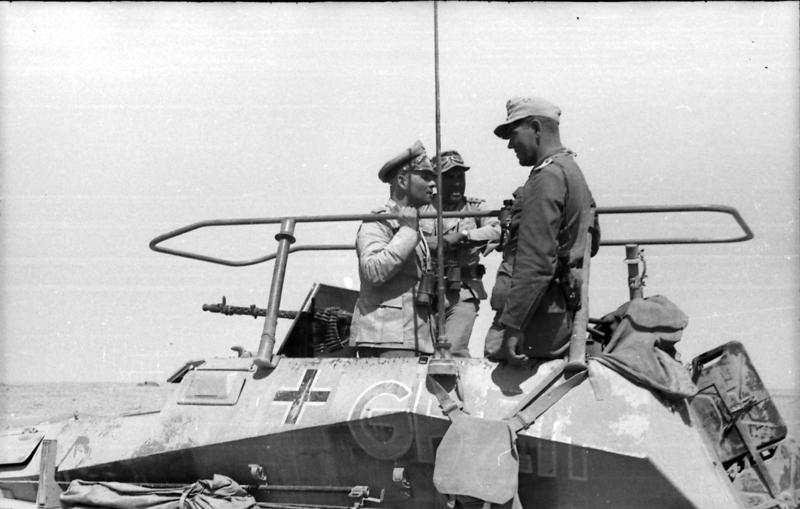
Erwin Rommel in his command halftrack, Sd.Kfz. 250/3.

Through Ultra intercepts, the British also received the report by Paulus. Churchill, believing that one strong push would dislodge German forces, began to increase the pressure on Wavell to attack. Operation Brevity was quickly planned as a limited operation to seize Sollum, Halfaya Pass and Fort Capuzzo, then advance on Sidi Aziz and Tobruk. The operation was to continue as far as supply would allow but not risk the forces committed; the objective was to destroy as much Axis equipment as possible and secure a foothold for the larger Operation Battleaxe, once the new tanks were made available. Brevity began on 15 May and Fort Capuzzo and Halfaya Pass were captured but next day William Gott, concerned that his 22nd Guards Brigade would be destroyed if caught in the open by Germans tanks, decided to pull almost the entire force back to Halfaya Pass. The operation ended on 17 May, with only the Halfaya Pass captured. The pass was retaken by a small German force on 27 May, in Operation Skorpion.

=== Greece and Crete ===
By the end of May, the Greek island of Crete had been captured in the Battle of Crete, providing the Luftwaffe with more airfields from which to attack Allied shipping and protect their supply convoys and troops in Cyrenaica; delaying Battleaxe could mean stronger Axis opposition. The British Chiefs of Staff stated that it was imperative that control be wrested in the area between Sollum and Derna and British air power be re-established there.

== Prelude ==
=== Tiger Convoy ===
On 12 May, the Tiger convoy arrived in Alexandria with 238 tanks and 43 Hurricanes consisting of 21 Light Tank Mk VI, 82 Cruiser tanks (including fifty of the new Crusader tanks) and 135 Matilda II Infantry tanks. There were delays in unloading the tanks, which also had to be adapted for desert use, so Battleaxe was postponed until 10 June. The tanks were intended for the 7th Armoured Division, which had been out of action since February, after most of its tanks had worn out during Operation Compass.

=== British plan ===
The contested frontier area of Operation Battleaxe.

On 28 May, Wavell gave his orders for Operation Battleaxe, an operation in three stages; the Axis forces were to be defeated on the frontier and the area of Halfaya, Sollum, Capuzzo and Sidi Aziez was to be secured. In the second phase, XIII Corps was to secure the area around Tobruk and El Adem, then the areas of Derna and Mechili were to be captured. The plan was based on intelligence information, which incorrectly indicated that 2/3 of the German tank strength was at Tobruk, which would put the British at a decisive material advantage on the frontier. The attack was originally scheduled for 7 June, but was pushed back at the insistence of General O'Moore Creagh, whose squadrons did not receive their tanks until 9 June. The new date was 15 June, giving Creagh five days for additional training.

In the first stage, the British would advance in a three-prong assault to clear the frontier region. Along the coast was Coast Force and inland was Escarpment Force. The former was responsible for capturing Halfaya Pass, while the latter was to capture the remainder of the frontier at Fort Capuzzo, Musaid and Sollum. The 7th Armoured Brigade Group and the artillery of the Support Group were to engage and destroy the German tanks, which were thought to be at Hafid Ridge. This would also trap Axis units on the frontier between themselves and the remainder of the British forces. After capturing the frontier, the brigades of the 7th Armoured Division would reform and continue north to relieve Tobruk. Once joined by the Tobruk garrison, the combined forces would press on to the west, driving the Germans as far back as possible.

Three days prior to the start of Battleaxe, to help soften the Axis forces, the Royal Air Force was to bomb Benghazi while all aircraft capable of ground attack were to bomb Axis movement on the frontier. Once the battle began, fighters were to patrol defensively over Allied ground forces, while medium bombers were to stand by to engage Axis columns. Such was the priority on Battleaxe that Arthur Tedder (air officer commander-in-chief, Middle East) was instructed by the Chiefs of Staff to accept significant risks in other theatres by diverting all possible air support for it. Beresford-Peirse and Tedder established headquarters well to the rear, at Sidi Barrani and Maaten Baggush. Beresford-Peirse chose Sidi Barrani as, even though it was more than a five-hour drive from the battlefield, it was equipped with the most advanced airfield for reconnaissance aircraft and was also the most forward position from which communications could be maintained with Maaten Baggush.

=== Axis preparations ===
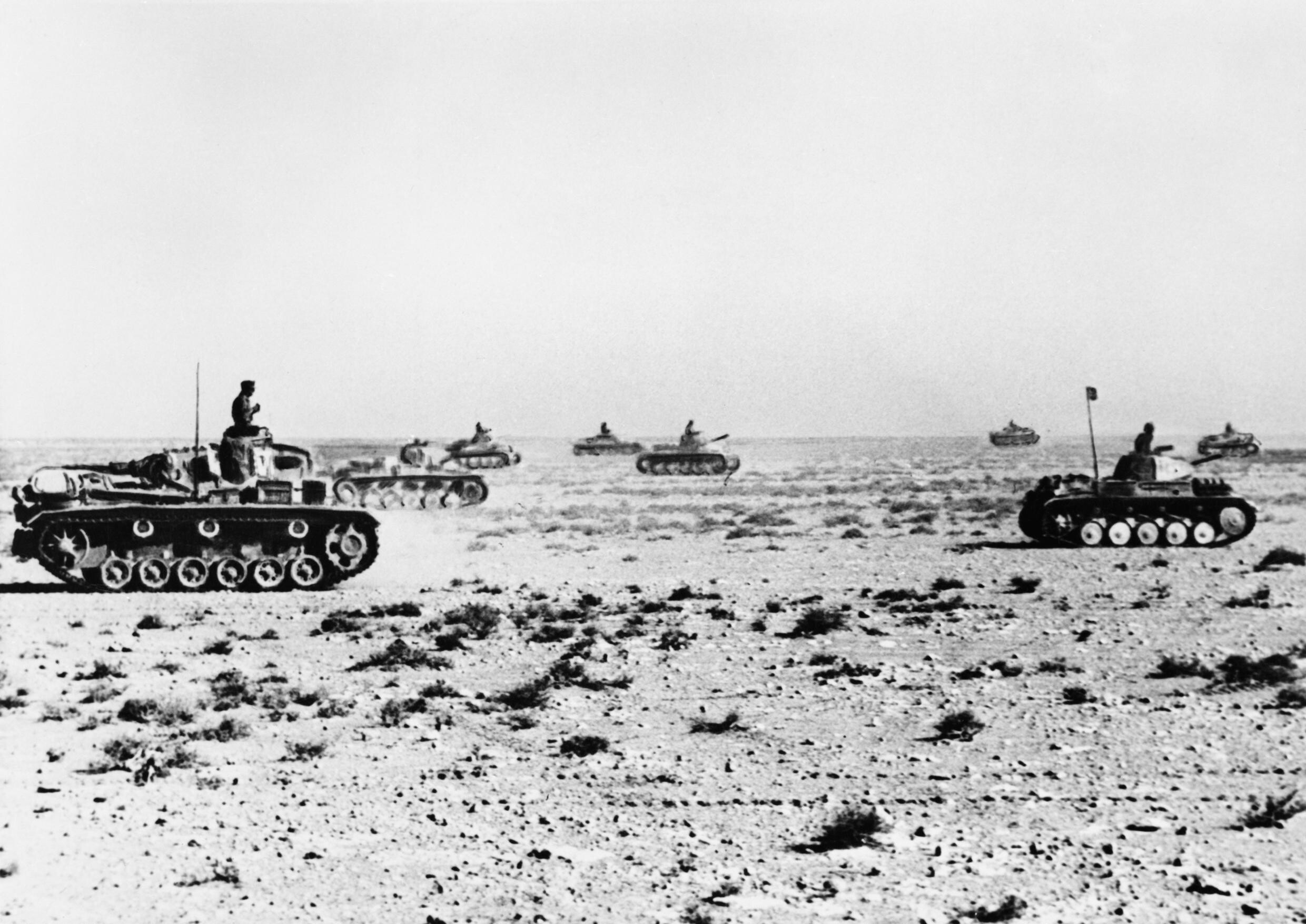
German tanks advance in the desert shortly before the Battle of Sollum.

Though Brevity had failed to yield any territory to the British, it showed Rommel that his front line defences were quite easy to breach. Anticipating further British attacks, the Axis forces created a line of fortified positions from Halfaya to Sidi Aziz, placing a number of anti-tank guns and anti-tank mines on the Halfaya Pass, Point 206 (south of Forth Capuzzo) and on Point 208 (west of Fort Capuzzo on the Hafid Ridge). The primary responsibility of the frontier defence was charged to the 15th Panzer Division, which had received a new commander, General Walter Neumann-Silkow, on 8 June. Poor signals security in the 7th Armoured Division gave Rommel nine hours notice of the operation. Rommel sent the 5th Light Division to the south of Tobruk, ready to use it against either the Sollum area or on Tobruk and ordered a big artillery bombardment of Tobruk the night before the operation, to prevent the Allied garrison from breaking out.

Unfortunately, our petrol stocks were badly depleted, and it was with some anxiety that we contemplated the coming British attack, for we knew that our moves would be decided more by the petrol gauge than by tactical requirements.

— Rommel

== Battle ==
=== 15 June ===
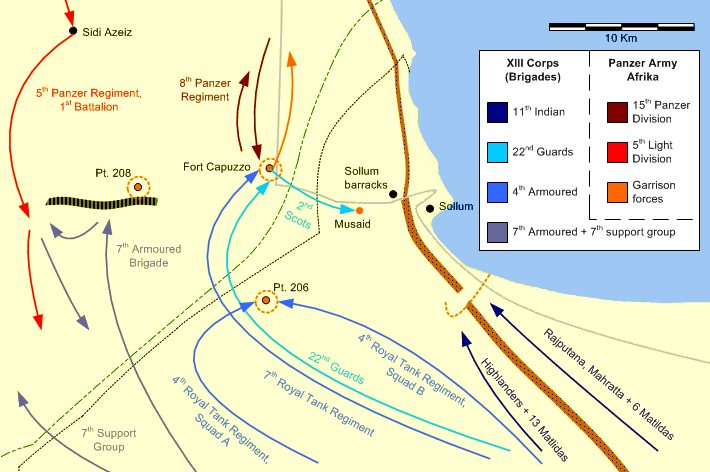
The first day of Operation Battleaxe

For the RAF, everything went according to plan on the first day. Axis supply columns and airfields had been hit repeatedly up to the start of the attack and once the operation began, and British columns were able to move unmolested from their starting points at Sofafi and Buq-Buq to their destinations covered by RAF fighters. Axis aircraft managed only six attacks that day. On the eastern side, at 05:15, Coast Force—commanded by Brigadier Reginald Savory and charged with capturing Halfaya Pass, started to move on to their objective. On the escarpment was the Halfaya Group, composed of the 2nd Battalion Queen's Own Cameron Highlanders, the 13 tanks (twelve Matildas and one light tank) of C Squadron, 4th Royal Tank Regiment (which had captured Halfaya Pass during Operation Brevity) and an artillery battery from the 31st Field Regiment. To their east and below the lip of the escarpment were the 1st Battalion 6th Rajputana Rifles and 2nd Battalion 5th Mahratta Light Infantry, two troops of A Squadron, 4th Royal Tank Regiment and a few 25-pounder guns.

At 05:40, British artillery for the Halfaya Group was scheduled to open fire on the German and Italian forces in Halfaya, to cover the tanks and infantry but the battery had become bogged down by soft sand. After waiting until 06:00, 15 minutes after the fighting began to the west below the escarpment, the commander of C Squadron ordered his tanks to attack at the top of the pass; soon after, the anti-tank guns of the defenders opened fire and within a few hours all but one light tank and one of the Matildas had been destroyed, including Miles' own. The Cameron Highlanders were soon driven back by a detachment of German armoured cars and motorised infantry. Below the escarpment four of the Matildas were disabled by anti-tank mines which were supposed to have been cleared; this blocked the path of the remaining two and reduced the small tank force to acting in a pillbox capacity. The Rajputana Rifles and Mahrattas made several attempts to reach the pass but were repelled each time; the former lost their commanding officer in the final attack.

In the centre, the 7th Royal Tank Regiment reached Fort Capuzzo by noon and scattered the defenders, who retreated north to join the 15th Panzer Division, between them and Bardia. Soon afterwards, they faced several counter-attacks by a battalion from the 8th Panzer Regiment of the 15th Panzer Division. After being joined by the 22nd Guards Brigade, they faced the final and largest counter-attack at 18:30 but managed to repulse it. These were not serious assaults, as Rommel would not commit the 15th Panzer Division to battle without more information on the situation. The 8th Panzer Regiment skirmished briefly and then feigned a disorderly retreat to lure Matilda tanks into a chase into range of concealed anti-tank guns. Neither side took much damage from these actions. In response to the British capture of Capuzzo and concerned with a possible attack on Sollum and Bardia, Rommel ordered the 5th Light Division to Sidi Azeiz ready for a possible counter-attack.

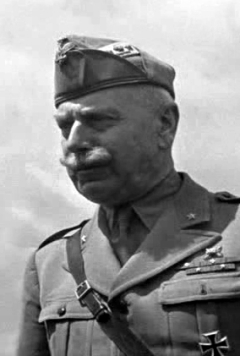
Italo Gariboldi

The rest of the 4th Royal Tank Regiment had been used as a flank guard for the 7th Royal Tank Regiment. While B Squadron was kept in reserve, the three remaining troops of A Squadron (12 tanks) had initial success against Battle Position (B.P.) 38, capturing 200 Axis prisoners and eight field guns with virtually no loss. These gains were lost when A Squadron were repelled at Point 206 and German forces counter-attacked at B.P. 38. In the evening, after A Squadron was down to only one remaining tank, the sixteen tanks of B Squadron were brought into action and Point 206 was captured. In capturing these objectives, the British also took over 500 German and Italian prisoners. That night, the 2nd Scots Guards—a battalion of the 22nd Guards Brigade—were able to advance further eastward and capture an outpost at Musaid.

On the western side, the 7th Armoured Brigade had placed the 2nd Royal Tank Regiment, equipped with older cruiser tanks, in front of the 6th Royal Tank Regiment to use their new Crusader tanks as a surprise. The force reached Hafid Ridge (which actually consisted of three ridges) by about 09:00. After 2nd Royal Tank Regiment had crossed over the first ridge, they were attacked at near point-blank range by dug in anti-tank guns, destroying two A9 cruiser tanks before the rest could retreat. This development posed a serious problem for the brigade, as the cruiser tanks were armed with 2-pounder anti-tank guns which lacked the High Explosive (HE) rounds needed to engage infantry and artillery. Artillery support was not available as it was attached to the Support Group in the south-west, was covering the 7th Armoured Brigade's flank.

It was decided to attempt a flanking attack while waiting for the artillery to arrive. A small force of tanks from the 2nd Royal Tank Regiment was sent to the western part of the Hafid Ridge, with orders to turn into the first valley. The attack went well at first, as the tanks caught the Axis forces unaware and were able to strafe along their trenches with their machine guns, losing only one tank in the process. As they approached point 208 on their way eastwards, the commander became aware of its fortifications and ordered his units to disengage; due to an equipment shortage, only one tank per troop was equipped with a radio and five of his tanks, not receiving the order, continued towards Point 208 and were destroyed by its 88 mm guns.

Soon, reports came in from Allied aircraft that German tanks were approaching and the order was given to clear the ridges to use the advantageous terrain for the upcoming tank battle. At 17:30 reports came in from forward observers that the defenders were withdrawing from Hafid Ridge. After clearing the first ridge, it looked as though the reports were accurate, as German trucks and towed guns were seen moving away over the second crest. Pursuit began but upon the British forces clearing the second ridge, the Axis forces sprung their trap and fired on the Crusader tanks at near point-blank range; within minutes, 11 of the Crusaders were destroyed and six more heavily damaged. The Axis infantry and anti-tank guns, bereft of entrenchments, also took significant casualties. Over thirty German tanks from a battalion of the 5th Panzer Regiment, part of the 5th Light Division which had earlier been stationed north at Sidi Azeiz, were seen arriving from the west.

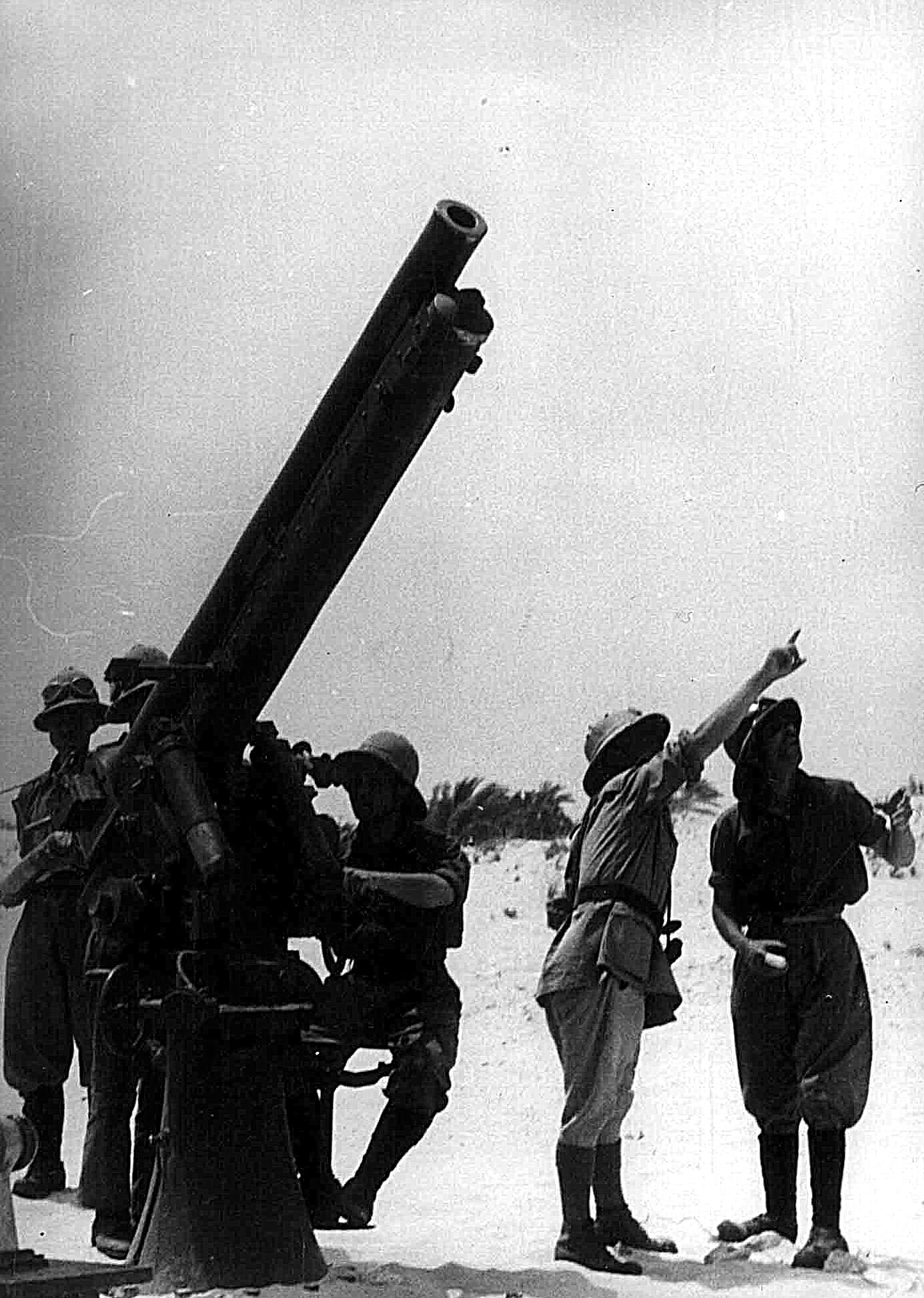
Defence of Fort Capuzzo by Italian anti-aircraft gunners

By the end of the first day, Fort Capuzzo had been captured but not Halfaya Pass and Hafid Ridge and the British had lost a significant number of tanks. In the 7th Armoured Brigade, the 2nd Royal Tank Regiment was down to 28 cruiser tanks and the 6th Royal Tank Regiment to only 20 of their 50 Crusaders; many of the tanks which had been damaged, were abandoned in the field as the 7th Armoured Brigade withdrew from Hafid Ridge, leaving them for seizure by German tank recovery teams. The 4th Armoured Brigade, from its original strength of roughly 100 Matildas, was down to 37 (though 11 more were repaired by the following morning). German panzer losses were trifling, though there had been many casualties among the garrisons at Hafid Ridge, Point 206 and Fort Capuzzo. Beresford-Peirse planned to have the 11th Infantry Brigade continue its attack next day on Halfaya Pass, the 22nd Guards Brigade to hold their position and for the 4th Armoured Brigade to reinforce the 7th Armoured Brigade for a combined attack on the outnumbered 5th Light Division.

Through the wireless intelligence service, Rommel had a fairly clear picture of the British situation, including their losses, problems and the new orders issued by Beresford-Peirse. Rommel was concerned for the forces at Halfaya Pass, which were trapped by the 22nd Guards Brigade on one side and the 11th Infantry Brigade on the other and running low on supplies. His plan was to have the 5th Light Division, which by midnight had almost fully reached Sidi Azeiz, drive south towards Sidi Omar and then east towards Sidi Suleiman and then north-east to Halfaya Pass, approaching the 11th Infantry Brigade from the rear. To prevent the re-deployment of Matildas, either to reinforce the 7th Armoured Brigade as Beresford-Peirse planned or to assist the British forces at Halfaya, Neumann-Silkow was ordered to attack Capuzzo. He ordered the attacks to begin while still dark, as the British intended to start their operations shortly after dawn.

=== 16 June ===
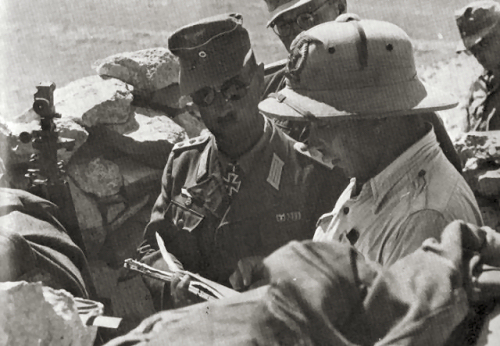
Bach in an Italian battery position, Halfaya Pass

The 11th Infantry Brigade renewed their attack on Halfaya Pass, but met with same failure as the day prior. Bach's forces—though outnumbered and running low on supplies—were now totally surrounded, and thus could not retreat even if they were inclined to do so. Messervy saw this lack of progress and disregarded Beresford-Peirse's orders to release his tanks and decided to retain the few remaining Matildas he had until some breach of the Axis defences could be made. Neumann-Silkow began his attack on British held Fort Capuzzo at 06:00. He organised the 80 tanks under his command into two columns and attacked Capuzzo from either side. The attack went poorly from the onset, as the 15th Panzer Division ran directly into heavy artillery from 25-pounders which had been brought up during the night and Matilda tanks in entrenched positions. By 10:00, the 15th Panzer Division had lost fifty of its tanks, and by 12:00, they were forced to withdraw. Soon after the German forces withdrew the Scots Guards advanced further west, capturing the Sollum barracks to prevent Axis forces from either flanking on the east or linking up with the Halfaya garrison.

Starting at dawn, the 5th Light Division began to advance southwards past the western edge of Hafid Ridge. The 7th Armoured Brigade kept pace with them to the east, joined by the 7th Support Group as the two forces approached Sidi Omar. During the running skirmish, the British tanks had a few successful attacks against unarmoured German transport vehicles, but they found themselves at a significant disadvantage when they engaged the panzers, who utilised an extremely effective tactic against them. The Panzer IVs, armed with high-explosive 75 mm (2.95 in) guns with an effective range of ~2750 m, would open fire while still well out of the roughly 460 m (500 yd) range of the 2-pounder guns found on British tanks. While this would do minimal damage to the British tanks, it decimated their towed 25-pounder artillery, which would be forced to withdraw. Without British artillery to concern them, the Panzer IV and 50 mm (1.97 in) gun armed Panzer IIIs could then safely close range with their British counterparts and pick off the thinly armed cruiser tanks while still remaining beyond the range of the British tank guns. If the British tanks attempted to move forward to engage the panzers, the latter would quickly retreat behind a screen of anti-tank guns while lighter armoured elements would begin to move around the British flanks. To make matters worse for the 7th Armoured Brigade, they suffered numerous breakdowns. By evening, both regiments of the 7th Armoured Brigade had retreated east of the Frontier Wire and the 7th Support Group and withdrawn even further. At 19:00, just as dusk fell, the 5th Light Division further weakened the 7th Armoured Brigade with an attack which only ended when night fell.

Rommel—who had seen several of the engagements between the 7th Armoured Brigade and 5th Light Division—decided to attempt a full thrust against the 7th Armoured Brigade. At 16:00, he ordered the 15th Panzer Division to leave only minimal elements at its position north of Fort Capuzzo and make all haste to the northern flank of the 5th Light Division, which was pressing eastward to Sidi Suleiman. He hoped to cut off the majority of the British forces, encircling and then eliminating them. During the afternoon, Wavell had flown to Beresford-Peirse, to simplify the making of decisions. When he arrived, Beresford-Peirse was away, meeting with Messervy and Creagh, where he reconfirmed his orders for the infantry to maintain its attack on Halfaya and hold Capuzzo, while the 4th Armoured Brigade was to join the 7th Armoured Brigade, to confront the 5th Light Division to the west. That night, on learning of the 5th Light Division advance, Messervy took the initiative and ordered his forces to withdraw and ordered the remaining Matildas of the 4th Armoured Brigade to form a screen, to protect the retreating infantry from the advance of the panzers to the west. The 7th Armoured Brigade had lost more than half of the cruiser tanks operational in the morning and was down to 21 runners. The 4th Armoured Brigade had been reduced to 17 Matildas.

=== 17 June ===
At 04:30, Rommel's panzers began their advance. The 5th Light Division encountered the 7th Armoured Brigade at 06:00 and began pushing them back. By 08:00 that morning, they had reached Sidi Suleiman. At Capuzzo, the early morning movements of the 15th Panzer Division led Messervy to believe another attack was imminent, and he thus cancelled Beresford-Peirse's orders for the 4th Armoured Brigade to reinforce the 7th so that they could be retained. The combination of the two events caused serious alarm to Creagh, who then sent a message to Beresford-Peirse, requesting his presence for instruction; Wavell, who was with Beresford-Peirse, took command of the operation and boarded a plane to Creagh's command post at Halfway House. This message was also intercepted by the Germans, as Rommel later wrote,

It sounded suspiciously as though the British commander no longer felt himself capable of handling the situation. It being now obvious that in their present bewildered state the British would not start anything for the time being, I decided to pull the net tight by going on to Halfaya.

— Rommel

The 5th Light Division and the 15th Panzer Division, attacking from the south-west and north-west respectively, were only 9 mi (14 km) from Halfaya. At 10:00, as the Panzer divisions pushed eastward, they ran into the remaining Matildas of the 4th Armoured Brigade, joined on the flank by the remaining cruisers and artillery of the 7th Armoured Brigade and 7th Support Group. The tanks formed a screen to protect the 22nd Guards Brigade and 11th Indian Infantry Brigade as they retreated toward Halfway House. At 10:45, Messervy contacted Creagh over the radio and, speaking Hindustani for security, informed him that he had ordered a retreat of his infantry from Capuzzo and Halfaya, to begin at 11:00. At noon, Wavell and Beresford-Peirse arrived at Halfway House and learned of the retreat, to which Wavell then gave his approval. The British armour stalled the panzer advance to Halfaya until 16:00, by which time the 22nd Guards had escaped.

== Aftermath ==
=== Analysis ===
Churchill was displeased with the results of Operation Battleaxe. He had been expecting nothing less than complete success and had instead received news that the operation had failed and the tanks sent for it had been lost. Churchill sacked Wavell but could not have it look as though he was being punished or have Wavell return to England, as embarrassing questions could be raised. Churchill had Wavell exchange duties with General Claude Auchinleck, Commander-in-Chief, India. Along with Wavell went Michael O'Moore Creagh, who was replaced by Gott.

Beresford-Peirse was criticised for both his plan and control of the operation and on 4 October was sent to Sudan with the position of general officer commanding, Sudan. Beresford-Peirse took the place of William Platt, who had been promoted to commander-in-chief of the newly created East Africa Command. Beresford-Peirse was replaced as commander of XIII Corps by Lieutenant-general Reade Godwin-Austen, who had been promoted from command of the 12th (African) Division in the East African Campaign.

=== Casualties ===
The Allies had 969 casualties, with 122 killed, 588 wounded and 259 missing. The Germans had 678 casualties, with 93 killed, 350 wounded and 235 missing and the Italians suffered 592 casualties. The British lost 98 tanks (3 light, 30 cruisers and 65 Matildas) and the Axis had roughly 50 disabled, excluding tanks which had been knocked out and repaired during the battle. The Axis held the battlefield and recovered disabled vehicles; only 12 tanks were written off. The British lost 33 fighters and three bombers against 10 German aircraft. RAF fighter losses were caused by lack of pilot training and the need for continuous air cover; standing patrols could only be maintained by a few aircraft while the bulk were in transit to the battlefield, being repaired, rearmed and refuelled.

== Orders of battle ==
=== Allied forces ===
- Western Desert Force (Lieutenant-general Noel Beresford-Peirse)
  - 4th Indian Infantry Division (Major-general Frank Messervy)
    - 22nd Guards Brigade (Note: The 4th Indian Infantry Division had the 11th Indian Infantry Brigade, the 5th Indian Infantry Brigade and 7th Indian Infantry Brigade, were in Syria and East Africa. The 22nd Guards Brigade and 4th Armoured Brigade were under command.)
  - 7th Armoured Division (Major-general Sir Michael O'Moore Creagh) (Note: The 7th Armoured Division had the 7th Armoured Brigade and 7th Support Group. The 4th Armoured Brigade armoured battalions were detached to Coast Force and Escarpment Force.)

==== Coast Force ====
- 7th Armoured Brigade Group
  - 7th Armoured Brigade (4 × A10 Cruiser tanks with brigade HQ)
    - 2nd Royal Tank Regiment (10 × A9, 11 × A10, 21 × A13 Mk II Cruiser tanks)
    - 6th Royal Tank Regiment (53 × Crusader I)
    - 3rd Hussars (16 × Mk VIb light tanks)
  - 7th Support Group
    - 1st The King's Royal Rifle Corps
    - 2nd The Rifle Brigade
    - 3rd Regiment Royal Horse Artillery
    - 4th Regiment Royal Horse Artillery
    - 1st Light Anti-Aircraft Regiment, Royal Artillery

==== Escarpment Force ====
  - 22nd Guards Brigade
    - 2nd Scots Guards
    - 3rd Coldstream Guards
    - 1st The Buffs
  - 4th Armoured Brigade (2 × A10 Cruiser tanks with brigade HQ )
    - 4th Royal Tank Regiment (44 × Matilda II Infantry tanks, 6 × Mk VIb light tanks)
    - 7th Royal Tank Regiment (48 × Matilda II Infantry tanks, 6 × Mk VIb light tanks)

==== Coast Force ====
  - Halfaya Group
    - 2nd Queen's Own Cameron Highlanders
    - C Squadron, 4th RTR (12 × Matilda II Infantry tanks)
  - 11th Indian Infantry Brigade Group
    - 1st/6th Rajputana Rifles
    - 2nd/5th Mahratta Light Infantry
    - Two troops from A Squadron, 4RTR (6 × Matilda II Infantry tanks)

==== RAF ====
- 98 fighters in six squadrons
- 105 bombers in eight squadrons (204 Group).

Total British strength for the operation came to 25,000 men, c. 220 tanks (28 × Light, 100 × Cruiser and 92 × Infantry). Of the cruiser tanks, 38 were older cruiser models (Mk I, II and III/IV) and 53 were the new Crusader. The Crusader and Matilda tanks were fitted with a Rotatrailer, an un-armoured trailer with 10 imperial gallons (45 L) of water and 12-man/days of rations, 100 rounds of 2-pounder ammunition and 12 imperial gallons (55 L) of lubricating oil, with 120 imperial gallons (550 L) of fuel carried in the wheels.

=== Axis forces ===
Comandante Superiore:Generale d'Armata Italo Gariboldi

Deutsches Afrika Korps (DAK) under Generalleutnant Erwin Rommel

- 5th Light Division (Generalmajor Johann von Ravenstein) was in reserve with 57 × Panzer III and Panzer IV, 39 × Panzer I and Pz II. 5th Panzer Regiment of the 5th Light Division, which had 96 tanks of which 57 were medium tanks.
- 15th Panzer Division (Generalmajor Walter Neumann-Silkow) was on the frontier. The 8th Panzer Regiment of the 15th Panzer Division had 36 × Panzer II and about 62 × Panzer III and IV. Most of the remaining units of the division were dispersed to various strong points along Rommel's defensive line.
- 62nd Infantry Regiment of the 102nd Motorised Division "Trento"; Most of the division was at Bardia but three infantry battalions and an artillery regiment were in the Sollum–Musaid–Capuzzo area.

Total Axis strength was 13,200 men (5,700 German, 7,500 Italian), ~194 tanks (75 × Panzer II, 119 × Panzer III and Panzer IV), 130 × fighters (60 × German and 70 × Italian) and 84 × bombers (59 × German, 25 × Italian).

== See also ==
- List of World War II Battles
- North African campaign timeline
- List of British military equipment of World War II
- List of German military equipment of World War II
- List of Italian military equipment in World War II
