= Noel Beresford-Peirse =

British Army officer

Lieutenant-General Sir Noel Beresford-Peirse KBE CB DSO
- Born: 22 December 1887; Ireland
- Died: 14 January 1953 (aged 65); Salisbury, Wiltshire, England
- Military career
- Allegiance: United Kingdom
- Branch: British Army
- Service years: 1907–1947
- Rank: Lieutenant-General
- Nickname: "BP"
- Service number: 4085
- Unit: Royal Artillery
- Commands: Southern Army, India (1942–1945); XV Indian Corps (1942); British Troops in Sudan & Sudan Defence Force (1941–1942); Western Desert Force (1941); 4th Indian Infantry Division (1940–1941)
- Conflicts: First World War; Second World War: Operation Compass; East African Campaign; Operation Brevity; Operation Battleaxe
- Awards: Knight Commander of the Order of the British Empire; Companion of the Order of the Bath; Distinguished Service Order; Mentioned in Despatches (3)

Lieutenant-General Sir Noel Monson de la Poer Beresford-Peirse, KBE, CB, DSO (22 December 1887 – 14 January 1953) was a British Army officer.

== Family background ==
Beresford-Peirse was the son of Colonel William John de la Poer Beresford-Peirse and Mary, daughter of Thomas Chambers of Aberfoyle, County Londonderry. He was educated at Wellington College, Berkshire and at the Royal Military Academy, Woolwich and commissioned into the Royal Artillery. Beresford-Peirse was great-grandson to Adm. John Beresford, and a cousin to the Beresford-Peirse baronets.

He was married three times. The first marriage (in 1912) was to Hazel Marjorie, daughter of J.A. Cochrane, Riverina, Australia. The marriage ended in divorce in 1924. The second marriage (in 1925) was to Jean, only child of Surgeon-Captain R.D. Jameson. Jean died in 1926. In 1929 he married Katharine Camilla, daughter of Colonel James Morris Colquhoun Colvin. All three marriages were childless.

== Military career ==
Beresford-Peirse was commissioned into the Royal Artillery in 1907.

He served in the First World War in, briefly, Egypt in 1914 then Mesopotamia back to Egypt and finally France and Belgium. He was Mentioned in Dispatches and awarded the Distinguished Service Order in 1918.

After the First World War and after attendance at the Staff College, Camberley from 1924 to 1925, until 1929, he performed a number of roles in the Royal Artillery in France and Britain. He was promoted to brevet lieutenant colonel on 1 January 1929.

There were then staff and administrative posts in the UK until 1935. In 1937, Beresford-Peirse was posted to India for "special duties" and subsequently he served two years as an instructor at the Senior Officers' School, Belgaum in India. He was Brigadier in the Royal Artillery, Southern India Command during 1939 and 1940 and aide-de-camp to King George VI in 1939 and 1940.

At the beginning of the Second World War, Beresford-Peirse was the Commander of Artillery for the Indian 4th Infantry Division, which at the time was based in Egypt. He was promoted to command the division in August 1940 and led it in North Africa (Operation Compass) and Sudan (the East African Campaign).

In March 1941 he was knighted as a Knight Commander of the Order of the British Empire and, on 14 April 1941, he was given command of the Western Desert Force (later redesignated XIII Corps). He commanded the British forces in Sudan from October 1941 to April 1942 when he was put in command of the Indian XV Corps and then, from June 1942, the Southern Army in India until 31 March 1945.

Beresford-Peirse was Welfare General of the India Command between April 1945 and 1946. He retired on 13 June 1947, joining the Regular Army Reserve of Officers, and died in 1953.

== Notes ==
Military offices
Preceded by Philip Neame	GOC 4th Indian Infantry Division; 1940–1941	Succeeded by Frank Messervy
Preceded by Richard O'Connor	GOC XIII Corps; April–September 1941	Succeeded by Reade Godwin-Austen
Preceded by William Platt	Commandant of the Sudan Defence Force; 1941–1942	Succeeded by Balfour Hutchison
Preceded by Sir Brodie Haig	GOC-in-C Southern Army, India; 1942–1945	Succeeded by Sir Rob Lockhart
