= Western Desert Force =

British Army formation active in Egypt during World War II

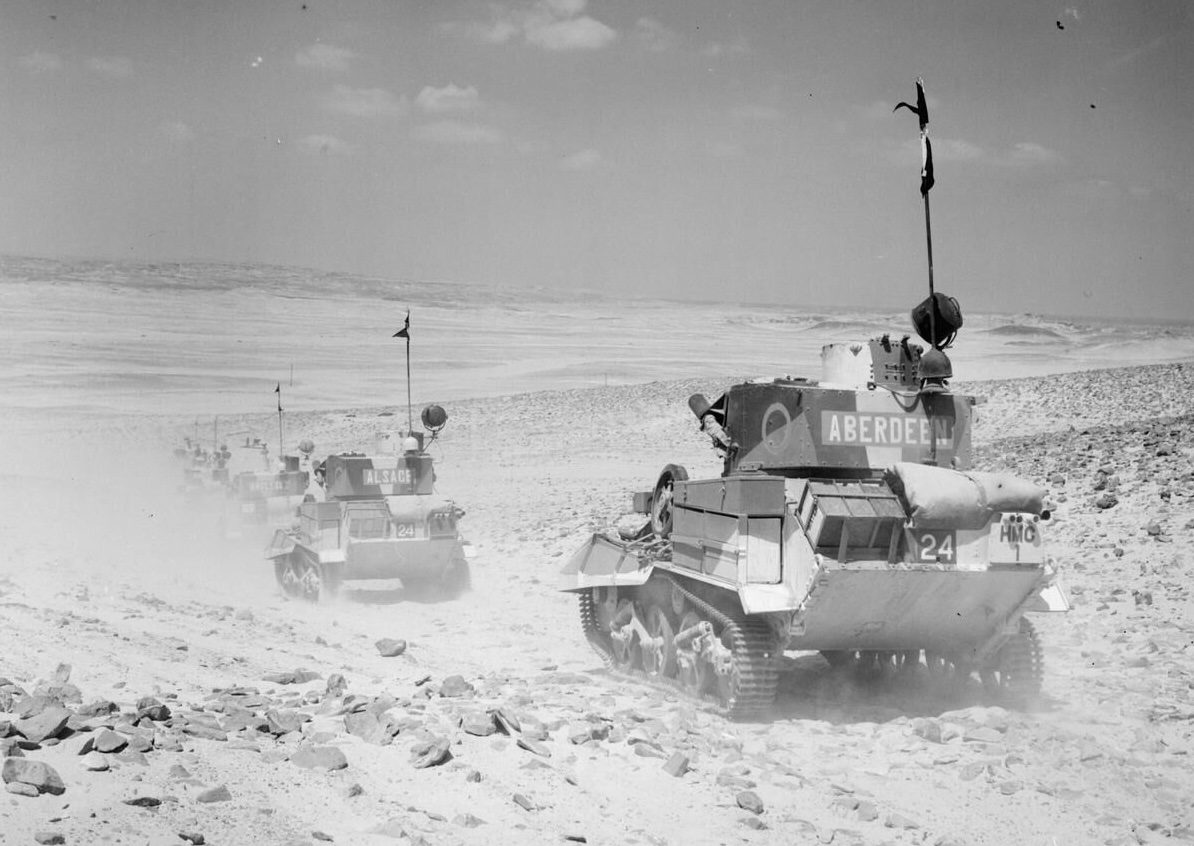
- The British Army in North Africa 1940
- Active: 17 June 1940 – 1 January 1941; 14 April 1941 – 18 September 1941
- Country: United Kingdom
- Branch: British Army
- Type: Corps
- Part of: Middle East Command
- Engagements: Western Desert Campaign

Commanders
- Notable commanders: Richard O'Connor; Noel Beresford-Peirse

The Western Desert Force (WDF) was a British Army formation active in Egypt during the Western Desert Campaign of the Second World War. On 17 June 1940, the headquarters of the British 6th Infantry Division was re-named the Western Desert Force. The formation consisted of the 7th Armoured Division and the 4th Indian Infantry Division, commanded by Major-General Richard O'Connor. In September 1940, at the time of the Italian invasion of Egypt, the Western Desert Force consisted of roughly 36,000 troops and about 65 tanks.

From early December 1940 to February 1941, during Operation Compass, the exploits of the Western Desert Force earned a parody of the Prime Minister, Winston Churchill's, famous quote, "Never has so much been owed by so many, to so few". So many Italians were captured by the Western Desert Force that Anthony Eden said, "Never has so much been surrendered by so many, to so few". From 14 December, the 6th Australian Division replaced the 4th Indian Infantry Division which was redeployed to East Africa.

The Western Desert Force was retitled XIII Corps on 1 January 1941. By February 1941, the remaining Italian forces in Cyrenaica were withdrawing down the Via Balbia with the 7th Armoured Division and the 6th Australian Infantry Division close behind. When Operation Compass came to an end with the surrender of the Italian Tenth Army the corps HQ was disbanded in February and its responsibilities taken over by HQ Cyrenaica Command (Cyrcom) a static command, reflecting the Allied defensive posture in the Western Desert as Middle East Command conentrated on the Battle of Greece in April.

After the Italian forces in North Africa had been reinforced with the Africa Korps under Erwin Rommel during Operation Sonnenblume, Lieutenant General Philip Neame, General Officer Commanding (GOC) Cyrenaica, was captured during Rommel's advance and the Western Desert Force HQ was revived on 14 April, under Major-General Noel Beresford-Peirse, to take command of British Commonwealth forces in the western desert and halt the Axis advance at the Egypt–Libya border.

In August 1941 General Archibald Wavell was replaced as Commander-in-Chief (C-in-C) Middle East by Claude Auchinleck and the British and Commonwealth forces were reinforced to create, in September 1941, the Eighth Army. During this reorganisation the Western Desert Force reverted to the name XIII Corps in October 1941 and became part of the new army.
