= Operation Battleaxe order of battle =

Operation Battleaxe (15–17 June 1941) was a British Army offensive during the Second World War to raise the Siege of Tobruk and re-capture eastern Cyrenaica from German and Italian forces. The offensive's failure led to the replacement of British General Sir Archibald Wavell, Commander-in-Chief Middle East, by Claude Auchinleck; Wavell took Auchinleck's position as Commander-in-Chief, India.

== British and Commonwealth Forces ==
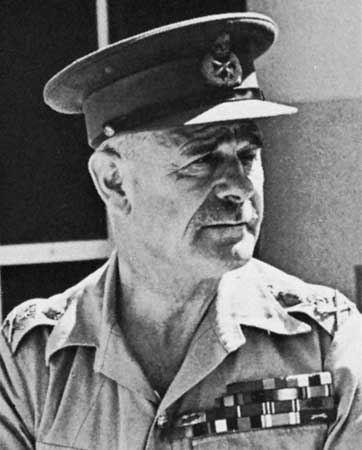
Gen. Archibald Wavell

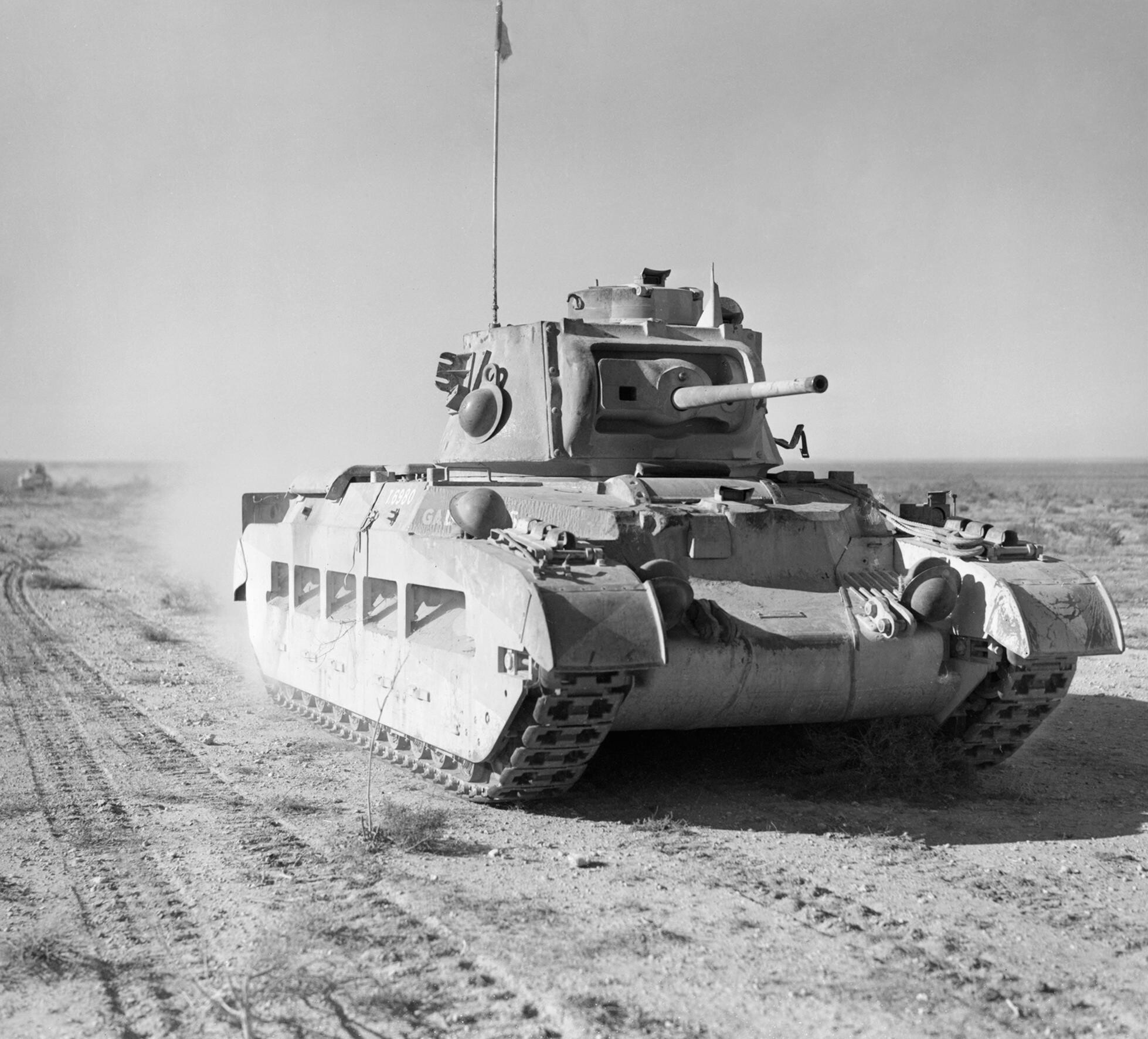
Matilda tank

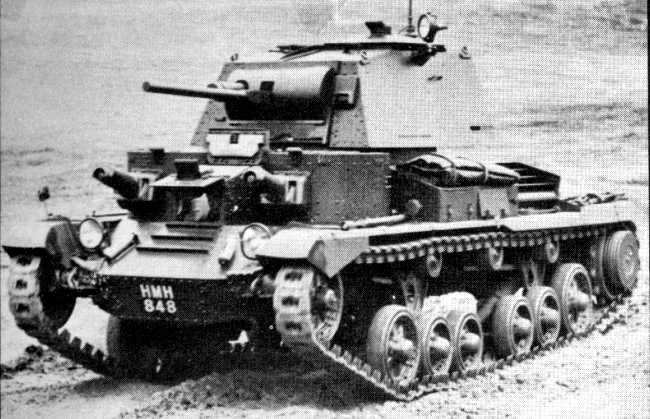
Cruiser tank Mk I

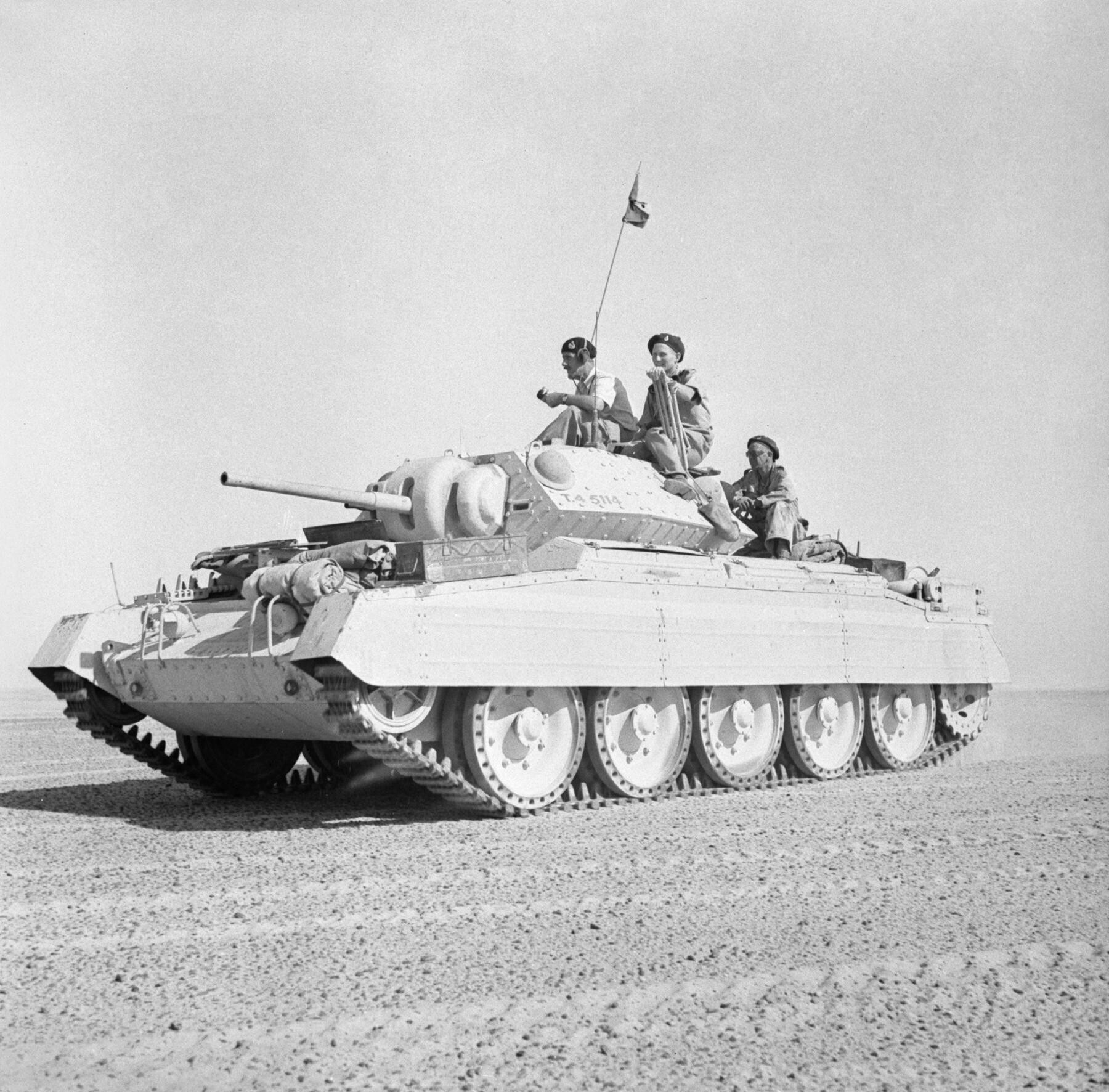
Crusader tank

Commander in Chief, Middle East
General Archibald Wavell

Western Desert Force
Lieutenant-General Noel Beresford-Peirse

7th Armoured Division
Major-General Michael O'Moore Creagh

4th Armoured Brigade (Brigadier Alexander Gatehouse) (Note: The 4th Armoured Brigade was under the effective command of Masservy's 4th Indian Infantry Division)

4th Royal Tank Regiment (Matilda tanks) (Lieutenant-Colonel Walter O'Carroll)
7th Royal Tank Regiment (Matilda tanks) (Lieutenant-Colonel Basil Groves)

7th Armoured Brigade (Brigadier Hugh Russell)

2nd Royal Tank Regiment (Mk I, II and III/IV Cruiser tanks)
6th Royal Tank Regiment (Crusader tanks) (Lieutenant-Colonel Leonard Harland)

7th Support Group (Brigadier John Campbell)

1st, 3rd, 4th, and 106th Regiments Royal Horse Artillery
1st battalion, King's Royal Rifle Corps
2nd battalion, Rifle Brigade

Divisional troops

11th Hussars (Reconnaissance regiment) (Lieutenant-Colonel William Leetham)
Engineers

4th Field Squadron, RE
143rd Field Park Squadron, RE

4th Indian Infantry Division
Major-General Frank Messervy

11th Indian Infantry Brigade
Brigadier Reginald Savory

2nd battalion, Queen's Own Cameron Highlanders
1st battalion, 6th Rajputana Rifles
2nd battalion, 5th Mahratta Light Infantry

22nd Guards Brigade
Brigadier Ian Erskine

1st battalion, Buffs (Royal East Kent Regiment)
2nd battalion, Scots Guards
3rd battalion, Coldstream Guards
22nd Guards Brigade Attack Company

Divisional troops

Central India Horse (Reconnaissance regiment)
25th Field Regiment, RA
31st Field Regiment, RA
Engineers

4th, 12th, 18th, and 21st Field Company (sappers and miners)
11th Field Park Company

== German and Italian forces ==
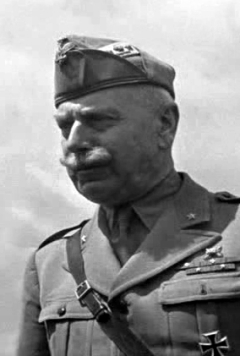
Gen. d'Arm. Italo Gariboldi

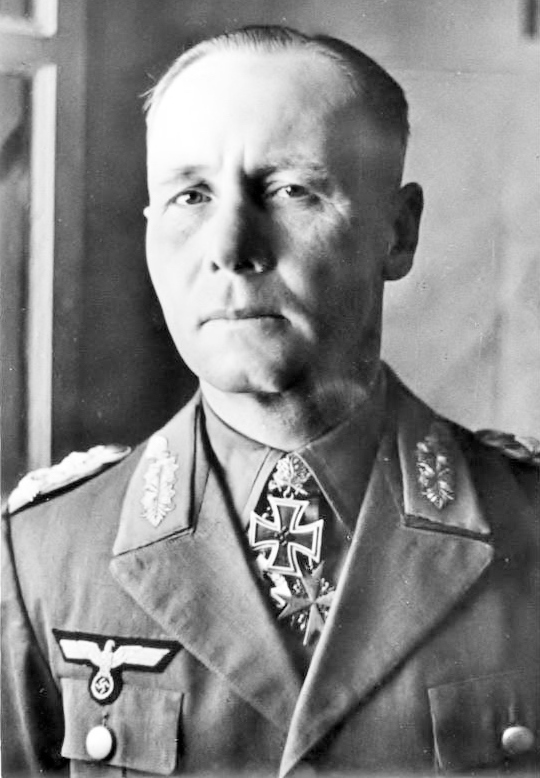
Genlt. Erwin Rommel

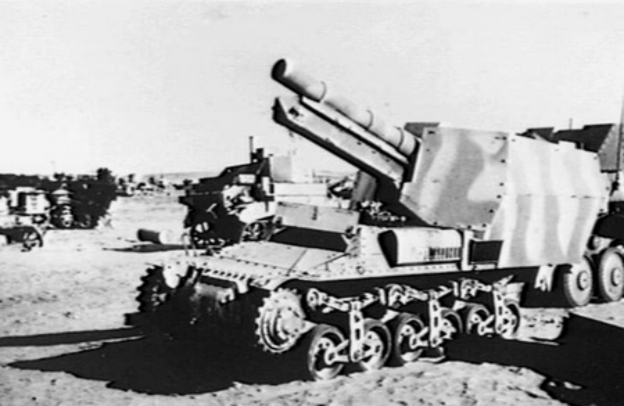
Damaged German 150mm self-propelled howitzer in North Africa

Comandante Superiore
Generale d'Armata Italo Gariboldi (Note: The Comandante Superiore was Rommel's superior during the campaign.)

Deutsches Afrika Korps
Generalleutnant Erwin Rommel

15th Panzer Division
Generalleutnant Walter Neumann-Silkow

8th Panzer Regiment (Oberstleutnant Hans Cramer)

1st Battalion (Hauptmann Johannes Kümmel)
2nd Battalion

1st Battalion of the 104th Motor Infantry Regiment (Wilhelm Bach) (Note: Stationed at Halfaya Pass)
Reconnaissance Battalion 33
1st Abteilung of the 33rd Artillery Regiment
33rd Panzerjäger Battalion (12 50 mm (1.97 in) PaK 38 and 21 37 mm (1.46 in) PaK 36 anti-tank guns)
15th Motorcycle Battalion (Hauptmann Curt Ehle)
One anti-aircraft battery (with 13 88 mm (3.46 in) FlaK 18 and 36 anti-aircraft guns)

5th Light Division
Generalleutnant Johann von Ravenstein

5th Panzer Regiment
3rd Reconnaissance Battalion

102nd Motorised Division "Trento"
Generale di Divisione Luigi Nuvoloni

Three infantry battalions and one artillery regiment (stationed at the Sollum-Musaid-Capuzzo area)

Korps troops

Two regiments Italian artillery (stationed at Bardia)
One regiment FlaK (88 mm guns)

== Bibliography ==
- Pitt, Barrie (1989). The Crucible of War: Western Desert 1941. New York: Paragon House. ISBN 1-55778-232-6.
- "The Development of German Defensive Tactics in Cyrenaica—1941". The Lone Sentry.
- "Reasons for the failure of Battleaxe". Panzer Abwehr Blog.
