= Jock column =

Military formation during the Second World War

During the Second World War, Jock columns were small combined arms groups of armoured cars, artillery and motorised infantry, generally drawn from the British 7th Armoured Division. They were used in the Western Desert Campaign by the British Army to harass German and Italian forces. The columns were named after an officer who was a superb exponent of the tactic and may have conceived it originally, Lieutenant Colonel John Charles "Jock" Campbell.

The basis for the Jock column was a battery of six 25-pounder and a troop of 2-pounders, supported by a squadron of tanks and a company of infantry, along with several anti-aircraft artillery guns. Having suffered heavily in the Battle of Greece and in Crete, the mobility of the Jock column allowed the British to compensate for their equipment losses by deploying artillery where needed. On the defensive, Jock columns could effectively harass the enemy, or attack their rear areas, but the columns' decentralized nature made them ill-suited for stopping a major attack.

However, once the British went on the offensive in mid-1941 with their Brevity and Battleaxe operations, "British doctrine had become weakened by the improvised over-use of Jock Columns". Rather than concentrating armor as Rommel tended to, the columns were further separating their tanks into groups which were more easily defeated. The splitting up of critical medium and heavy artillery made them less effective at covering assault troops, and "Royal Artillery commanders were critical of the lack of concentration of guns".

== See also ==
- William Gott
- Flying column
- Long Range Desert Group
