= Percy Hobart =

British Army officer and engineer (1885–1957)

Major-General Sir Percy Hobart KBE CB DSO MC
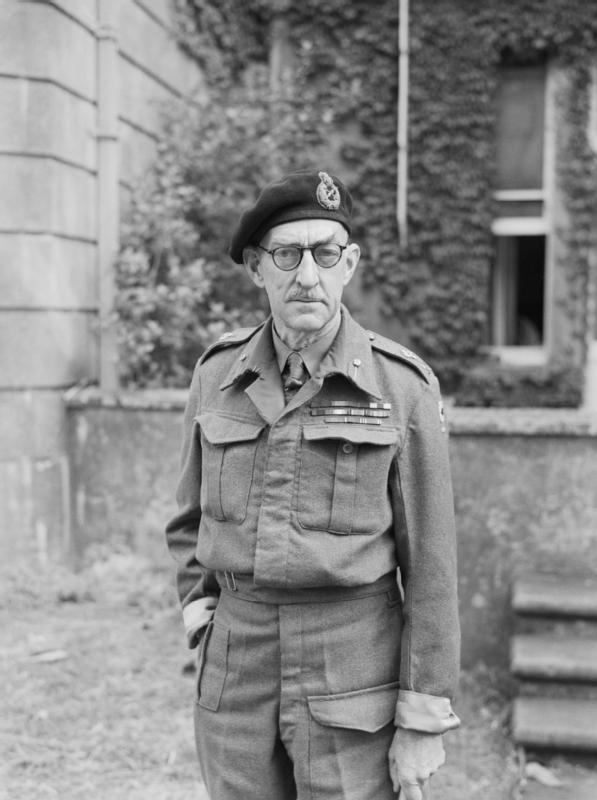
- Born: 14 June 1885; Nainital, British India
- Died: 19 February 1957 (aged 71); Farnham, Surrey
- Military career
- Allegiance: British
- Branch: British Army
- Service years: 1902–1946
- Rank: Major-General
- Nickname: "Hobo"
- Service number: 23838
- Units: Royal Engineers; Royal Tank Regiment
- Commands: Specialised Armor Development Establishment; 79th Armoured Division; 11th Armoured Division; Mobile Division (Egypt); 2nd Battalion, Royal Tank Corps
- Conflicts: North-West Frontier; First World War: Battle of Neuve Chapelle; Second Battle of Artois; Battle of Loos; Siege of Kut; Battle of Megiddo; Waziristan campaign Second World War: Operation Overlord; Battle of the Scheldt; Operation Plunder
- Awards: Knight Commander of the Order of the British Empire; Companion of the Order of the Bath; Distinguished Service Order; Military Cross; Mentioned in Despatches (9); Legion of Merit (United States)

Major-General Sir Percy Cleghorn Stanley Hobart, KBE, CB, DSO, MC (14 June 1885 – 19 February 1957), also known as "Hobo", was a British Army officer and engineer best known for his command of the 79th Armoured Division during the Second World War. He was responsible for many of the specialised armoured vehicles ("Hobart's Funnies") that took part in Operation Overlord and subsequent engagements.

== Early life ==
Hobart was born in Nainital, British India, to Indian Civil Service official Robert T. Hobart and Janetta Hobart (née Stanley). His mother was born in County Tyrone (Northern Ireland) and lived at Roughan Park, near Newmills, between Cookstown and Dungannon. She married Robert Hobart in Tullaniskin Parish Church, Dungannon, on 7 October 1880.

In his youth, Hobart studied history, painting, literature and church architecture. He was educated at Temple Grove School and Clifton College, and in 1904 he graduated from the Royal Military Academy, Woolwich and was commissioned into the Royal Engineers. He was first sent to India, but during the First World War he served in France and Mesopotamia (now Iraq). He moved from being a brigade major to a general staff officer, grade 2 (GSO2), on 4 October 1918.

The war now over, he took part in the Waziristan campaign 1919–1920, when British and Indian forces put down unrest in local villages.

Attending the Staff College, Camberley, in 1920, in 1923, foreseeing the predominance of tank warfare, Hobart volunteered to be transferred to the Royal Tank Corps. While there, he gained the nickname "Hobo", and was greatly influenced by the writings of B. H. Liddell Hart on armoured warfare. He was appointed as an instructor at the Staff College, Quetta, in 1923 where he served until 1927. In November 1928, Hobart married Dorothea Field, the daughter of Colonel C. Field, Royal Marines. They had one daughter. His sister, Elizabeth, married Field Marshal Bernard Montgomery.

In 1934, Hobart became brigadier of the first permanent armoured brigade in Britain and Inspector, Royal Tank Corps. He had to fight for resources for his command because the British Army was still dominated by conservative cavalry officers. German General Heinz Guderian kept abreast of Hobart's writings using, at his own expense, someone to translate all of Hobart's articles being published in Britain.

In 1937, Hobart was made Deputy Director of Staff Duties (Armoured Fighting Vehicles) and later Director of Military Training. He was promoted to major general on 18 December 1937. In 1938, Hobart was sent to form and train "Mobile Force (Egypt)" although a local general resisted his efforts. While sometimes referred to as the "Mobile Farce" by critics, Mobile Force (Egypt) survived and later became known as the "Desert Rats", or more formally as the 7th Armoured Division.

== Second World War ==
Hobart was forced into retirement in 1940, based on hostile War Office information due to his "unconventional" ideas about armoured warfare. He joined the Local Defence Volunteers (precursor to the Home Guard) as a lance corporal and was charged with the defence of his home town, Chipping Campden. "At once, Chipping Campden became a hedgehog of bristling defiance", and Hobart was promoted to become Deputy Area Organiser. Liddell Hart criticised the decision to retire Hobart and wrote an article in the newspaper Sunday Pictorial. Winston Churchill was notified and he had Hobart recalled into the army over Chief of the Imperial General Staff Alan Brooke's objections in 1941. Hobart was assigned to train the 11th Armoured Division, a task which was recognised as extremely successfully achieved.

Hobart's detractors tried again to have him removed, this time on medical grounds but Churchill rebuffed them. He was relatively old (57) for active command and he had been ill. Once again, Hobart was assigned to raise and train a fresh armoured division, this time the 79th Armoured Division.

=== 79th Armoured Division ===
The Dieppe Raid in August 1942 had demonstrated the inability of regular tanks and infantry to cope with fortified obstacles in an amphibious landing. This showed the need for specialised vehicles to cope with natural and man-made obstructions during and after the Allied invasion of Europe.

Badge of the 79th Armoured Division

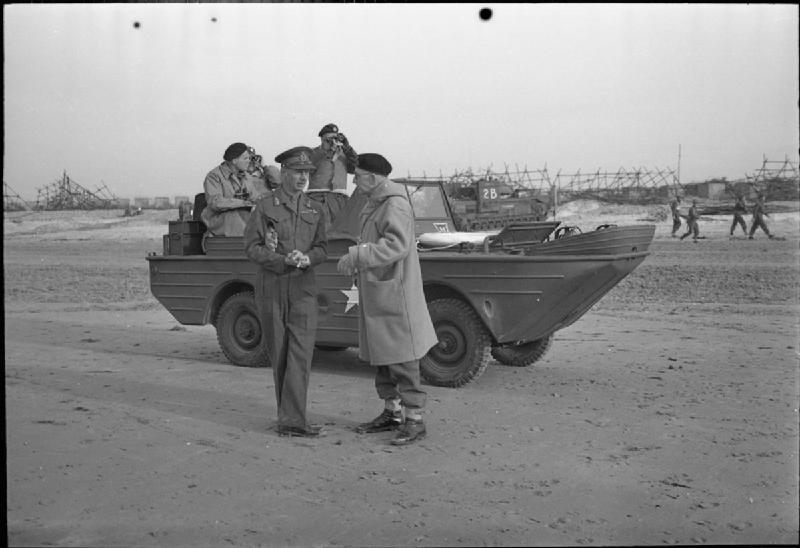
Lieutenant-General Miles Dempsey (left) and Major-General Percy Hobart during D-Day exercises in the United Kingdom, 1 May 1944.

In March 1943, Hobart's 79th Armoured was about to be disbanded, due to lack of resources, but the Chief of the Imperial General Staff, General Brooke, in a "happy brainwave", invited Hobart to convert his division into a unit of specialised armour. Hobart was reputedly suspicious at first and conferred with Liddell Hart before accepting, with the assurance that it would be an operational unit with a combat role. The unit was renamed the "79th (Experimental) Armoured Division Royal Engineers". Unit insignia was a black bull's head with flaring nostrils superimposed over a yellow triangle; this was carried proudly on every vehicle. Hobart's brother-in-law, General Sir Bernard Montgomery, informed the American general Dwight D. Eisenhower of his need to build specialised tanks.

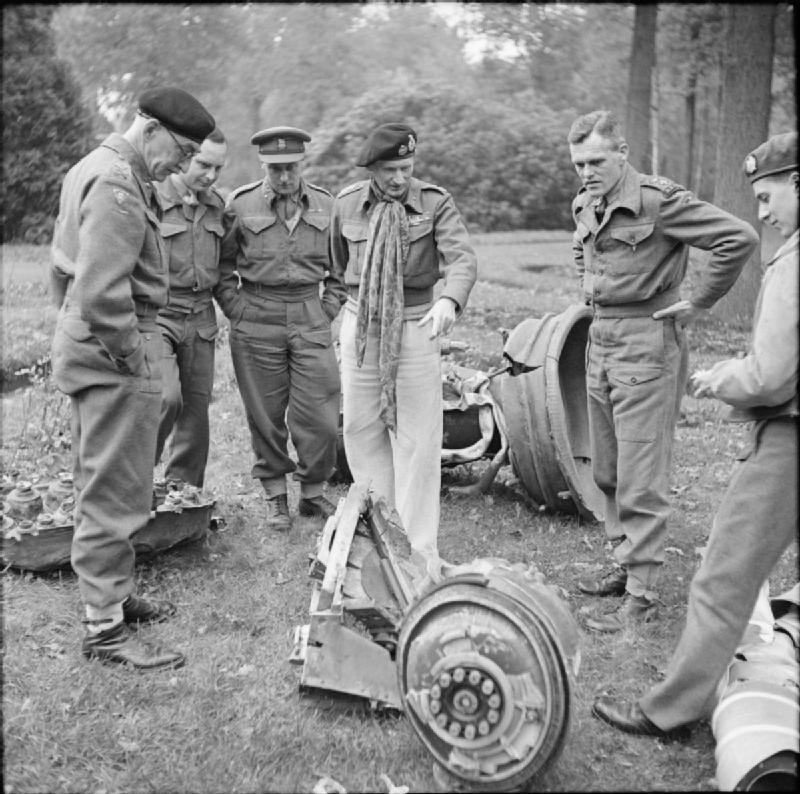
Field Marshal Montgomery examines the remains of a German V2 rocket near the HQ of Major General Percy Hobart, GOC 79th Armoured Division (left), 30 October 1944.

Under Hobart's leadership, the 79th assembled units of modified tank designs collectively nicknamed "Hobart's Funnies". These were used in the Normandy landings and were credited with helping the Allies get ashore. The 79th's vehicles were offered to the British and Canadian forces taking part in the landings of Operation Overlord, and were demonstrated to American First Army Commander, Lieutenant General Omar Bradley for US use. Bradley immediately understood their usefulness and on 16 February 1944 he requested five companies (about 100) of the Sherman DD (swimming) tanks, twenty-five Sherman flails and one hundred Churchill Crocodile flamethrowers from the British War Office for use on both Omaha and Utah beaches. Unfortunately, not enough of the flails and Crocodiles had been converted to meet the Anglo-Canadian requirements and the new US requests. The American forces benefitted only from the Sherman DDs and Sherman dozers, of which more were available due to many being built in America. Liddell Hart said of him: "To have moulded the best two British armoured divisions of the war was an outstanding achievement, but Hobart made it a "hat trick" by his subsequent training of the specialised 79th Armoured Division, the decisive factor on D-Day."

The vehicles of the 79th did not deploy as units together but were attached to other units. By the end of the war the 79th had almost seven thousand vehicles. The 79th Armoured Division was disbanded on 20 August 1945.

Hobart returned to retirement in 1946 and died in 1957 in Farnham, Surrey.

A barracks in Detmold, Germany, was named after him. Hobart Barracks has since been handed back to the German government and no longer functions as a barracks.

== Awards and decorations ==
In 1943, Hobart was made a Knight Commander of the Order of the British Empire (KBE). After the war, he was awarded the American Legion of Merit. During his career, Hobart also became a Companion of the Order of the Bath (CB) and, for his actions in the First World War, received the Distinguished Service Order (DSO) and Military Cross (MC). During his military career he was also mentioned in despatches nine times.

== Footnotes ==
Military offices
New command	GOC Mobile Force (Egypt); 1938–1939	Succeeded by Michael Creagh
New command	GOC 11th Armoured Division; 1941–1942	Succeeded by Charles Keightley
Preceded by Charles Keightley	GOC 11th Armoured Division; May–October 1942	Succeeded by Brocas Burrows
