= William Gott =

British Army general (1897–1942)

Lieutenant-General William Gott CB CBE DSO & Bar MC
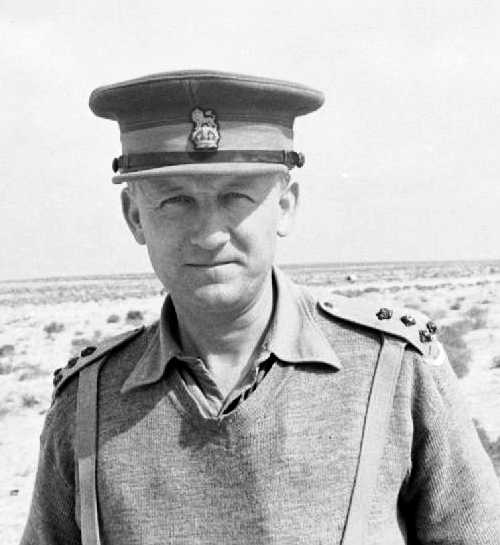
- Born: 13 August 1897; Scarborough, North Yorkshire, England
- Died: 7 August 1942 (aged 44) near Alexandria, Egypt
- Burial place: Alamein Memorial, El Alamein, Egypt
- Military career
- Allegiance: United Kingdom
- Branch: British Army
- Service years: 1915–1942
- Rank: Lieutenant-General
- Nickname: "Strafer"
- Service number: 1798
- Unit: King's Royal Rifle Corps
- Commands: XIII Corps (1942); 7th Armoured Division (1941–1942); 2nd Support Group (1941); 7th Support Group (1940–1941); 1st Battalion, King's Royal Rifle Corps (1938–1939)
- Conflicts: First World War; Second World War: North African campaign; Western Desert campaign †
- Awards: Companion of the Order of the Bath; Commander of the Order of the British Empire; Distinguished Service Order & Bar; Military Cross; Mentioned in despatches

Lieutenant-General William Henry Ewart Gott (13 August 1897 – 7 August 1942), nicknamed "Strafer", was a senior British Army officer who fought during both the First and the Second World Wars, reaching the rank of lieutenant-general while serving with the British Eighth Army in the Western Desert and North Africa from 1940 to 1942. In August 1942, he was appointed as successor to General Claude Auchinleck as commander of the Eighth Army, but on the way to take up his command, his plane was shot down and he was killed. His death led to the appointment of Lieutenant-general Bernard Montgomery in his place.

== Military career ==
Educated at Harrow School, he was commissioned as a second lieutenant into the King's Royal Rifle Corps (KRRC) in February 1915, and served with distinction with the British Expeditionary Force (BEF) in France during the First World War. His nickname "Strafer" was a pun on the German war slogan Gott strafe England (God punish England). He was promoted to the rank of captain in January 1921, and attended the Staff College, Camberley from January 1930 until December 1931. He was promoted major in July 1934, having been made a brevet major earlier in January. His service during the interwar period included a posting as adjutant to a territorial battalion, and a period of postings in India as a general staff officer (GSO2) and deputy assistant quartermaster general.

=== North African campaigns ===
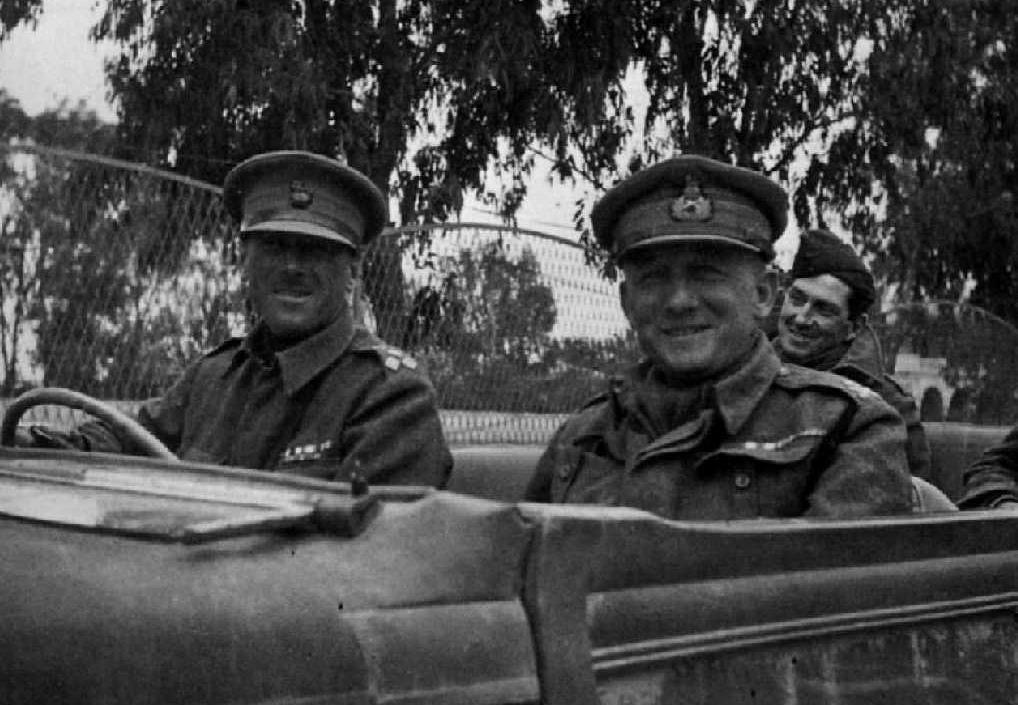
Brigadier Jock Campbell of the 7th Armoured Division driving his commanding officer, Major-General William Gott, pictured here between 1940 and 1942.

Having been promoted lieutenant-colonel in October 1938 to command the 1st Battalion, KRRC on its transfer from Burma to Egypt to become part of the Mobile Division (later to become 7th Armoured Division, the "Desert Rats"), Gott held a succession of posts in the division; he was successively chief staff officer of the division (general staff officer, Grade I, ranked lieutenant-colonel) commander of the Support Group as acting brigadier, and general officer commanding acting major-general of the 7th Armoured Division.

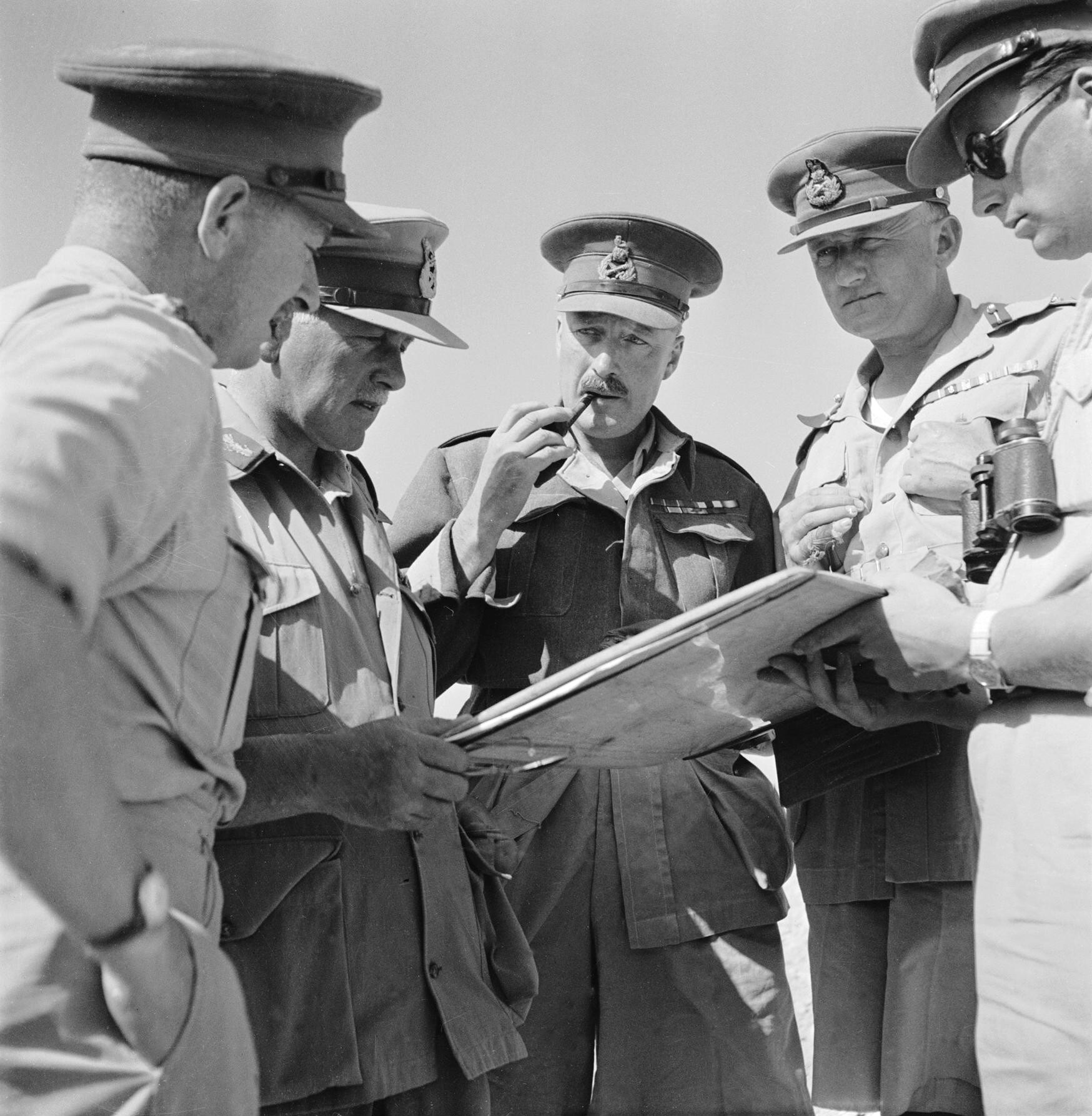
Lieutenant-general Neil Ritchie (centre, with pipe) addressing other officers in North Africa, 31 May 1942; General Gott is second from right, directly to Ritchie's left

While under Gott's command the Support Group performed well from the beginning of the campaign; skirmishing along the frontier from June 1940; conducting a planned withdrawal in September during the Italian invasion of Egypt, and during Operation Compass in December which saw the conquest of Cyrenaica and the destruction of the Italian Tenth Army the following February.

Following the arrival of the German Afrika Korps under the command of Erwin Rommel, the Axis counter-attacked in April and 7th Support Group, which had been refitting in the Delta, was called upon to stabilise the front and to reform the retreating forces, which was achieved at the Libyan–Egyptian border. In May, Gott was placed in command of a mixed force to plan and conduct the ambitious Operation Brevity which succeeded in re-taking the Halfaya Pass but failed in its wider objectives. A subsequent larger scale operation, Operation Battleaxe, in which the Support Group also took part was also a failure and led to a reorganisation of the commands in the Western Desert which included Gott's promotion to command the 7th Armoured Division.

During the next major Commonwealth offensive, Operation Crusader, in November 1941, 7th Armoured Division was severely mauled by the Afrika Korps at the battle of Sidi Rezegh, but kept the field and contributed to the British Eighth Army's ultimate success.

Gott's permanent rank had been made up to full colonel in October 1941 and he was promoted to acting lieutenant-general and given command of XIII Corps in early 1942.

During the Battle of Gazala, the 8th Army's performance was fatally handicapped by a breakdown in relations at all levels; within XIII Corps during this period Gott's relationship with his subordinate Dan Pienaar, the commander of 1st South African Division, had deteriorated completely. Of XIII Corps performance in the action, the stand by 150th Brigade, and the breakout by 50th Division are notable, while the low point was the loss of Tobruk with its entire garrison during the withdrawal to Egypt.

XIII Corps was able to withdraw in good order to the Alamein position and was instrumental in fighting the Axis to a standstill there in the First Battle of El Alamein.

=== Death ===
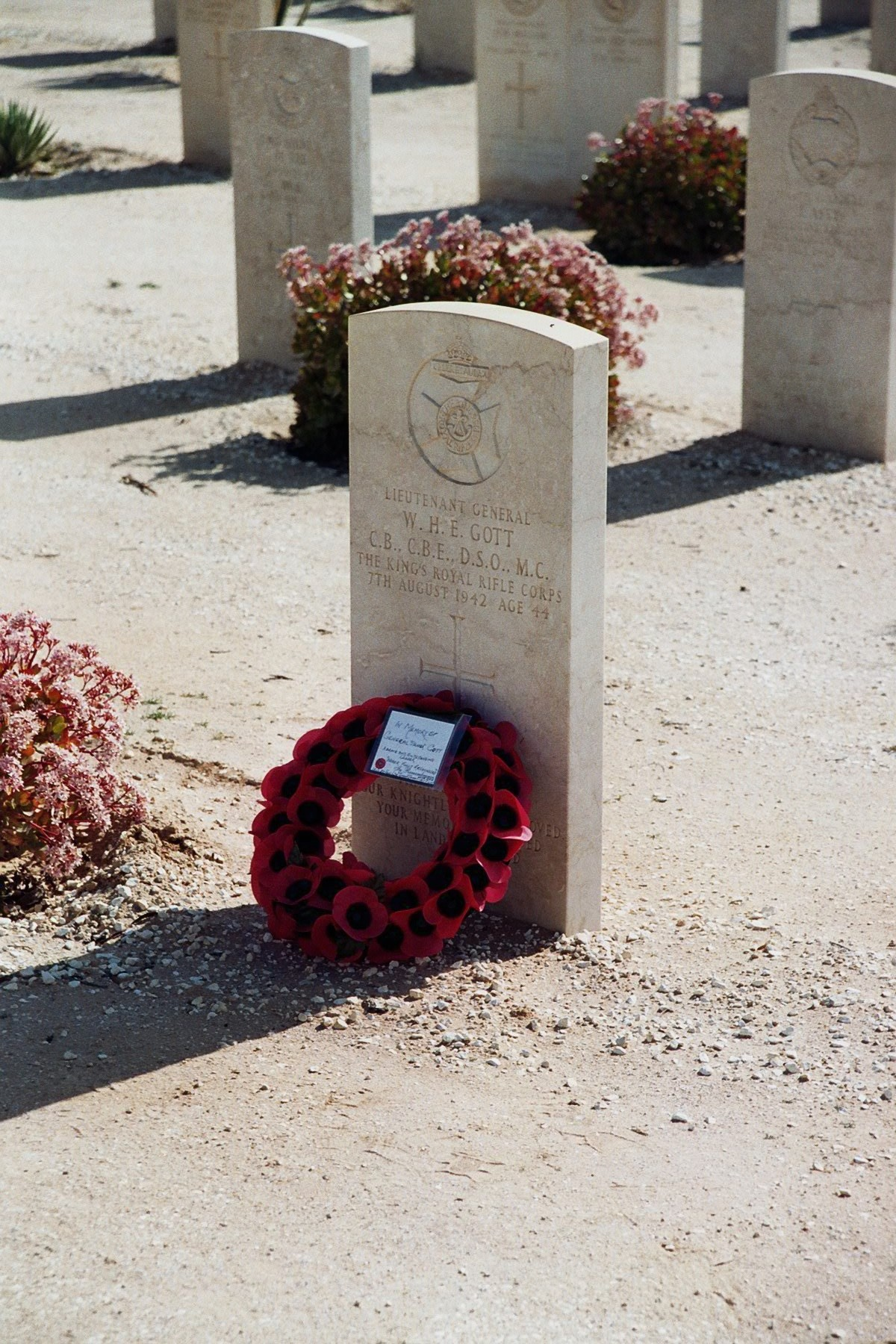
The grave of Lieutenant-General William Gott at the El Alamein cemetery. The wreath was laid by Squadron Leader Jimmy James and his son.

In August 1942, British Prime Minister Winston Churchill removed General Sir Claude Auchinleck as Commander-in-Chief Middle East and acting General Officer Commanding Eighth Army. Gott's aggressive, somewhat impetuous, personality appealed to Churchill, and he was strongly recommended by Anthony Eden, who had served with Gott during the First World War. Gott was therefore chosen to take over Eighth Army. This was despite the reservations of Auchinleck and General Sir Alan Brooke, the Chief of the Imperial General Staff (CIGS). Brooke knew Gott very well and had a high opinion of his abilities. However, a number of factors caused Brooke to feel that Gott was not ready for army command at that time. During a personal interview with Gott on 5 August, Gott told Brooke that he had "tried most of his ideas on the Boche. We want someone with new ideas and plenty of confidence in them". Brooke concluded that Gott was tired and had temporarily lost his drive, having been in the desert since the start of the war. He also felt that Gott needed more experience before taking an army command.

Gott was killed when the transport plane he was travelling in was shot down and destroyed while returning to Cairo from the front. The aircraft, a Bristol Bombay of No. 216 Squadron RAF flown by 19-year-old Flight Sergeant Hugh "Jimmy" James, was intercepted and shot down by Unteroffizier Bernd Schneider and Emil Clade of Jagdgeschwader 27 (Fighter Wing 27). With both engines out, the pilot had made a crash landing, but two German Messerschmitt Bf 109 fighters attacked the crashed plane, strafing it until the Bombay was destroyed. Those who were unable to escape from the Bombay (including Gott) were killed. Gott's body was buried at the El Alamein War Cemetery. His replacement was Lieutenant-general Bernard Montgomery, who had been Brooke's choice. The Burg el Arab–Heliopolis route was "considered so safe that no escort had been found necessary for Winston [Churchill] when we flew out" but a German plane driven out of high altitude combat came across the slow transport plane. It was later reported that Messerschmitt Bf 109s attacked the ill-fated transport plane. The Germans knew before the British that Gott was dead: the German air crews had been greeted on their return to base with "Congratulations, gentlemen. You have just killed General Strafer Gott, the new commander of the 8th Army!" It is thought the Germans broke the code used by a loquacious American air attaché in Cairo, Bonner Fellers and intercepted an operational broadcast.

== Assessment ==
A big man with an aggressive, outgoing personality, he was popular with soldiers under his command, but as a senior commander he was considered by some to be out of his depth. John Bierman and Colin Smith say that Gott was much admired for his personal qualities, but lacked real military skill. He was one of the few senior officers who was "well known and well liked by the rank and file". However, "a cold appraisal of his soldiering in North Africa reveals no stunning display of tactics or Rommel-esque grip that bends scared and exhausted men to the will of the born leader." Field Marshal Sir Michael Carver, one of Gott's officers, took a similar view. He stated that Gott was the one person to whom "all, high and low, turned for advice, sympathy, help and encouragement", but he also believed that Gott was "too good a man to be a really great soldier". Gott's own view, as expressed to Alan Brooke was that he was the wrong man for the task, though he was soldier enough to take it on if ordered to. Churchill himself seems to have accepted that he made a mistake in appointing Gott instead of Montgomery, after seeing how Montgomery had revitalised the Eighth Army. Gott's daughters presented his medals to the Royal Green Jackets (Rifles) Museum in 2012.

== Bibliography ==
- Alanbrooke, Field Marshal Lord (2001). Danchev, Alex; Todman, Daniel (eds.). War Diaries 1939–1945. London: Phoenix Press. ISBN 1-84212-526-5.
- Mead, Richard (2007). Churchill's Lions: a biographical guide to the key British generals of World War II. Stroud (UK): Spellmount. ISBN 978-1-86227-431-0.
- Smart, Nick (2005). Biographical Dictionary of British Generals of the Second World War. Barnesley: Pen & Sword. ISBN 1844150496.
- Nash, N.S., 'Strafer' – The Desert General: The Life and Killing of Lieutenant General WHE Gott CB CBE DSO*MC", Pen and Sword, 2013

Military offices
Preceded by Michael O'Moore Creagh	GOC 7th Armoured Division; 1941–1942	Succeeded by Jock Campbell
Preceded by Reade Godwin-Austen	GOC XIII Corps; February–August 1942	Succeeded by Brian Horrocks
