= Michael O'Moore Creagh =

British Army general (1892–1970)

Major-General Sir Michael O'Moore Creagh KBE MC
- Born: 16 May 1892; Cahirbane, County Clare, Ireland
- Died: 14 December 1970 (aged 78); London, Middlesex, England
- Relatives: Sir O'Moore Creagh (father)
- Military career
- Allegiance: United Kingdom
- Branch: British Army
- Service years: 1911–1944
- Rank: Major-General
- Service number: 12355
- Unit: 7th (Queen's Own) Hussars
- Commands: Hampshire and Dorset District (1942–1944); 3rd Armoured Group (1941–1942); 7th Armoured Division (1940–1941); Mobile Division (Egypt) (1939–1940); 15th/19th The King's Royal Hussars (1934–1938)
- Conflicts: First World War; Second World War
- Awards: Knight Commander of the Order of the British Empire; Military Cross; Mentioned in Despatches

Major-General Sir Michael O'Moore Creagh, KBE, MC (16 May 1892 – 14 December 1970) was a British Army officer who served in both the world wars. He commanded the 7th Armoured Division, the Desert Rats, between 1939 and 1941.

== Early life and military career ==
Creagh was born on 16 May 1892 to Sir O'Moore Creagh, a Victoria Cross recipient and officer in the British Indian Army, and his second wife Elizabeth (née Reade). Educated at Wellington College, he entered the Royal Military College, Sandhurst, and was then commissioned into the 7th (Queen's Own) Hussars in 1911.

By the end of the First World War, Creagh had served as an aide de camp to the divisional commander Home Forces (1914–15), as a staff captain in France (1917–18) and a brigade major (1918–19).

Creagh stayed in the army after the war, attending the Staff College, Camberley from 1924 to 1925, and commanded the 15th/19th The King's Royal Hussars from 1934 to 1938. He had been promoted on 15 November 1924.

== Second World War ==
On 4 December 1939, three months after the outbreak of the Second World War, Creagh took over the Mobile Division (Egypt) stationed on the Egyptian frontier, succeeding the original General officer commanding (GOC), Major General Percy Hobart, who was retired by General Sir Archibald Wavell. In February 1940 the formation was renamed 7th Armoured Division and Creagh's tenure of command of this division was the longest of any of its GOCs.

=== Sidi Barrani ===
Creagh led the 7th Armoured Division through its earliest triumphs against the Italians after they entered the war on 10 June 1940. Under General Mario Berti, the Italian Tenth Army invaded Egypt and advanced 60 miles to Sidi Barrani where they halted. It was here that Creagh's 7th Armoured Division fought its first major battle in the Operation Compass counterattack on 8 December, joining with 4th Indian Division in the Western Desert Force to mount the attack. As a result, the Italians were driven back quickly into Cyrenaica, the eastern province of their colonial territory, Libya.

=== Bardia and Tobruk ===
The small port of Bardia fell to advancing British, Australian and Indian forces in the Western Desert Force under the command of General Sir Richard O'Connor, followed as the new year of 1941 came in, by Tobruk as the Italians retreated along the Via Balbia, the metallised coastal road that led back to Benghazi and Tripoli. This was the top half of a semicircle, the bottom straight line of the semicircle was formed by rough rock-strewn desert, unpromising territory for armoured and mechanised military units like 7th Armoured Division.

=== Beda Fomm ===
Creagh's division was to travel via Mechili, Msus and Antelat (the bottom of the semicircle), while the Australian 6th Division chased the retreating Italian Tenth Army along the coast road round the Jebel Akhdar mountains to the north (the curve of the semicircle). The poor terrain was hard going for the tanks, and Creagh took the bold decision to send a flying column – christened "Combe Force" – south-west across the virtually unmapped Libyan Desert. Combe Force, under its namesake Lieutenant Colonel John Combe of the 11th Hussars, consisted of the 11th Hussars, a squadron of the King's Dragoon Guards, the 2nd Battalion Rifle Brigade, an RAF armoured car squadron, anti-tank guns from 3rd Regiment, Royal Horse Artillery and C Battery, 4th Regiment, Royal Horse Artillery. The force totalled about 2,000 men. On 5 February, Combe Force succeeded in cutting off the Italians at Sidi Saleh and Beda Fomm. The small force held the Italians long enough to be joined by the armour of 4 Brigade on 6 February. The bulk of the Tenth Army surrendered the next day as a result of this successful blockade of their path.

In March 1941, Creagh was appointed a Knight Commander of the Order of the British Empire (KBE).

On 3 September 1941, he was relieved as commander of the division by Major General William Gott following the costly failure of Operation Battleaxe. Creagh commanded 3 Armoured Group from 1941 and Hampshire and Dorset District from 1942 before retiring in 1944.

In retirement, Creagh worked for the United Nations Relief and Rehabilitation Administration.

== Sources ==
- Playfair, Major-General I. S. O.; et al. (1957) [1954]. Butler, J. R. M. (ed.). The Mediterranean and Middle East: The Early Successes Against Italy (to May 1941). History of the Second World War, United Kingdom Military Series. Vol. I (4th ed.). HMSO. ISBN 978-1-84574-065-8.
- Smart, Nick (2005). Biographical Dictionary of British Generals of the Second World War. Barnsley, South Yorkshire: Pen and Sword Books. ISBN 1844150496.

Military offices
Preceded by Percy Hobart	GOC Mobile Division (Egypt); 1939–1940	Post redesignated 7th Armoured Division
New command	GOC 7th Armoured Division; 1940–1941	Succeeded by William Gott
