= 7th Support Group =

Military supporting formation within the British 7th Armoured Division

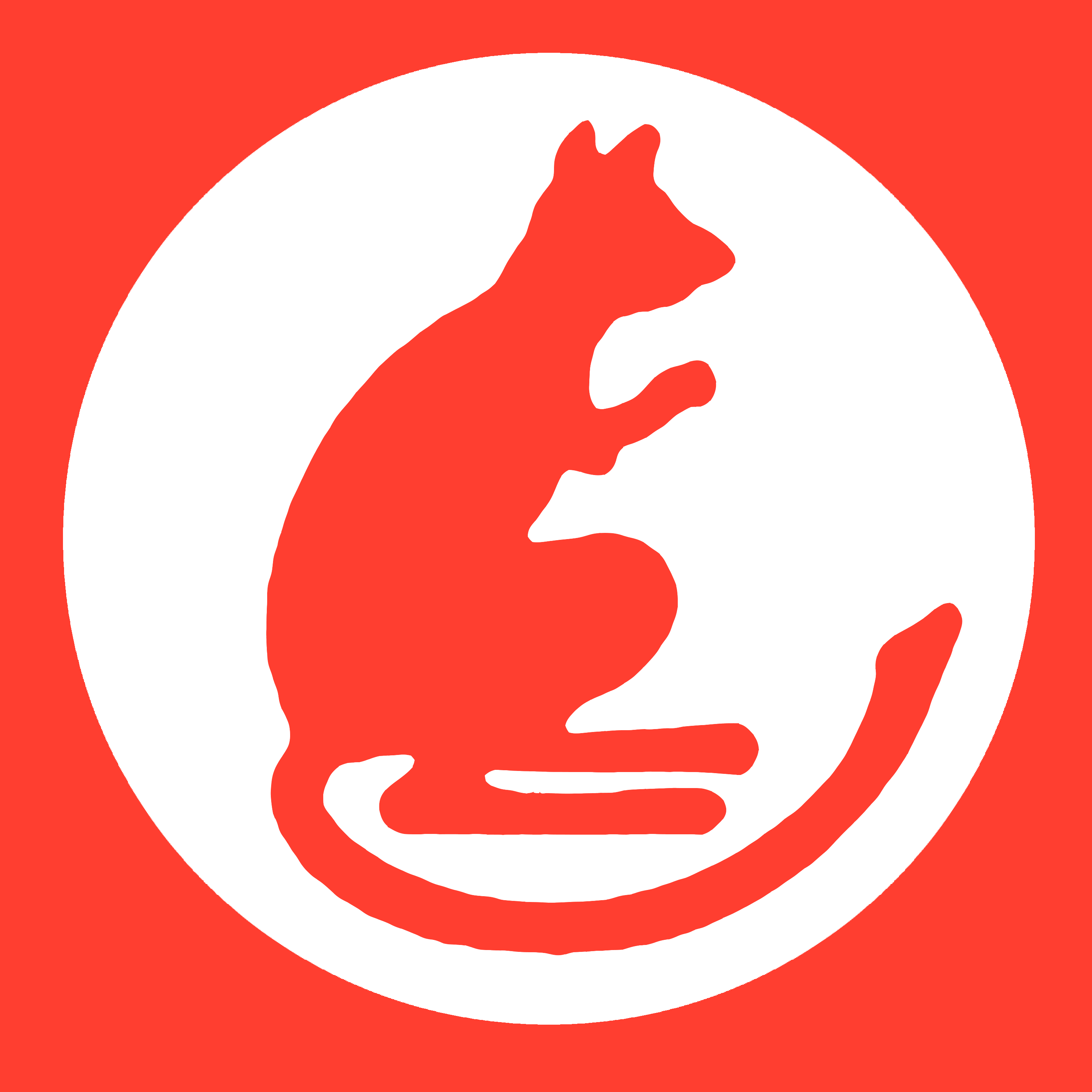
- Active: 22 January 1940–9 February 1942
- Country: United Kingdom
- Branch: British Army
- Type: Armoured Support Group
- Role: Armoured Division Support
- Size: Brigade
- Part of: 7th Armoured Division; 1st Armoured Division

Commanders
- Notable commanders: William Gott; John Campbell

Insignia
- Identification symbol: Red Desert Jerboa

The 7th Support Group was a supporting formation within the British 7th Armoured Division, active during the Second World War's Western Desert Campaign.

== History ==
The 7th Support Group was formed from the expansion of the 7th Armoured Division's existing pivot group. The pivot group, and later the support group, controlled the division's motorised infantry, field artillery, anti-tank guns, and light anti-aircraft guns. While the artillery would provide support for the tanks on an attack, the infantry were intended to protect the division's base or occupy territory captured by the tanks and not supplement them. Towards the end of Operation Crusader, the support group joined the 1st Armoured Division for a couple of weeks before reverting to the command of the 7th Armoured Division. The 7th Support Group was abolished in February 1942, after Crusader came to an end, following a reorganization of the British armoured forces in North Africa.

== Commanders ==
- Lieutenant-Colonel E. S. B. Williams (acting), from 22 January 1940
- Brigadier William Gott - initially the acting commander from 31 January 1940. Gott was then promoted from Lieutenant-Colonel to Brigadier, to officially become the formation's commander from 16 February 1940.
- Brigadier John Campbell - Took command on 12 September 1941. During his tenure as commander, Campbell earned the Victoria Cross.

== Order of battle ==
=== Western Desert Force, 1939 ===
- 4th Regiment, Royal Horse Artillery
- 1st Kings Royal Rifle Corps
- 2nd Rifle Brigade

=== Operation Compass ===
- 4th Regiment, Royal Horse Artillery
- 1st Kings Royal Rifle Corps
- 2nd Rifle Brigade

=== Operation Battleaxe, June 1941 ===
- 1st Regiment, Royal Horse Artillery
- 4th Regiment, Royal Horse Artillery
- 1st Kings Royal Rifle Corps
- 2nd Rifle Brigade

=== Operation Crusader, November 1941 ===
- 3rd Regiment, Royal Horse Artillery
- 4th Regiment, Royal Horse Artillery
- 1st Kings Royal Rifle Corps
- 2nd Rifle Brigade
- 60th (North Midland) Field Regiment, Royal Artillery
- One Bty, 51st Field Regiment, Royal Artillery

== See also ==
- List of British brigades of the Second World War
