= 7th Armoured Division (United Kingdom) =

Division of the British Army, active from 1938 to 1958

Mobile Division (Egypt) / Mobile Division, Egypt Armoured Division (Egypt) 7th Armoured Division (Desert Rats)
- A jerboa had been used on the divisional insignia since early 1940. This variant was adopted in late 1943. The Imperial War Museum stated that due to a miscommunication the design was more akin to a kangaroo rather than intended, and permission was refused to update it.
- Active: 1937–1958
- Country: United Kingdom
- Branch: British Army
- Type: Armour
- Size: 9,442–14,964 men c. 350 tanks (Note: These figures represent the war establishment, the paper strength, of an armoured division. In 1939, an armoured division was to have 9,442 men, close to 400 guns, 351 tanks and about 3,000 vehicles. By 1944, a division was supposed to have 14,964 men, 126 guns, 366 tanks and around 4,000 vehicles. Various organisational changes were introduced throughout the war that changed the composition of armoured divisions. More information can be found at British Army during the Second World War and British armoured formations of the Second World War.)
- Nickname: The Desert Rats
- Engagements: Western Desert campaign Tunisian campaign Italian campaign Invasion of Normandy; Allied advance from Paris to the Rhine

Commanders
- Notable commanders: Percy Hobart; Michael O'Moore Creagh; William Gott; John Campbell; Frank Messervy; John Harding; George Erskine; Lewis Lyne

Insignia
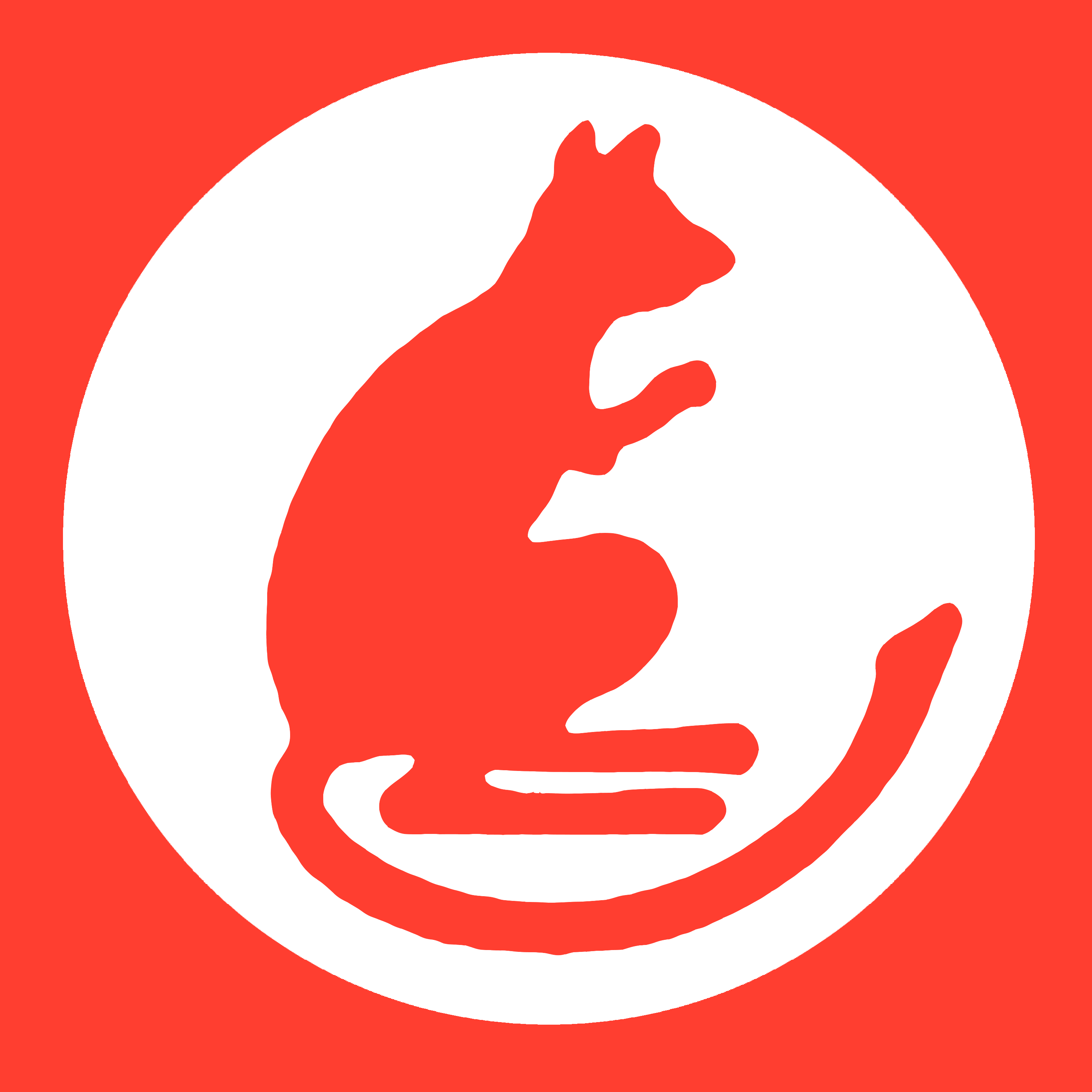
- First insignia to use a jerboa, adopted c.1940

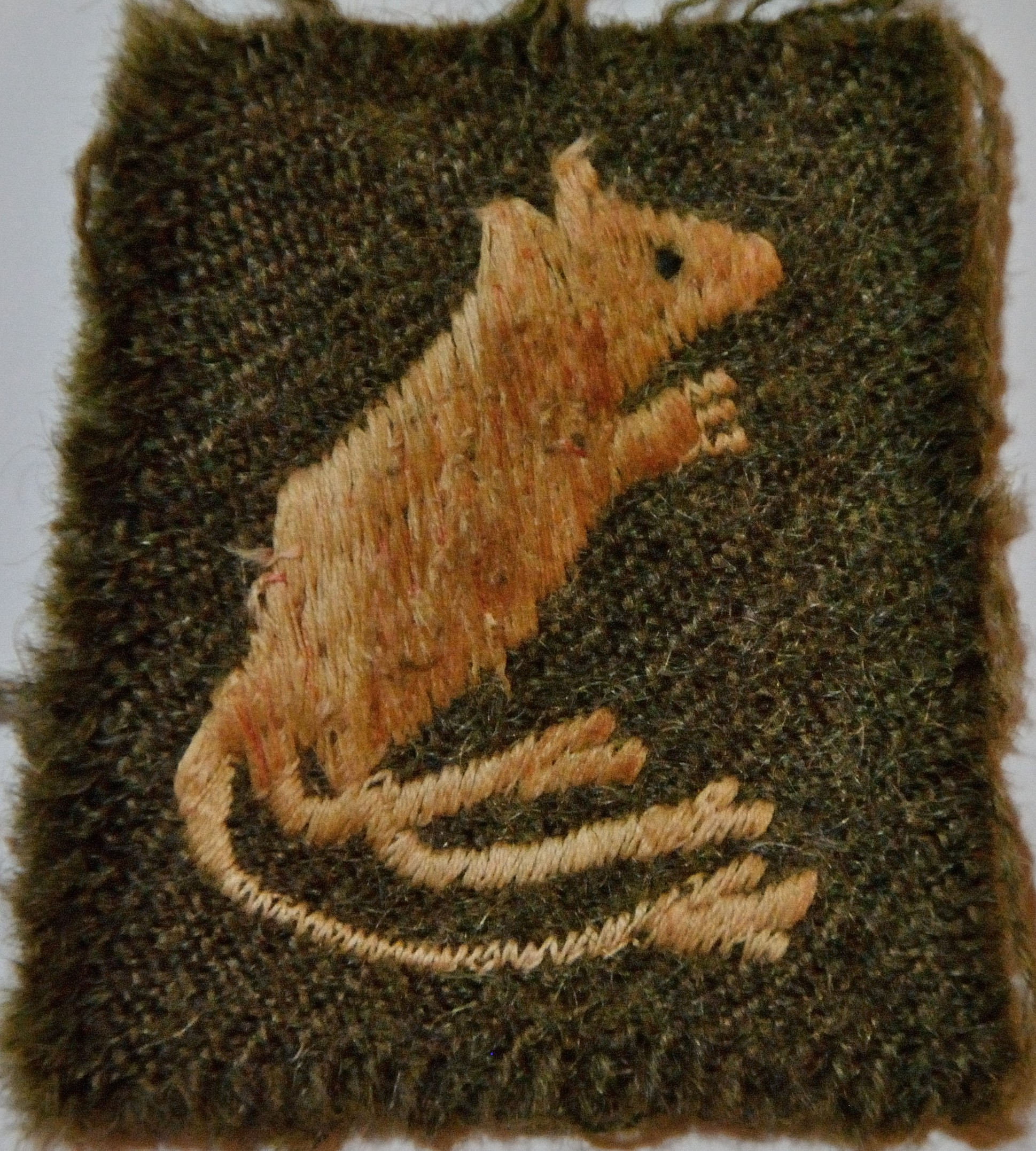
- Second design, adopted prior to the division's deployment to Italy.

The 7th Armoured Division (Desert Rats) was an armoured division of the British Army. It was formed as the Mobile Division (Egypt) on 27 September 1938, after increased tensions between Britain and the Axis powers. This was part of an effort to reinforce and maintain the British strategic presence in Egypt to defend the Suez Canal, which was seen as vital to the British Empire's interests. In February 1940, the formation was renamed as the 7th Armoured Division. During its early years, the jerboa was adopted as the mascot and divisional insignia giving rise to the nickname Desert Rats.

The division fought in most of the major battles of the Western Desert campaign, was then engaged in the Tunisian campaign, and this was followed by the participation in the Italian campaign. It was then withdrawn from Italy and dispatched to the United Kingdom, to prepare for Operation Overlord. In June 1944, it landed in France and subsequently fought across western Europe and ended the war in Kiel and Hamburg, Germany. After the war it formed part of the British Army of the Rhine until it was disbanded in the 1950s. The division's history and insignia was carried on by the 7th Armoured Brigade, until the brigade was disbanded in 2014, and is now maintained by the 7th Light Mechanised Brigade.

== Background ==
The Suez Canal, located in Egypt, was seen as a vital thoroughfare of the British Empire linking Britain with its colonial possessions in the east, especially British India. In addition, it held economic and prestigious importance. To maintain this, Egypt was occupied in 1882 and a protectorate was subsequently established. During the First World War, the Ottoman Empire came into conflict with the Entente, and the British presence in Egypt was reinforced. Following the conclusion of hostilities and the British victory in the Middle Eastern theatre, Britain intended to maintain a garrison to protect the canal. However, military commitments had to be balanced with economic and geopolitical conditions. From a peak of 400,000 men in 1919, the garrison was reduced to 20,000 by 1921 and included the Cairo Cavalry Brigade.

During the inter-war period, the Middle East and the canal gained further importance as oil production expanded, in addition to the development of aerial links between Britain and British India. In 1935, British policy shifted to view Italy as the principal threat towards British interests in the Middle East, following the Italian military build-up and invasion of Ethiopia. This crisis prompted the deployment an ad hoc formation called the Mobile Force, based around the Cairo Cavalry Brigade, to Mersa Matruh in the Western Desert, 170 mi (270 km) west of Alexandria. Due to rain and sandstorms, vehicles became stuck or were stricken by mechanical issues resulting in the moniker "Mobile Farce" being applied. (Note: Mechanisation of this brigade started in 1935, with an intent to have one regiment equipped with light tanks, one with armoured cars, and the third to be motorized cavalry.) The crisis also saw the UK and Egypt negotiate the Anglo-Egyptian treaty of 1936, which stated that the majority of the British military were to be confined to the canal zone except in emergencies. In the case of the latter, troops could be deployed across Egypt. This saw the increased importance of Mersa Matruh, as it became the location from which the defense of Egypt would be conducted if Italy attacked. A joint declaration on 2 January 1937, by Italy and Britain, to maintain the status quo around the Mediterranean, momentarily eased the situation between both countries. However, tensions quickly mounted and in early 1938 the garrison in Egypt was authorised to be brought up from its peace time to its wartime establishment. It was envisioned that behind the Mersa Matruh position, a force of one mobile and two infantry divisions could be assembled in the event of war. (Note: Mobile Division was the initial terminology used, by the British Army, to describe a tank-based force. They would later be known as an armoured division.) During the same year, the political situation in Europe escalated as Germany annexed Austria and then focused its attention on the German-dominated territory within Czechoslovakia. As Italy was closely aligned with Germany, British forces moved to Mersa Matruh and authorization was provided to form a mobile division in Egypt.

== Formation ==
In September 1938, due to the tensions between Britain and the Axis powers and a concern that Italy could invade Egypt, the Cairo Cavalry Brigade was ordered to Mersa Matruh. The brigade consisted of the 7th Hussars equipped with light tanks, the 8th Hussars outfitted with trucks with the intent to be motorised cavalry, and the 11th Hussars with armoured cars. (Note: British doctrine initially defined light tanks as reconnaissance vehicles armed only with machine guns.) Once there, the brigade was reinforced by the 1st Battalion, Royal Tank Corps, as well as artillery, engineers, medical, and logistical units and became known as the Mobile Force. (Note: On 4 April 1939, the Royal Armoured Corps was formed to command all mechanised cavalry and the battalions of the Royal Tank Corps. The latter was renamed the Royal Tank Regiment and its nomenclature colloquially changed; each unit dropped the word battalion from their names, although this was not officially adopted until September 1945.) The assortment of different models of light tanks that the force had, lacked spare parts and the tank tracks had reached the end of their potential mileage capacity. For example, the 1st Battalion, Royal Tank Corps, had 63 light tanks but were quickly reduced to nine serviceable models. However, the historian Kenneth Macksey, a member of the Royal Armoured Corps during the Second World War, contended that it "might well have prevailed had the Italians" invaded Egypt, due to the armoured cars being in good working order and the Italian opposition consisting largely of tankettes. When tensions subsided, due to the Munich Agreement on 30 September, the force moved to Cairo where it was joined by is first infantry unit, the 1st Battalion, King's Royal Rifle Corps (1st KRRC).

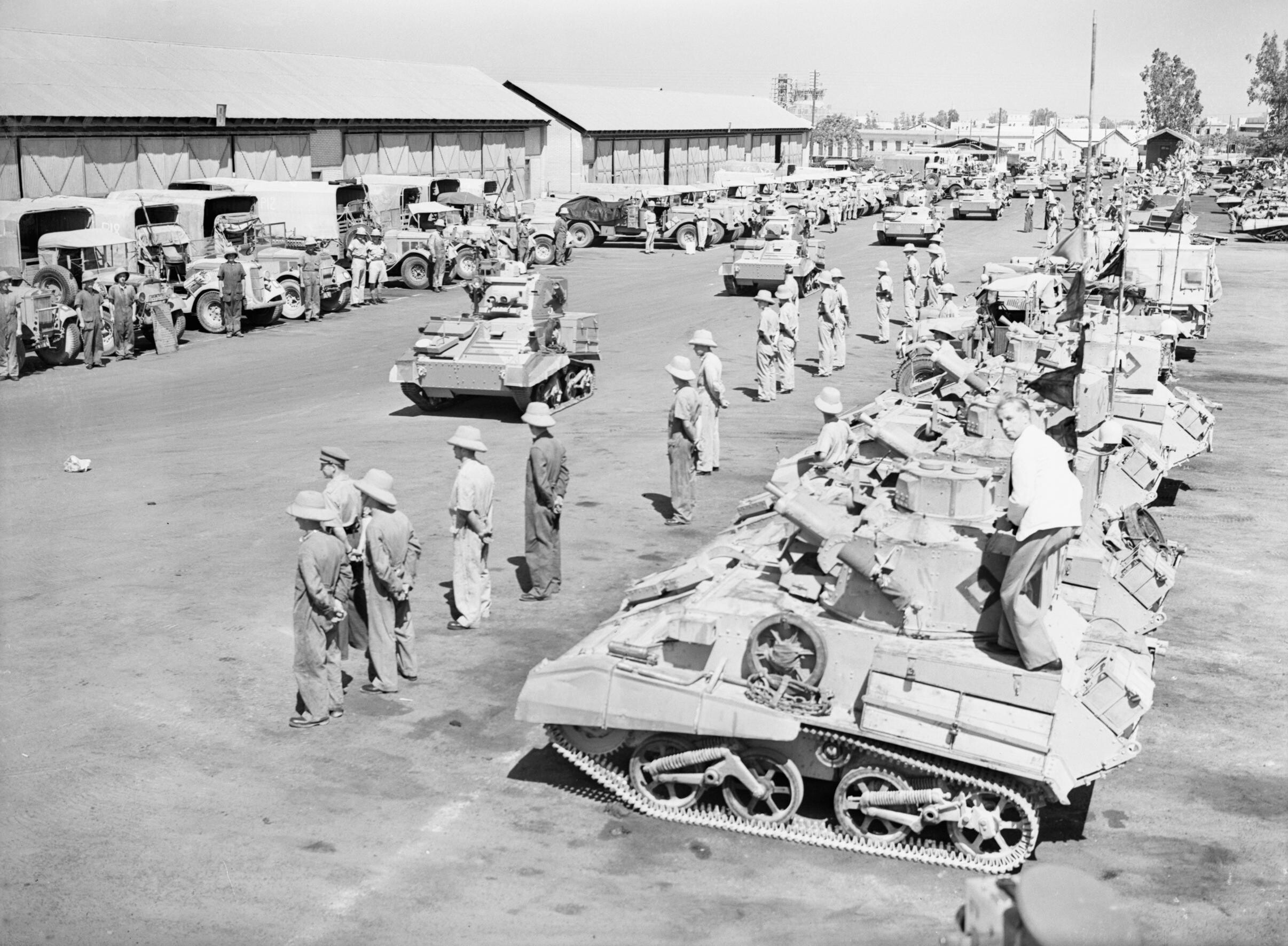
Mk VI light tanks and lorries of the 8th Hussars, assembled prior to a desert exercise, 5 June 1940.

In the meantime, on 27 September, Major-General Percy Hobart was reassigned from being the Director of Military Training and ordered to Egypt to form an armoured formation. He joined the Mobile Force after its arrival in Cairo in October, and it was used as the nucleus of the new division. Theoretical and organisational work took place over the following months, before the first desert exercises were conducted in March 1939. Field training was limited by vehicle shortages and tanks restricted on how many miles they could traverse due to the same issues that the Mobile Force had encountered six months prior. With desert training concluded, the formation returned to Cairo where indoor exercises were held over the summer, while the higher ranks examined and refined the division's administration and logistical issues and explored desert warfare principles.

During 1939, the Mobile Division (Egypt) was renamed as the Armoured Division (Egypt), while the Cairo Cavalry Brigade became the Light Armoured Brigade (Egypt). The 7th Hussars were re-equipped with the Light Tank Mk VI, and handed over their old tanks to the 8th Hussars. Additional armoured cars were delivered to the 11th Hussars, while the divisional artillery was provided with modern 25-pounder gun-howitzers. The 1st Battalion (Mk VI light tanks) and the 6th Battalion (light tanks and obsolete Vickers Medium Mark II), Royal Tank Corps, were assigned to the division's newly formed Heavy Armoured Brigade (Egypt) (later the 4th Armoured Brigade), and started to receive modern Cruiser Mk I tanks in October 1939 to replace the medium tanks. (Note: Cruiser tanks were intended to be faster moving and more heavily armoured than a light tank. They were equipped with a machine gun and a gun that was effective against other tanks. Their primary role was to engage and destroy opposing armoured forces. The main weapon was a 2-pounder anti-tank gun, which was only supplied with armour-piercing rounds. This meant cruiser tanks were ineffective against entrenched infantry or for suppressing hostile artillery.)

When tensions in Europe reached a boiling point, in late August and just prior to the outbreak of the Second World War in September, the division was again deployed into the Western Desert. In December, with Italy having not joined the war, the formation returned to Cairo to resume training. The training conducted over the course of the year earned Hobart, and the division, the praise of his immediate superior, Major-General Richard O'Connor (commander, Western Desert Force), who stated it was the best trained formation he had ever seen. Similar plaudits came from Lieutenant-General Henry Maitland Wilson (Commander-in-Chief British Troops in Egypt), O'Connor's superior. An exercise in October, however, resulted in a public reprimand for Hobart due to errors made. In November, Hobart was dismissed by General Archibald Wavell (Commander-in-Chief Middle East Command and who oversaw Wilson) and ordered back to the UK. Hobart's biography suggested that the dismissal was the result of long held animosities between Hobart and the upper echelons of the British Army; and noted that while Wavell may not have held direct issues with Hobart, he would have been motivated to ensure that there was good working relationship between the various commanders that he oversaw.

Major-General Michael O'Moore Creagh, the Inspector of the Royal Armoured Corps, was given command of the division on 4 December 1939 as Hobart's replacement. Two months later, on 16 February 1940, further nomenclature changes took place. The formation was renamed as the 7th Armoured Division, the Heavy Armoured Brigade (Egypt) became the 4th Heavy Armoured Brigade, and the Light Armoured Brigade (Egypt) was redesignated as the 7th Light Armoured Brigade. The two armoured brigades dropped the heavy and light descriptives on 14 April. During April 1940, the War Office set out an organisation for armoured divisions that stated such formations should have 340 tanks. During this period, the 7th Armoured Division had just 65 cruiser tanks, with eight not equipped with their required anti-tank weapons. The same month, the division started to return to Mersa Matruh. Training continued for the majority, while the 11th Hussars moved close to the Frontier Wire on the Egypt-Libyan border, where they started reconnaissance of Italian positions.

=== Insignia ===
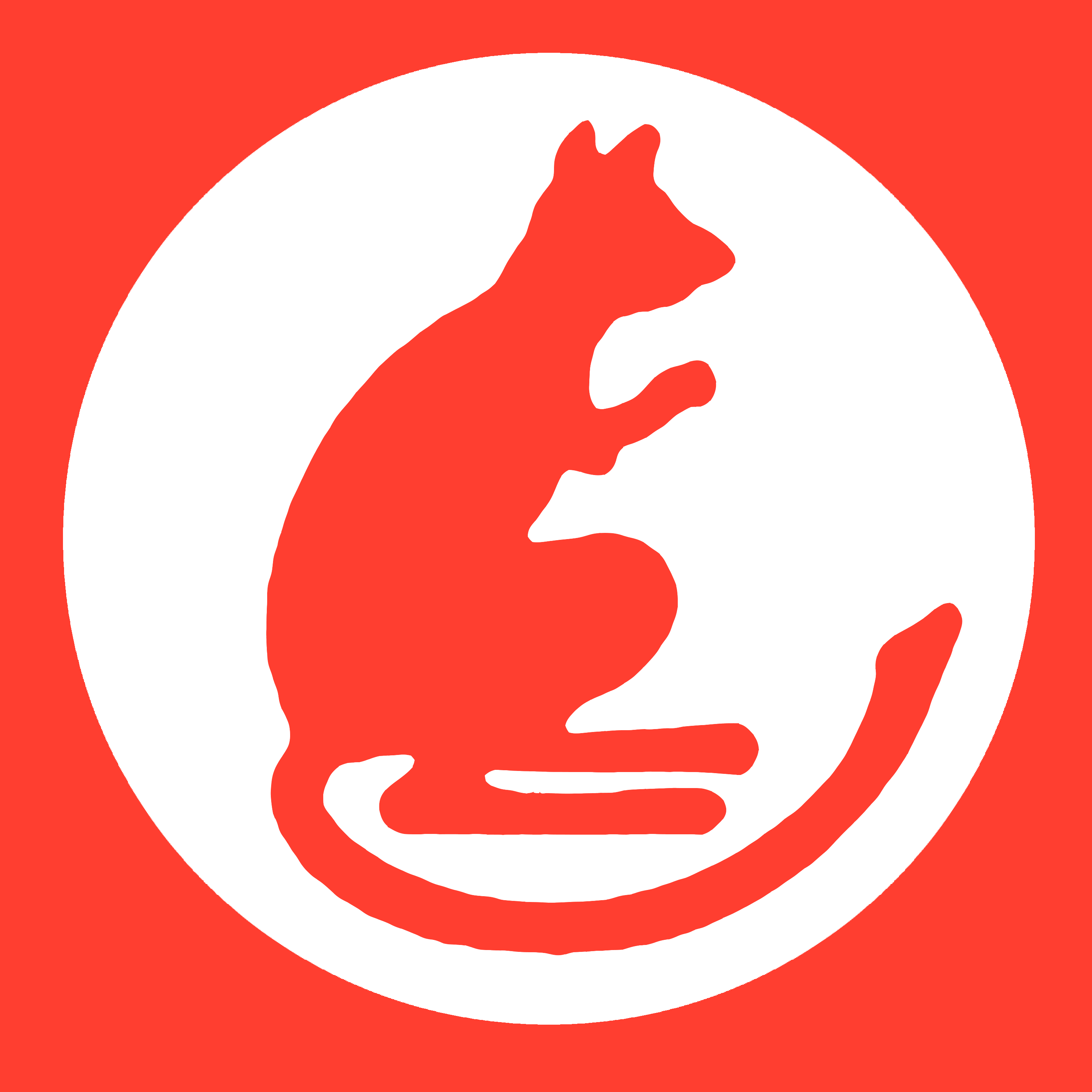
The first divisional insignia to use a jerboa, c.1940

The initial divisional insignia was similar to that used by the 7th Division during the First World War: A white circle, but on a red background rather than the First World War-era black background. In early 1940, the Jerboa (also known as a desert rat) was added to the design. While primarily red, the Imperial War Museum highlighted that pink variations may have existed. The design was used on vehicles from its inception, but there is no evidence that it was worn on uniforms until at least 1943. Then, only a single photograph depicts such and it is of the commanding officer. It is believed that the insignia was worn commonly on uniforms starting in 1944, and after the division arrived in the UK.

Most sources concur that the jerboa design was created during Creagh's tenure; that he felt something representative was needed to be added to the white circle and chose the desert rat. His wife then went to the Cairo zoo and sketched the first draft. Rea Leakey, who was the division's intelligence officer (GSO 3) at the time, claimed in his memoir that he and Hobart conversed about his pet jerboa. When he informed Hobart that they were called desert rats, Hobart decided to use that as the nickname for the division. George Forty, who edited the memoir, included a contradictory note that disputed Leakey's version of events and explained the story surrounding Creagh and his wife at the zoo. (Note: Len Burritt, who was a divisional headquarters wireless operator in 1940, alleged that he coined the nickname desert rats, talked Creagh out of applying the name Jerboa Division, and was presented with the first handmade insignia in 1940 after being dubbed "the first Desert Rat" by Creagh.)

== Second World War ==
=== North Africa ===
On 10 June 1940, Italy entered the Second World War against the Allies. In response, the 1st KRRC, the 7th, and the 11th Hussars patrolled the border and then crossed into Italian territory the next day and took 70 prisoners. The Italian border forts Capuzzo and Maddalena were quickly taken, and various small unit actions inflicted the loss of 24 armoured cars and several hundred casualties on the Italians. The first tank-on-tank clash for the division occurred on 16 June, when a force of 12 Italian light tanks were engaged and destroyed. However, these actions did not hinder the Italian build-up, and they soon retook Capuzzo and engaged in their own reconnaissance efforts. While more of the division's tank units were initially moved forward, it was decided to avoid mechanical attrition and the majority were pulled back to the Mersa Matruh area. This left one tank regiment along with the 1st KRRC, joined by two additional infantry battalions, and several batteries from the division's artillery to monitor a 60 mi (97 km) section of the border. Their instructions were to harass any Italian probes and to attempt to delay, but not become seriously engaged with, any offensive move. The 11th Hussars were allowed to continue their long-range efforts into Italian territory. (Note: The 1KRRC were joined by the 3rd Battalion, Coldstream Guards and the 2nd Battalion, The Rifle Brigade.) Between 11 June and 9 September, 3,500 Italian casualties were inflicted for the loss of 150 of the division's personnel. The tank strength of the division had also rose to 85 cruisers by September, although 15 were being repaired and wear and tear issues impacted the rest.

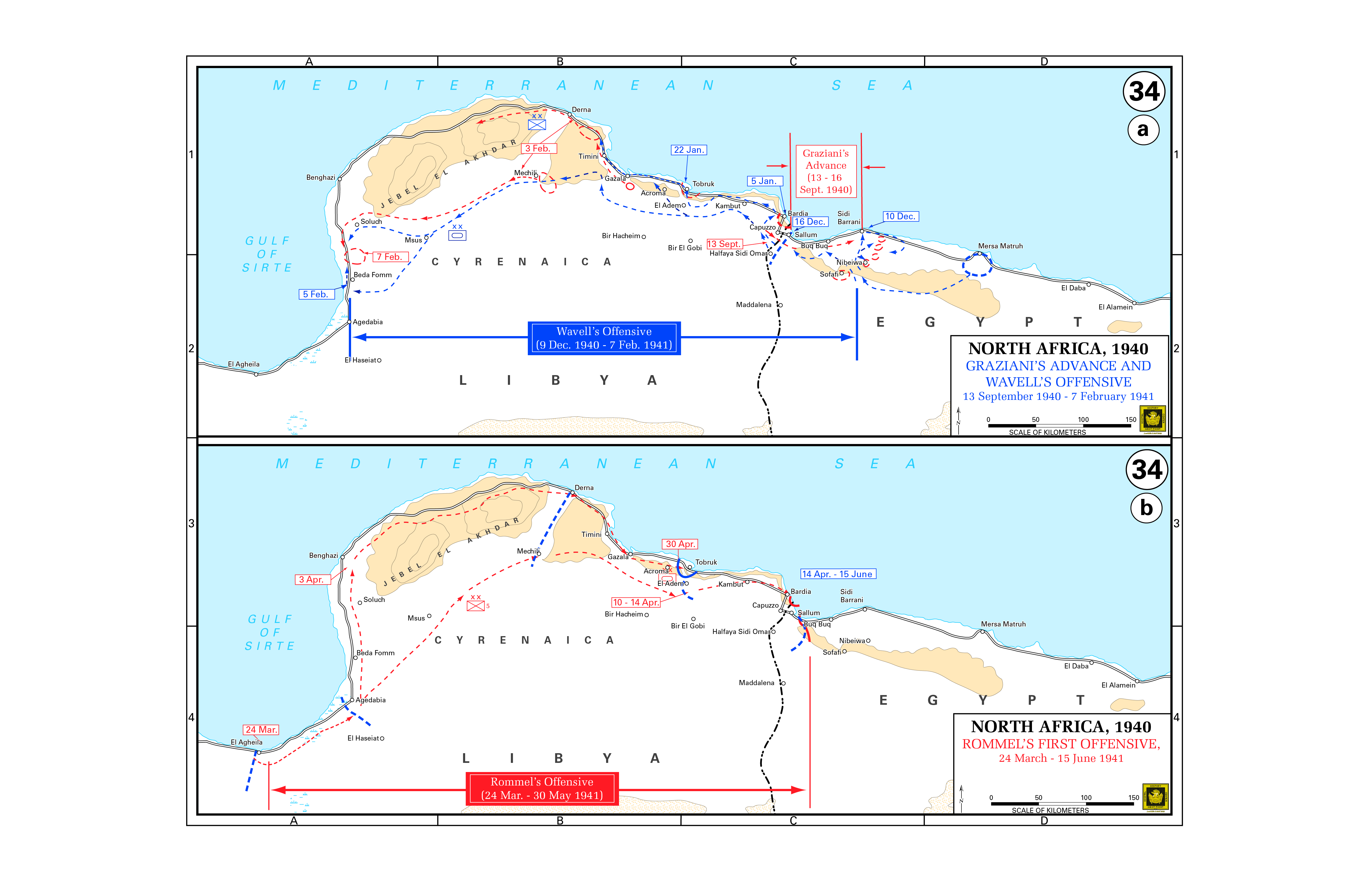
A map of the Western Desert, detailing they key battles and movements between 13 September 1940–30 May 1941 (Click to enlarge).

On 13 September, the Italians invaded Egypt with a force of five divisions supplemented by a tank group. In accordance with their instructions, the division's forward elements engaged and harassed the Italians while falling back to avoid prolonged engagements. By 16 September, the Italians had reached Sidi Barrani. They halted to improve the infrastructure behind them and constructed a series of fortified camps. The 7th Armoured Division regrouped at Mersa Matruh, then spent the following two months reconnoitering the Italian positions. Towards the end of August, and prior to the Italian invasion, reinforcements and supplies were dispatched to Egypt from the UK. This included artillery, spare parts, and around 100 tanks for the division; a mix of light tanks and cruisers split between two armoured regiments. Their arrival in early October doubled the 7th Armoured Division's strength. (Note: The convoy also included an armoured regiment outfitted with Matilda II infantry tanks, 48 anti-tank guns, 20 light anti-tank guns, 48 artillery pieces, 250 anti-tank rifles, 500 Bren light machine guns, 50,000 anti-tank mines, 300 tons of spare parts and other required equipment, tens of thousands of artillery rounds, and one million rounds of ammunition.)

On 9 December, the Western Desert Force launched its counterattack. The division protected the flank of the initial attack, then provided more direct support over the following days and assisted in the capture of a large number of Italian troops. They then pursued the Italians into Libya and took up position between Tobruk and Bardia. In January, as Bardia was captured, the division advanced on then encircled Tobruk. In February, with Italian forces in retreat across Libya, the division crossed the desert south of the Jebel Akhdar and captured Beda Fomm, south of Benghazi. On 7 February, as the tanks were unable to travel fast enough, the manoeuvre was led by an ad hoc brigade of armoured cars, towed artillery and infantry, which completed the trip in 30 hours, that cut off the Italian retreat and destroyed the Italian Tenth Army. Lieutenant Colonel John Combe led this ad hoc group, which was known as "Combe Force" after him. After this, the tanks of the 7th Armoured Division, after eight months of fighting, needed a complete overhaul and the division was withdrawn to Cairo and temporarily ceased to be available as a fighting formation being replaced in the line by the 2nd Armoured Division. Compass ultimately captured 130,000 Italians.

The Italians had proven so weak that Hitler was forced to send the Afrika Korps, under Erwin Rommel, as reinforcements. In April 1941, the Allied troops in Tobruk were cut off by the Germans and Italians.

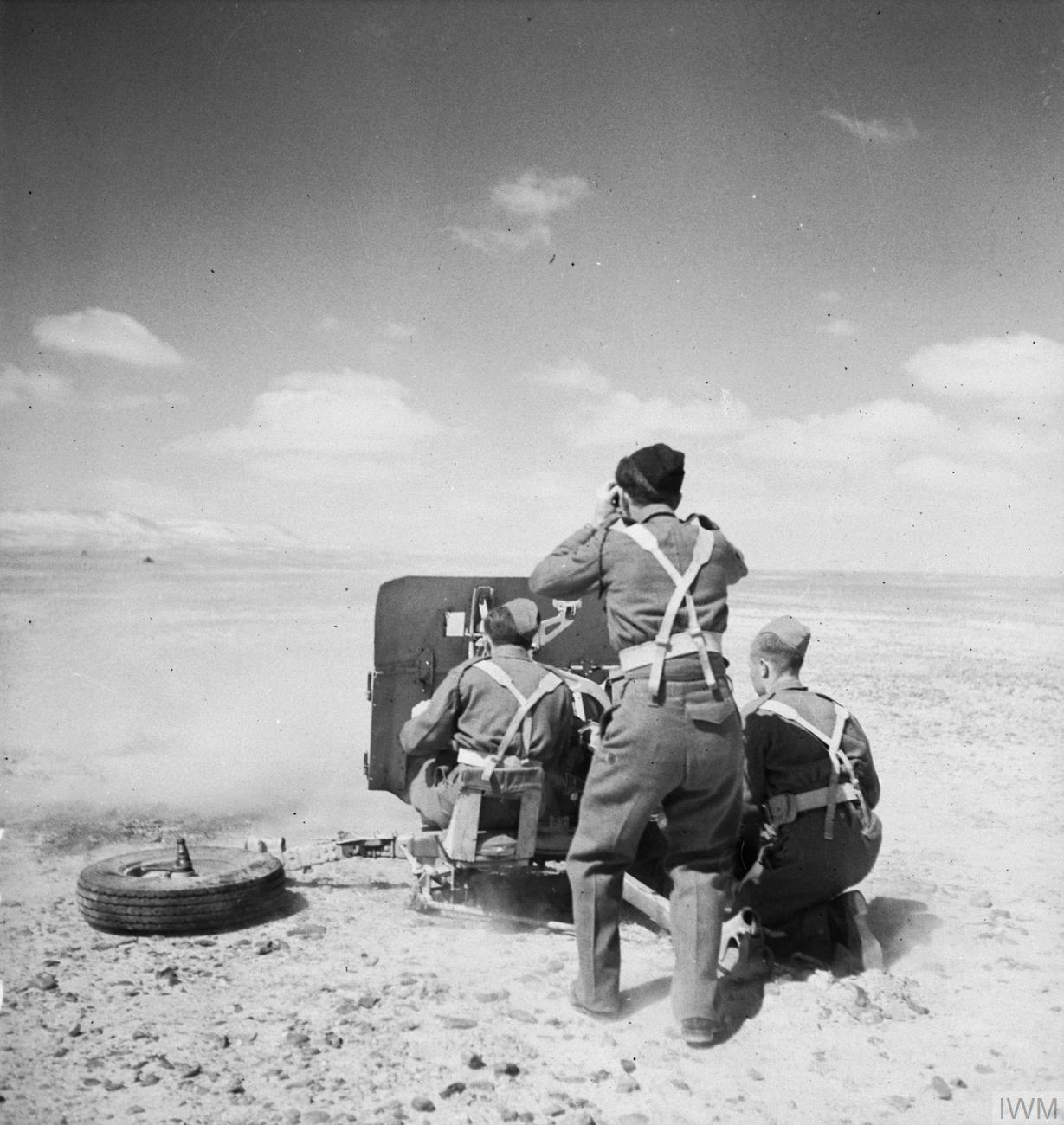
A 2-pounder anti-tank gun being manned by members of the 2nd Battalion, Rifle Brigade (The Prince Consort's Own), 24 March 1942.

On 7 June, the division was again prepared for battle as part of Operation Battleaxe, having received new tanks and additional personnel. In the attack plan for Battleaxe, the 7th force was divided between the Coast Force and Escarpment Force. However, this Allied push failed, and the 7th Armoured Division was forced to withdraw on the third day of fighting. On 18 November, as part of Operation Crusader the whole of the 7th Armoured Division was concentrated on breaking through. They faced only the weakened 21st Panzer Division. However, the XXX Corps commander, Lieutenant-General Willoughby Norrie, aware that the 7th Armoured Division was down to 200 tanks, decided on caution. During the wait, in the early afternoon of 22 November, Rommel attacked Sidi Rezegh with the 21st Panzer and captured the airfield. Fighting was desperate and gallant: for his actions during these two days of fighting, Brigadier Jock Campbell, commanding the 7th Support Group, was awarded the Victoria Cross. However, the 21st Panzer, despite being considerably weaker in armour, proved superior in its combined arms tactics, pushing the 7th Armoured back with a further 50 tanks lost (mainly from the 22nd Armoured Brigade).

On 27 June 1942, elements of the 7th Armoured Division, along with units of the 3rd The King's Own Hussars, suffered one of the worst friendly fire incidents when they were attacked by a group of Royal Air Force (RAF) Vickers Wellington medium bombers during a two-hour raid near Mersa Matruh, Egypt. Over 359 troops were killed and 560 others were wounded.

The Western Desert Force later became HQ XIII Corps, one of the major parts of the British Eighth Army which, from August 1942 was commanded by Lieutenant-General Sir Bernard Montgomery. The 7th Armoured Division took part in most of the major battles of the North African Campaign, including both battles of El Alamein (the First Battle of El Alamein in July 1942, which stopped the Axis advance, and the Second Battle of El Alamein in October/November 1942, which turned the tide of the war in North Africa).

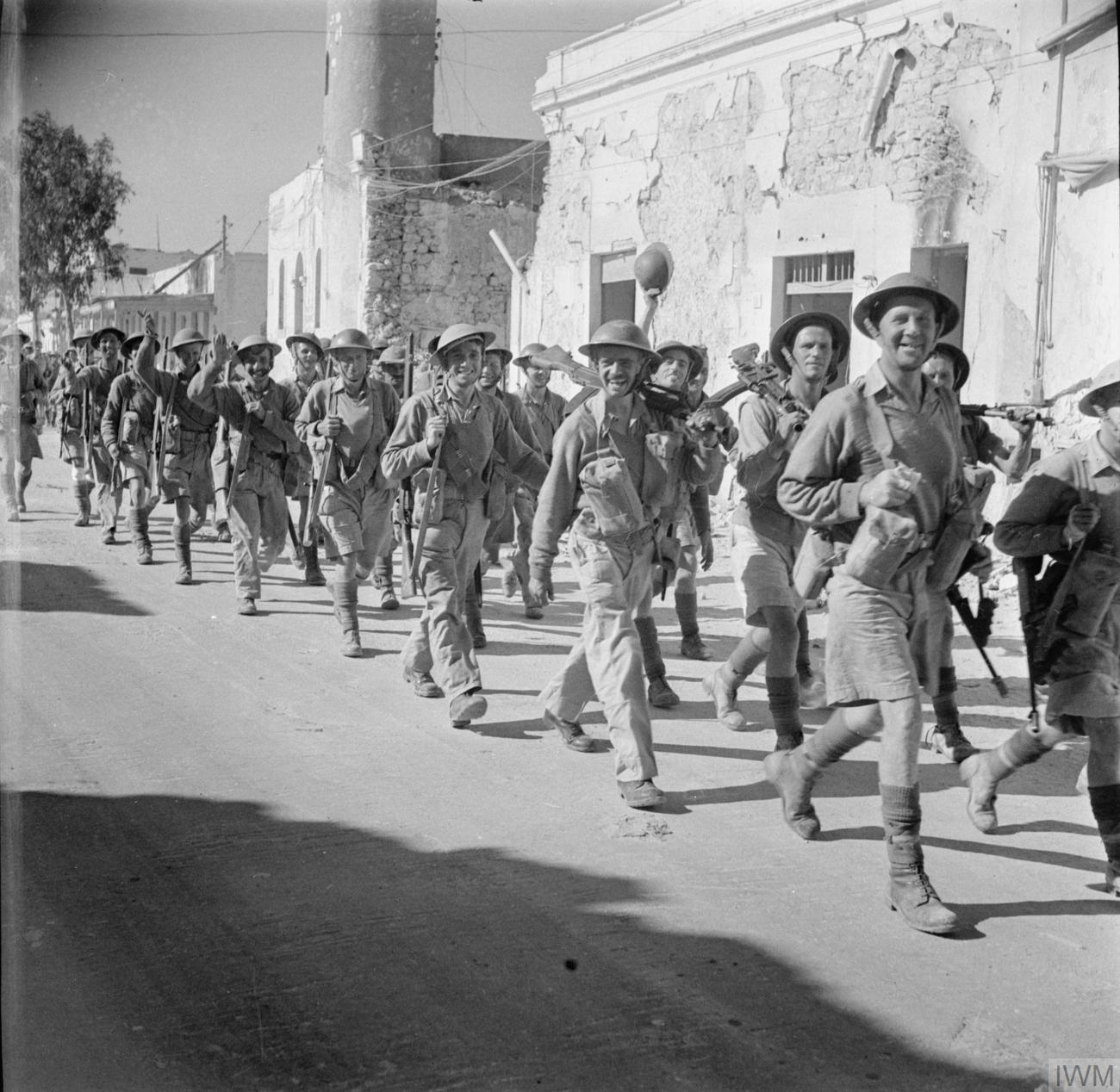
Infantrymen of the 1/6th Battalion, Queen's Royal Regiment (West Surrey) marching into Tobruk, Libya, 18 November 1942.

The 7th Armoured Division, now consisting of the 22nd Armoured and 131st Infantry Brigades and commanded by Major General John Harding, fought in many major battles of the Tunisian Campaign, taking part in the Battle of El Agheila in December. By January 1943 the Eighth Army had reached Tripoli where a victory parade was held, with the 7th Armoured Division taking part. Among the witnesses was Winston Churchill, the British Prime Minister, and General Sir Alan Brooke, the Chief of the Imperial General Staff (CIGS).

The division, now commanded by Major General George Erskine after Harding was severely injured in January, next took part in the Battle of Medenine, followed by the Battle of the Mareth Line in March. In late April, towards the end of the campaign, the 7th Armoured Division was transferred to IX Corps of the British First Army for the assault on Medjez El Bab. The attack was successful, with the 7th Armoured Division competing with the 6th Armoured Division of the First Army in a race to the city of Tunis, with 'B' Squadron of the 11th Hussars being first into the city on the afternoon of 7 May, followed closely by the 22nd Armoured Brigade and the 131st Brigade. The fighting in North Africa came to an end just days later, with almost 250,000 Axis soldiers surrendering to the Allies and becoming POWs.

=== Italy ===
The division was not an assault force in the invasion of Sicily, instead remaining in Homs, Syria for training in amphibious warfare, but did participate in the early stages of the Italian campaign.

The 7th Armoured Division came ashore at Salerno, on 15 September 1943, to help repel heavy German counterattacks during the Battle for the Salerno beachhead (Operation Avalanche). Shortly after landing on the 18th the 131st (Queen's) Infantry Brigade (which consisted of the 1/5th, 1/6th and 1/7th Territorial battalions of the Queen's Royal Regiment) relieved its 'sister' duplicate, the 169th (Queen's) Infantry Brigade, (consisting of 2/5th, 2/6th and 2/7th Queen's, all formed in 1939), which was part of the 56th (London) Infantry Division, and had been in continuous combat since 9 September. The assembly of six battalions of a single regiment has since been considered a unique moment in the regiment's history. The 169th Brigade was commanded at the time by Brigadier Lewis Lyne, who would later command the 7th Armoured Division from November 1944 onwards.

Then, it drove on and took Naples. Used to fighting in the desert, the division had to adjust to the confined Italian roads.

There could not have been a greater contrast to the desert. We struggled forward, blown bridges and muddy vineyards causing more delay than opposition from the enemy.

The division crossed the river Volturno in southern Italy, constructing a pontoon bridge.

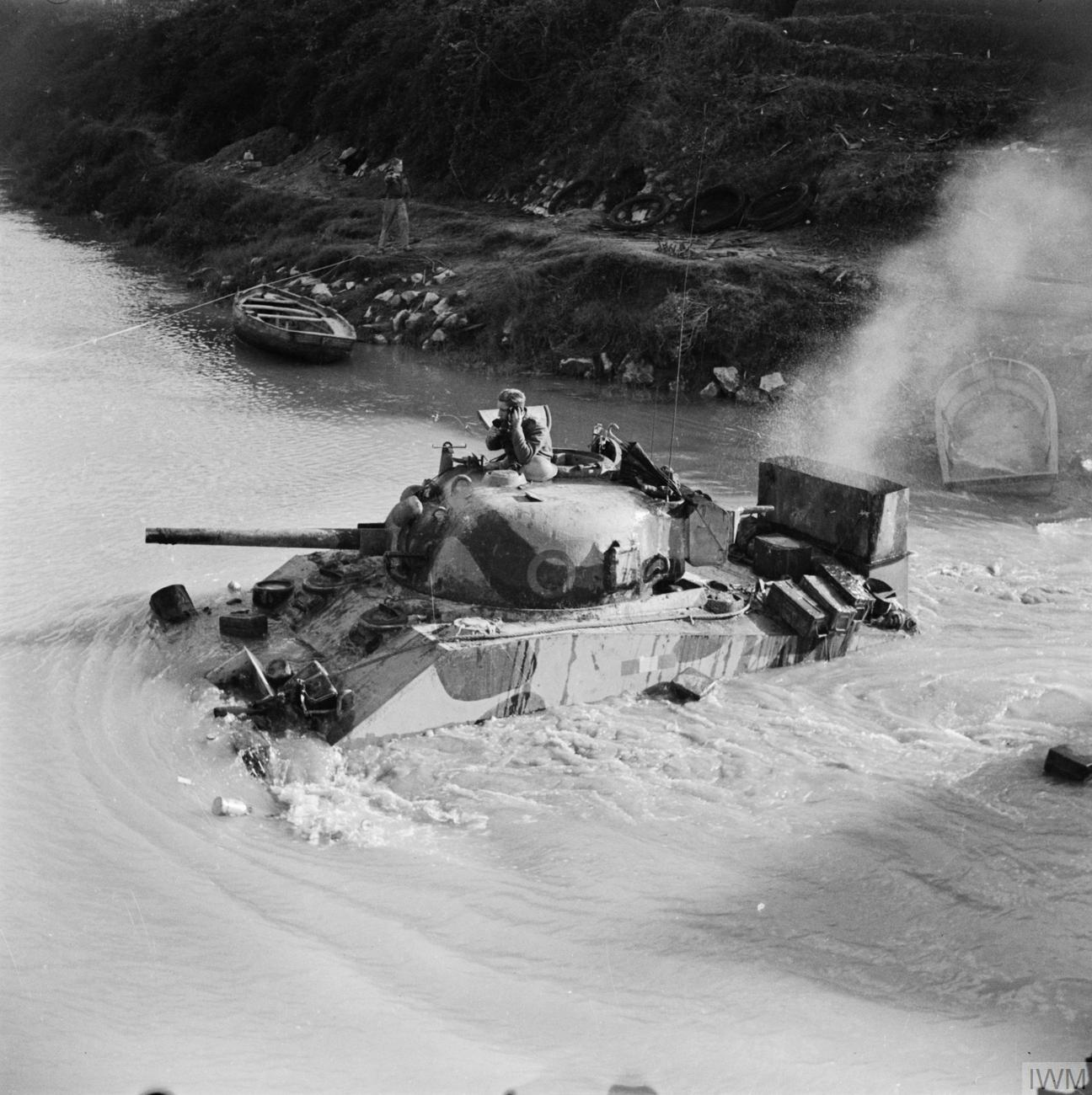
A Sherman tank of the 4th County of London Yeomanry fording the Volturno river at Grazzanise, Italy, 17 October 1943.

On the wishes of the British Eighth Army commander, General Montgomery, the 7th Armoured Division was recalled to the United Kingdom, along with the 4th and 8th Armoured Brigades, and the 50th (Northumbrian) and 51st (Highland) Infantry Divisions, all of which had seen extensive service alongside the 7th Armoured Division in the Mediterranean and Middle East, to participate in the invasion of North Western Europe with the British Second Army. The 7th Armoured, handing over its battered vehicles and equipment to the recently arrived 5th Canadian (Armoured) Division, left Italy in late December 1943, arriving in Glasgow, Scotland in early January 1944.

=== North West Europe ===
Order of battle 1944-1945.

In November 1943, the division left Italy for the United Kingdom, with the last units arriving on 7 January 1944. The division was re-equipped with the new Cromwell cruiser tanks and in April and May received 36 Sherman Vc Fireflies. Each troop now had three 75 mm gun Cromwells and a 17-pounder gun Firefly. The Desert Rats were the only British armoured division to use the Cromwell as their main battle tank.

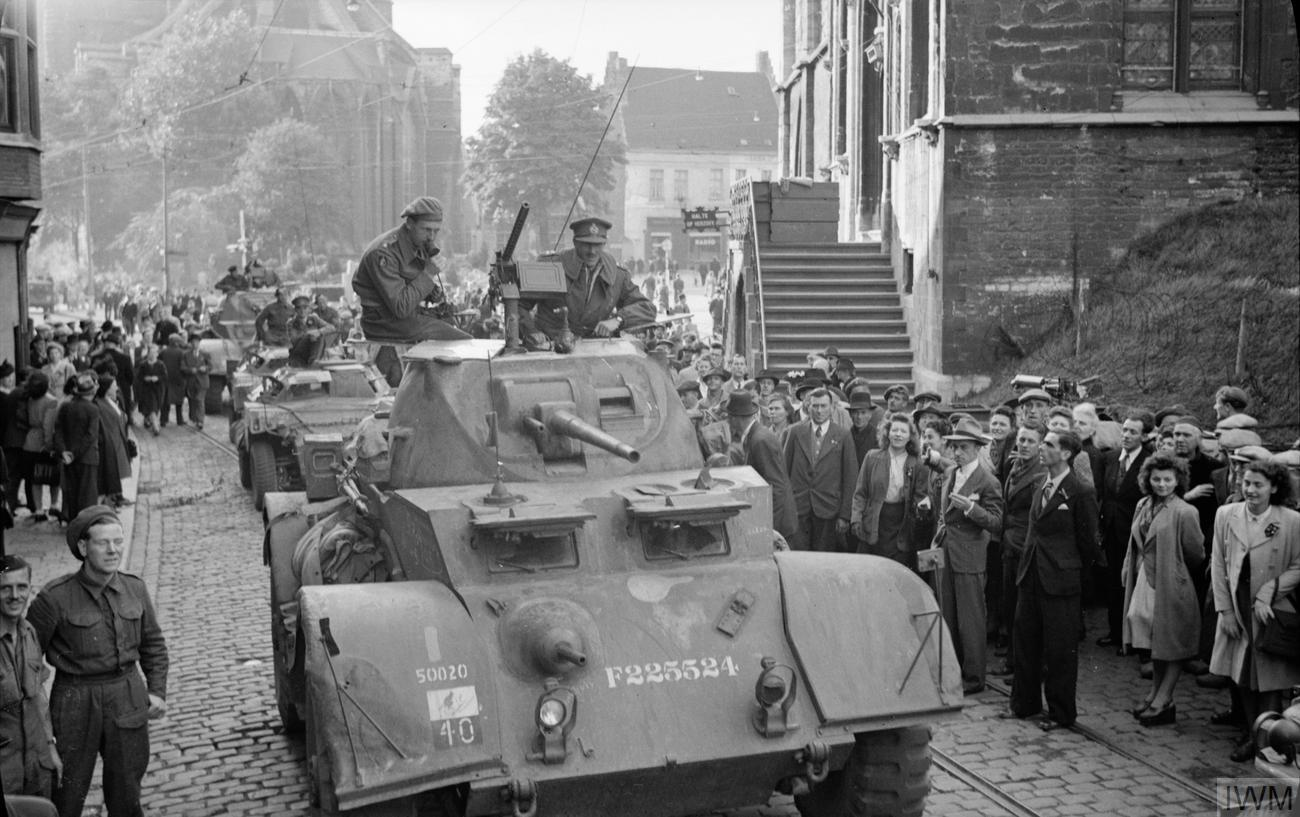
Major-General Gerald Lloyd-Verney, GOC 7th Armoured Division, enters Ghent in his Staghound armoured car, 8 September 1944.

The 22nd Armoured Brigade embarked on 4 June, and most of the division landed on Gold Beach by the end of 7 June, a day after the initial landings. 7th Armoured initially took part in Operation Perch and Operation Goodwood, two operations that formed part of the Battle for Caen. During Perch, the division was to spearhead one arm of a pincer attack to capture the city. Due to a change in plan, elements of the division engaged tanks of the Panzer-Lehr-Division and the Heavy SS-Panzer Battalion 101 in the Battle of Villers-Bocage and were repulsed. Following the capture of Caen, the division took part in Operation Spring, which was intended to keep the German forces pinned to the British front away from the Americans who were launching Operation Cobra, and then Operation Bluecoat, an attack to support the American break-out and intercept German reinforcements moving to stop it. After the Battle of the Falaise Gap, which saw most of the German Army in Normandy destroyed, the 7th Armoured Division then took part in the Allied advance from Paris to the Rhine.

The division's performance in Normandy and the rest of France has been called into question and it has been claimed they did not match those of its earlier campaigns. In early August 1944, Major General George Erskine, who had commanded the division since January 1943, Brigadier William Hinde, commanding the 22nd Armoured Brigade, and up to 100 other officers of the division were removed from their positions and reassigned. Erskine was replaced as GOC by Major General Gerald Lloyd-Verney. Historians largely agree that this was a consequence of the "failure" at Villers-Bocage and had been planned since that battle. Historian Daniel Taylor is of the opinion that the battle's result provided an excuse and that the sackings took place to "demonstrate that the army command was doing something to counteract the poor public opinion of the conduct of the campaign". Historian and former British Army officer Mungo Melvin has commented approvingly of the 7th Armoured Division's institution of a flexible combined arms structure, which other British armoured divisions did not adopt until after Operation Goodwood.

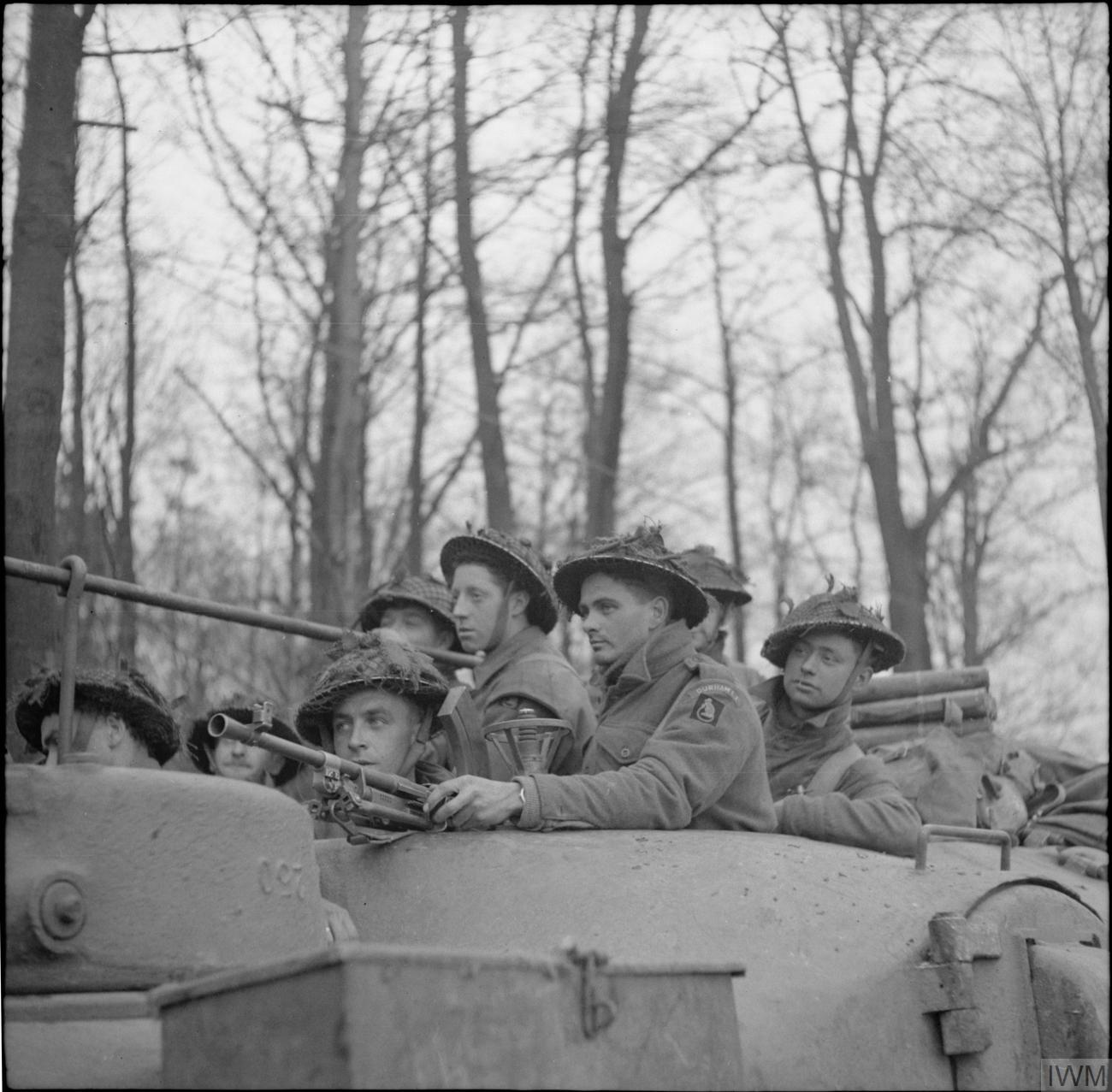
Ram Kangaroo personnel carriers carrying troops of the 9th Battalion, Durham Light Infantry near Weske, 31 March 1945.

The replacement of Erskine in August did not change the performance of the division. In November 1944, Lloyd-Verney was relieved by Major General Lyne, after he "was unable to cure the division's bad habits well enough to satisfy Montgomery and Dempsey". There is almost no doubt that the division was suffering from collective and cumulative battle fatigue. As Lloyd-Verney put it, with some prescience: "There is no doubt that familiarity with war does not make one more courageous. One becomes cunning and from cunning to cowardice is but a short step." This was not an isolated incident: the 51st (Highland) Infantry Division and several other veteran formations Montgomery had brought back from the Mediterranean experienced similar difficulties, although not the 50th (Northumbrian) Infantry Division, which performed well throughout the Normandy Campaign.

Following the advance across France, the division took part in the Allied advance through Belgium and the Netherlands, liberating Ghent on 6 September. The division then took part in the advance to and securing of the River Maas, where the division, now commanded by Major-General Lewis Lyne, a highly experienced commander, was slightly reorganized, with many experienced men who had been overseas with the division for five years returning home. In January 1945 the division, with the 8th Armoured Brigade and 155th Infantry Brigade (from the 52nd (Lowland) Infantry Division) under command, took part in Operation Blackcock to clear the Roer Triangle. The division had a short rest for training in late February. This was followed by Operation Plunder: the 7th Armoured Division crossed the River Rhine near Xanten and Wesel and advanced northeast. On 16 April 1945, the 7th Armoured Division liberated Stalag 11B in Fallingbostel, which was the first prisoner-of-war camp to be liberated. The 7th Armoured Division's last action of the war was the battle for the German city of Hamburg.

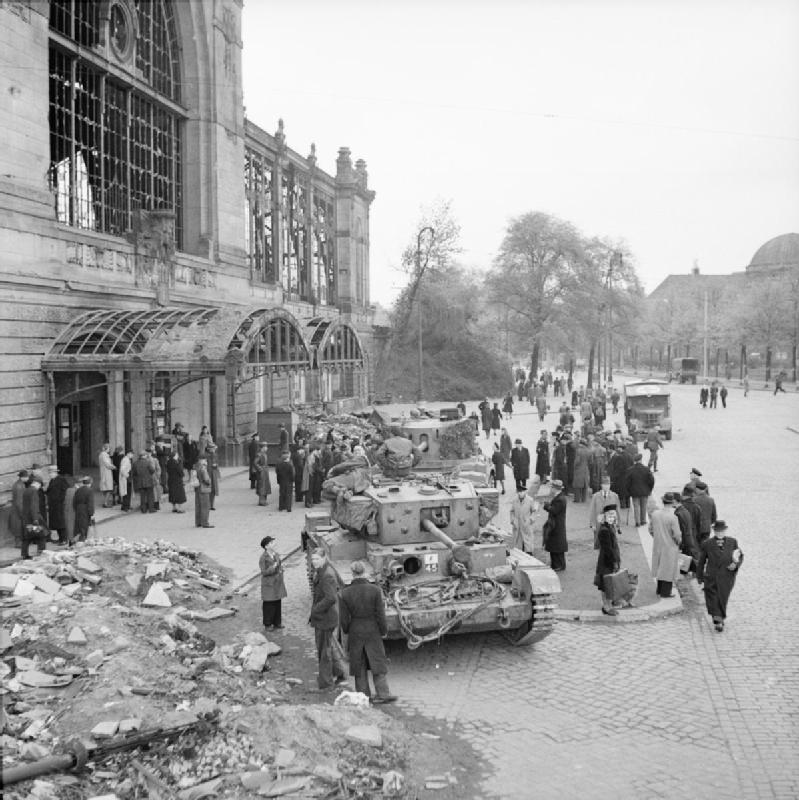
Cromwell tank with Challenger tank behind of 8th Hussars, 7th Armoured Division, outside Hamburg Dammtor station, 5 May 1945.

In July 1945 the 7th Armoured Division took part in the 1945 British victory parade in Berlin. Among the many witnesses of the parade were British Prime Minister Winston Churchill, who was particularly fond of the division, Field Marshal Alan Brooke, the Chief of the Imperial General Staff and Field Marshal Montgomery.

== Post war ==
During the summer of 1945, the BAOR reorganised and disbanded its corps headquarters. These were replaced by new formations based around a divisional headquarters. This resulted in the creation of the 7th Armoured Division District, which was headquartered at Bad Rothenfelde. (Note: XII Corps was disbanded in June 1945, followed by I, VIII, and XXX Corps in July.) The division was reformed when Hannover District became the 7th Armoured Division. The division remained part of the BAOR until April 1958, when it was redesignated as the 5th Division. While the division ceased to exist, its traditions and iconic nickname were maintained by 7th Armoured Brigade.

A monument to commemorate the 7th Armoured was erected at Brandon in Thetford Forest where the division trained prior to D-day.

== Notable personnel ==
- Field Marshal Michael Carver, Baron Carver – GS01
- Major-General John Combe- initially 11th Hussars, later staff officer
- Second Lieutenant Dan Ranfurly – chronicled by his wife Hermione Ranfurly's book To War With Whitaker: The Wartime Diaries of the Countess of Ranfurly, 1939–1945

== See also ==
- List of British divisions in World War II
- British Armoured formations of World War II
- British Army Order of Battle (September 1939)
- Jock column
- John Beeley
- George Ward Gunn

== Notes ==
Footnotes

Citations
