= Jock Campbell (British Army officer) =

British Army officer and recipient of the Victoria Cross

Major-General Jock Campbell VC DSO & Bar MC
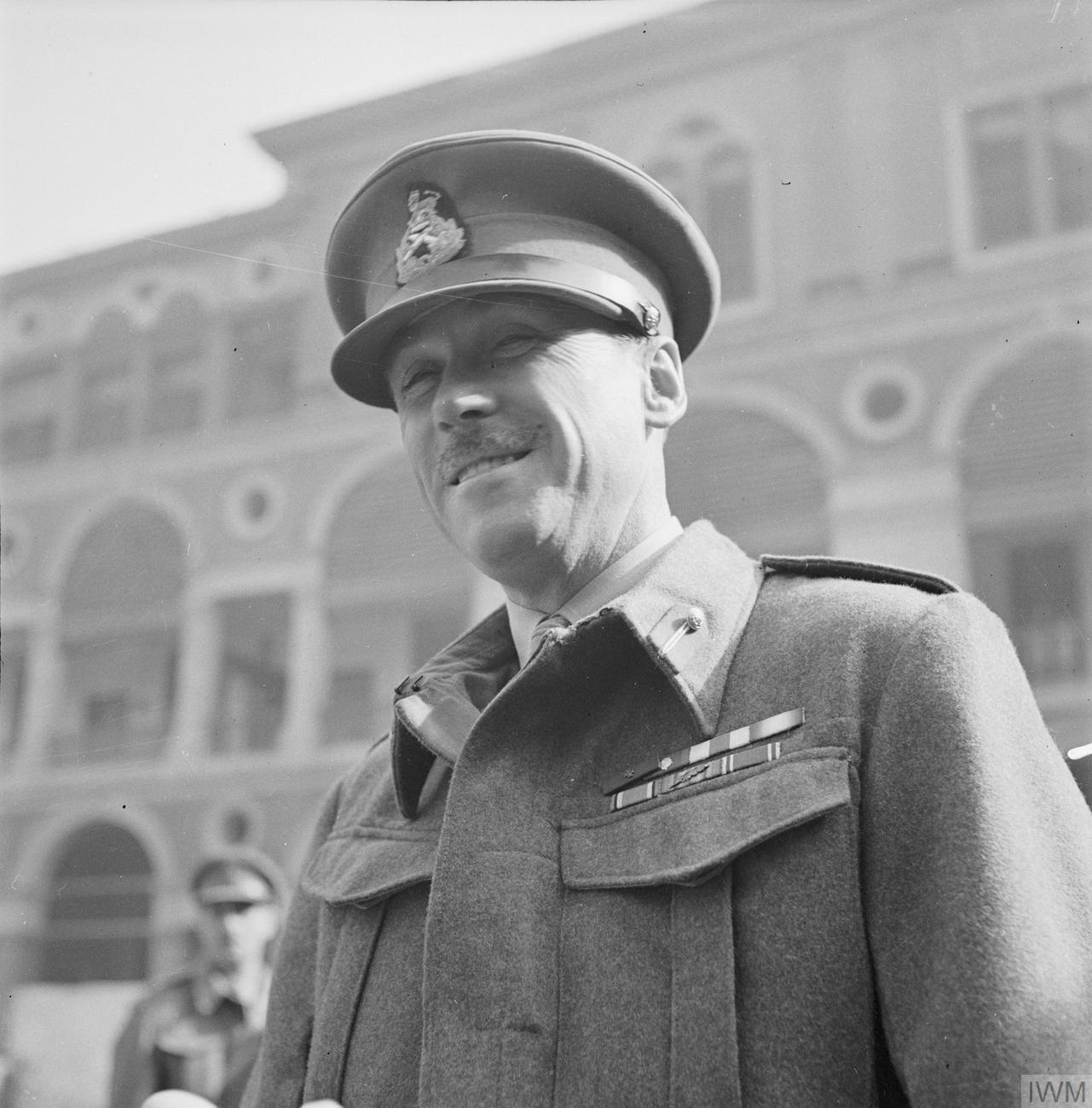
- Major-General Jock Campbell after being presented with the VC by General Sir Claude Auchinleck, 1941
- Born: 10 January 1894; Thurso, Scotland
- Died: 26 February 1942 (aged 48) near Halfaya, North Africa
- Burial place: Cairo War Memorial Cemetery
- Military career
- Allegiance: United Kingdom
- Branch: British Army
- Service years: 1915–1942
- Rank: Major-General
- Nicknames: "Jock"
- Service number: 13594
- Units: Royal Horse Artillery
- Commands: 7th Armoured Division (1942); 7th Support Group (1941–1942)
- Conflicts: First World War; Second World War
- Awards: Victoria Cross; Distinguished Service Order & Bar; Military Cross; Mentioned in Despatches

Major-General John Charles Campbell, VC, DSO & Bar, MC (10 January 1894 – 26 February 1942), known as Jock Campbell, was a British Army officer and recipient of the Victoria Cross, the highest award for gallantry in the face of the enemy that can be awarded to British and Commonwealth forces.

== Early life and career ==
Campbell was born in Thurso and educated at Sedbergh School. At the beginning of the First World War in August 1914 he joined the Honourable Artillery Company, and, after graduating from the Royal Military Academy, Woolwich, was commissioned into the Royal Field Artillery in July 1915. Serving in France, he was wounded twice and ended the war as a captain, having earned the Military Cross (MC).

Between the wars (see the interwar period) he became a first class horseman (in the top flight at both polo and hunting), while continuing to serve as an artillery officer.

== Second World War ==
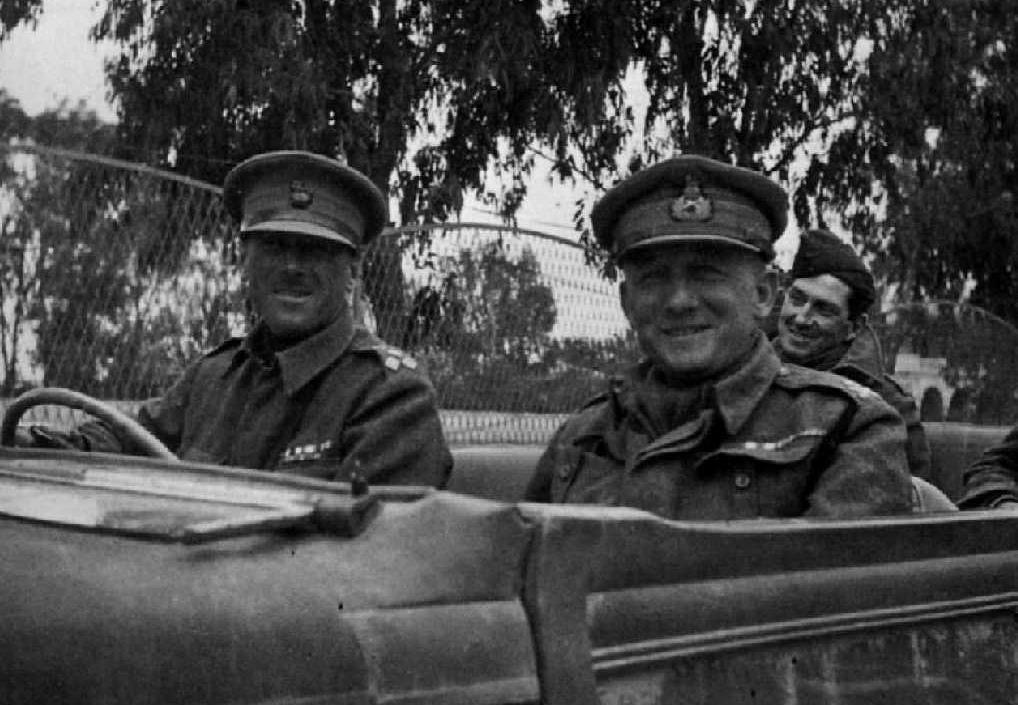
Brigadier Jock Campbell of the 7th Armoured Division driving his commanding officer, Major-General William Gott, pictured here between 1940 and 1942.

When the Second World War broke out Campbell was 45 years old and a major commanding a battery in the 4th Regiment Royal Horse Artillery in Egypt. When Italy declared war in June 1940, Campbell, by then a lieutenant colonel, was commanding the artillery component of 7th Armoured Division's Support Group under Brigadier William Gott. The British Army was heavily outnumbered by the Italians, so General Archibald Wavell formulated a plan with his senior commanders to retain the initiative by harassing the enemy using mobile all-arms flying columns. Campbell's brilliant command of one of these columns led to their being given the generic name "Jock columns" (although it is unclear if the idea originated with Campbell or not).

During Operation Compass Campbell's guns played an important role in 7th Support Group's involvement in the decisive battle at Beda Fomm in February 1941 which led to the surrender of the Italian Tenth Army. In April 1941 Campbell was awarded the Distinguished Service Order (DSO), receiving a second award clasp shortly afterwards.

In September 1941 Gott was promoted to command 7th Armoured Division and Campbell took over command 7th Support Group as an acting brigadier. In November 1941 during Operation Crusader, 7th Support Group was occupying the airfield at Sidi Rezegh, south of Tobruk, together with 7th Armoured Brigade. On 21 November 1941 they were attacked by the two armoured divisions of the Afrika Korps. The British tanks suffered heavy losses but prevented the Germans taking the airfield. Brigadier Campbell's small force, holding important ground, was repeatedly attacked and wherever the fighting was hardest he was to be seen either on foot, in his open car or astride a tank. According to Alan Moorehead,

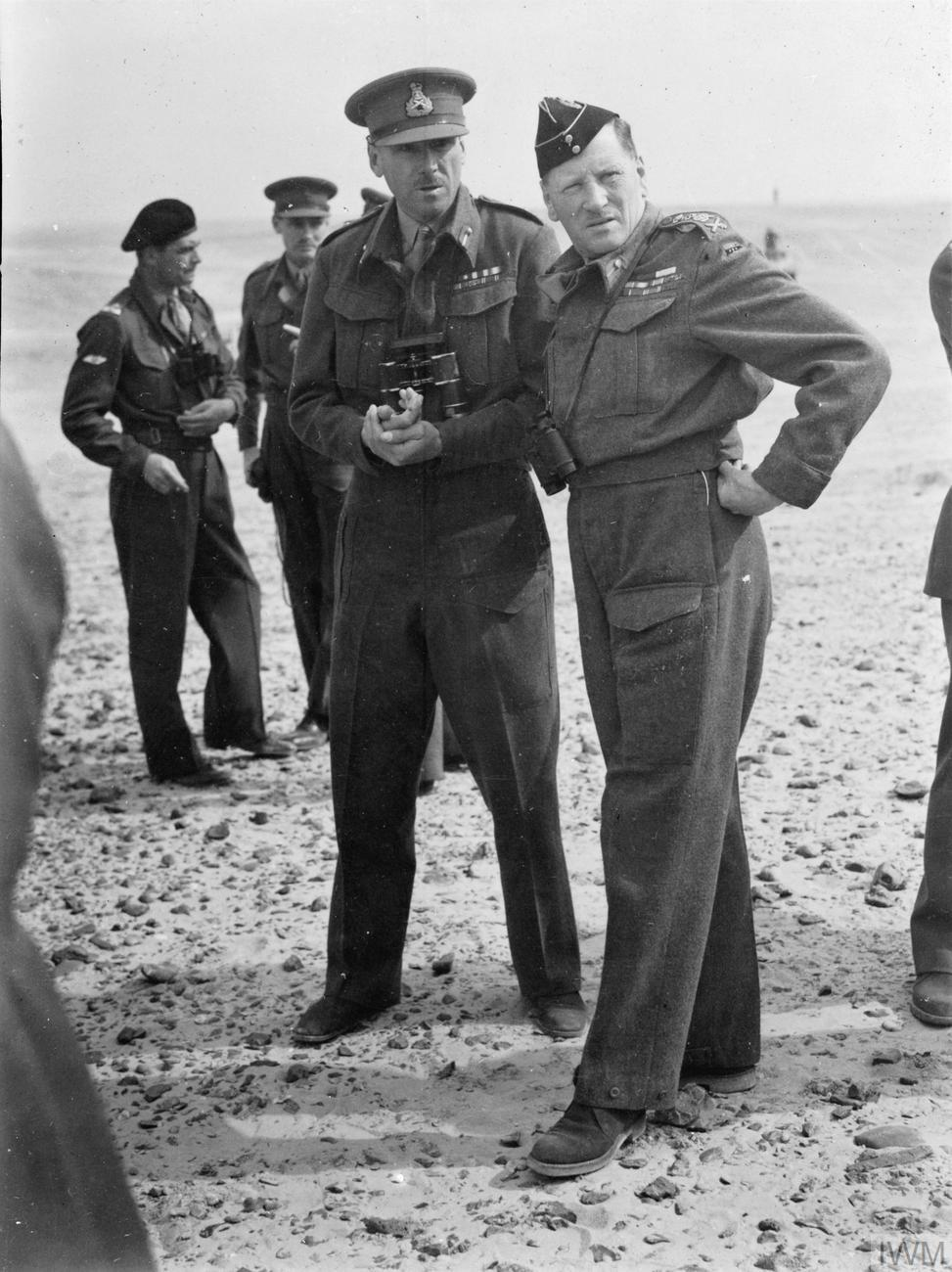
Campbell and Commander in Chief Auchinleck in the Western Desert.

He led his tanks into action riding in an open armoured car, and as he stood there, hanging on to its windscreen, a huge well-built man with the English officer's stiff good looks, he shouted, 'There they come, let them have it.' When the car began to fall behind, he leapt on to the side of a tank as it went forward and directed the battle from there ... They say that Campbell won the VC half a dozen times that day. The men loved this Elizabethan figure. He was the reality of all the pirate yarns and tales of high adventure, and in the extremes of fear and courage of the battle he had only courage. He went laughing into the fighting.

The following day he was again at the forefront, encouraging his troops through continued enemy attacks. He personally directed the fire of his batteries, and twice manned a gun himself to replace casualties. Though wounded, he refused to be evacuated during the final German attack. His leadership did much to maintain the fighting spirit of his men, and resulted in heavy casualties being inflicted upon the enemy. The fighting continued on 23 November, but with 7th Armoured Brigade destroyed and the 5th South African Infantry Brigade being decimated, Campbell withdrew the remains of his support group to the south. For his actions during the battle, Campbell was awarded the Victoria Cross.

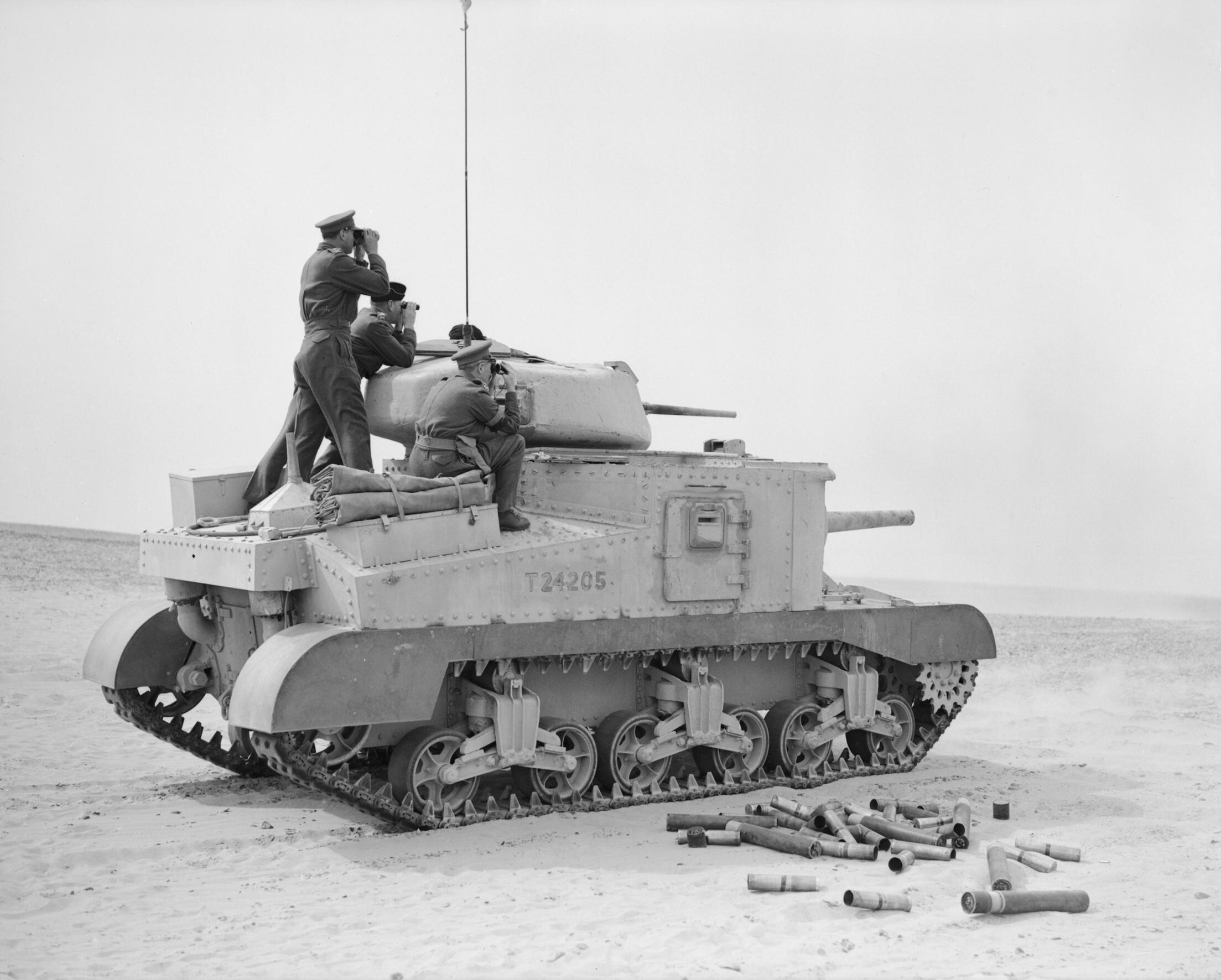
Campbell and Auchinleck watch for fall of shot from atop a newly arrived Grant tank.

He purportedly received a letter of congratulation from General Johann von Ravenstein, commander of the 21st Panzer Division, one of the armoured formations which Campbell had faced at Sidi Rezegh. When interviewed later as a prisoner of war, Ravenstein freely expressed his "greatest admiration" for Campbell's skill on "those hot days" and recalled "all the many iron that flew near the aerodrome around our ears".

In February 1942 Campbell was promoted Major-General and given command of 7th Armoured Division, while Gott was promoted from the 7th to lead XIII Corps.

Three weeks after his promotion Campbell was killed when his jeep overturned on a newly laid clay road. The driver of the jeep, Major Roy Farran, and the other passengers were thrown clear from the wreck and knocked unconscious. Farran had been Campbell's aide-de-camp, and later admitted considering suicide while waiting for medical help. During the Western Desert campaign Campbell was considered one of the finest commanders in the Eighth Army, an old desert hand who had been in North Africa from the start of the war. His loss was deeply felt. Alan Moorehead, a war correspondent who served throughout the war in the desert, described the impact that both Gott and Campbell had when visiting a hospital in Benghazi:'

Gott and Campbell together were a remarkable sight, both of them tall and heavily built, both soldiers who fought at the front alongside their men, both, as far as one could guess, indifferent to any form of high explosive. The sick men heaved themselves up on their elbows as the two leaders went down the ward. It was, in some ways, a pathetic little thing, that current enthusiasm that swept through the hospital and I do not know why I remember it so clearly. Still, there it was – the men still had their leaders and they were willing to fight their way to Tripoli if they could get there.

== Victoria Cross ==
His Victoria Cross is displayed at the Royal Artillery Museum, Woolwich, England. The citation for the award was published in the London Gazette on 30 January 1942, reading:

The KING has been graciously pleased to approve the award of the VICTORIA CROSS to

Brigadier (acting) John Charles Campbell, DSO, MC (135944), Royal Horse Artillery,

in recognition of most conspicuous gallantry and devotion to duty at Sidi Rezegh on the 21st and 22nd November, 1941.

On the 21st November Brigadier Campbell was commanding the troops, including one regiment of tanks, in the area of Sidi Rezegh ridge and the aerodrome. His small force holding this important ground was repeatedly attacked by large numbers of tanks and infantry. Wherever the situation was most difficult and the fighting hardest he was to be seen with his forward troops, either on his feet or in his open car. In this car he carried out several reconnaissances for counter-attacks by his tanks, whose senior officers had all become casualties early in the day. Standing in his car with a blue flag, this officer personally formed up tanks under close and intense fire from all natures of enemy weapons.

On the following day the enemy attacks were intensified and again Brigadier Campbell was always in the forefront of the heaviest fighting, encouraging his troops, staging counter-attacks with his remaining tanks and personally controlling the fire of his guns. On two occasions he himself manned a gun to replace casualties. During the final enemy attack on the 22nd November he was wounded, but continued most actively in the foremost positions, controlling the fire of batteries which inflicted heavy losses on enemy tanks at point blank range, and finally acted as loader to one of the guns himself.

Throughout these two days his magnificent example and his utter disregard of personal danger were an inspiration to his men and to all who saw him. His brilliant leadership was the direct cause of the very heavy casualties inflicted on the enemy. In spite of his wound he refused to be evacuated and remained with his command, where his outstanding bravery and consistent determination had a marked effect in maintaining the splendid fighting spirit of those under him.

— Official VC citation, London Gazette, 30 January 1942.

== Further information ==
A memorial to Campbell stands in his old school, Sedbergh, commemorating his brave deeds.

There is a plaque and bench on a seaside walk in his home town in his honour. Major-General Campbell is also recorded on the War memorial in the village of Flore, 7 miles West of Northampton.

== Bibliography ==
- Buzzell, Nora (1997). The Register of the Victoria Cross. Cheltenham: This England. ISBN 0-906324-27-0.
- "Letters to the Daily Telegraph". London. 12 June 2007.
- Harvey, David (1999). Monuments to courage : victoria cross headstones and memorials. Vol.2, 1917–1982. K & K Patience. OCLC 59437300.
- Laffin, John (1997). British VCs of World War 2: a study in heroism. Stroud, Gloucs.: Sutton. ISBN 978-0-7509-1026-2.
- Mead, Richard (2007). Churchill's Lions: A biographical guide to the key British generals of World War II. Stroud (UK): Spellmount. p. 544 pages. ISBN 978-1-86227-431-0.
- Omand, Donald (1989). The New Caithness Book. Wick (UK): North of Scotland Newspapers Limited. p. 289 pages. ISBN 1-871704-00-6.
- Ross, Graham (1995). Scotland's Forgotten Valour. Isle of Skye: MacLean. ISBN 1-899272-00-3.
- Smart, Nick (2005). Biographical Dictionary of British Generals of the Second World War. Barnesley: Pen & Sword. ISBN 1844150496.
- "The Times – Obituary for Major Roy Farran". London. 6 June 2006. Archived from the original on 31 May 2010.

Military offices
Preceded by William Gott	GOC 7th Armoured Division; February 1942	Succeeded by Frank Messervy
