= British First Army order of battle, 4 May 1943 =

This is an outline order of battle of the British First Army on 4 May 1943 for Operation Strike during the Tunisian Campaign of World War II.

- British First Army
  Commanded by: Lieutenant-General Sir Kenneth Anderson
  - V Corps
    Commanded by Lieutenant-General Charles Allfrey
    - North Irish Horse
    - 7th Algerian Tirailleurs Regiment (7ème Régiment de Tirailleurs Algériens)
    - 1st Army Group Royal Artillery
    - 46th Infantry Division (less 139th Brigade Group)
    - 78th Infantry Division
  - IX Corps
    Commanded by: Lieutenant-General Brian Horrocks
    - 25th Tank Brigade (less two battalions)
    - 201st Guards Brigade
    - 2nd Army Group Royal Artillery
    - 4th Infantry Division
    - 4th Indian Infantry Division
    - 6th Armoured Division
    - 7th Armoured Division
  - XIX French Corps
    Commanded by General Louis Koeltz
    - One Tank Battalion
    - Division d'Alger
    - Division du Maroc
    - Division d'Oran
  - U.S. II Corps (co-ordinated by First Army but under direct control of 18th Army Group)
    Commanded by: Major General Omar Bradley
    - Corps Francs d'Afrique (three battalions)
    - One Tabor Moroccan Goumiers
    - U.S. 13th Field Artillery Brigade
    - U.S. 2626th Coast Artillery Brigade
    - 1st Armored Division (less one regiment)
    - 1st Infantry Division
    - 9th Infantry Division
    - 34th Infantry Division
  - Army Reserve
    - 1st King's Dragoon Guards
    - 51st (Leeds Rifles) Royal Tank Regiment
    - 139th Infantry Brigade
    - 1st Armoured Division

== See also ==
- List of orders of battle
- British First Army order of battle, 20 April 1943
