= British First Army order of battle, 20 April 1943 =

First Army: Tunisia 1943

This is the British First Army order of battle on 20 April 1943 during Operation Vulcan of the Tunisia Campaign of World War II.

- British First Army
  Commanded by: Lieutenant-General Kenneth Anderson
  - V Corps
    Commanded by Lieutenant-General Charles Allfrey
    - British 25th Tank Brigade (less 51st (Leeds Rifles) Royal Tank Regiment)
    - British 1st Infantry Division (Major-General Walter Clutterbuck)
    - British 4th Infantry Division (Major-General John Hawkesworth)
    - British 78th Infantry Division (Major-General Vyvyan Evelegh)
  - British IX Corps
    Commanded by: Lieutenant-General John Crocker
    - 51st (Leeds Rifles) Royal Tank Regiment
    - British 1st Armoured Division (Major-General Raymond Briggs)
    - British 6th Armoured Division (Major-General Charles Keightley)
    - British 46th Infantry Division (Major-General Harold Freeman-Attwood)
  - French XIX Corps
    Commanded by: Lieutenant General Louis Koeltz
    - Brigade Légère Mécanique (Tank Group)
    - 1st King's Dragoon Guards
    - Division d'Alger (Major General Pierre-Félix Conne)
    - Division du Maroc (Lieutenant General Maurice Mathenet)
    - Division d'Oran (Major-General Robert Boissau)
  - U.S. II Corps (co-ordinated by First Army but under direct control of 18th Army Group)
    Commanded by: Major General Omar Bradley
    - Corps Francs d'Afrique (three battalions)
    - 4th and 6th Tabors of Moroccan goumiers
    - U.S. 1st Armored Division (less one regiment) (Major General Ernest N. Harmon)
    - U.S. 1st Infantry Division (Major General Terry de la M. Allen)
    - U.S. 9th Infantry Division (Major General Manton S. Eddy)
    - U.S. 34th Infantry Division (Major General Charles W. Ryder)

== See also ==
- List of orders of battle
- British First Army order of battle, 4 May 1943
