= North African campaign =

Major military campaign of WWII fought in North Africa

- Part of the Mediterranean and Middle East theatre of World War II
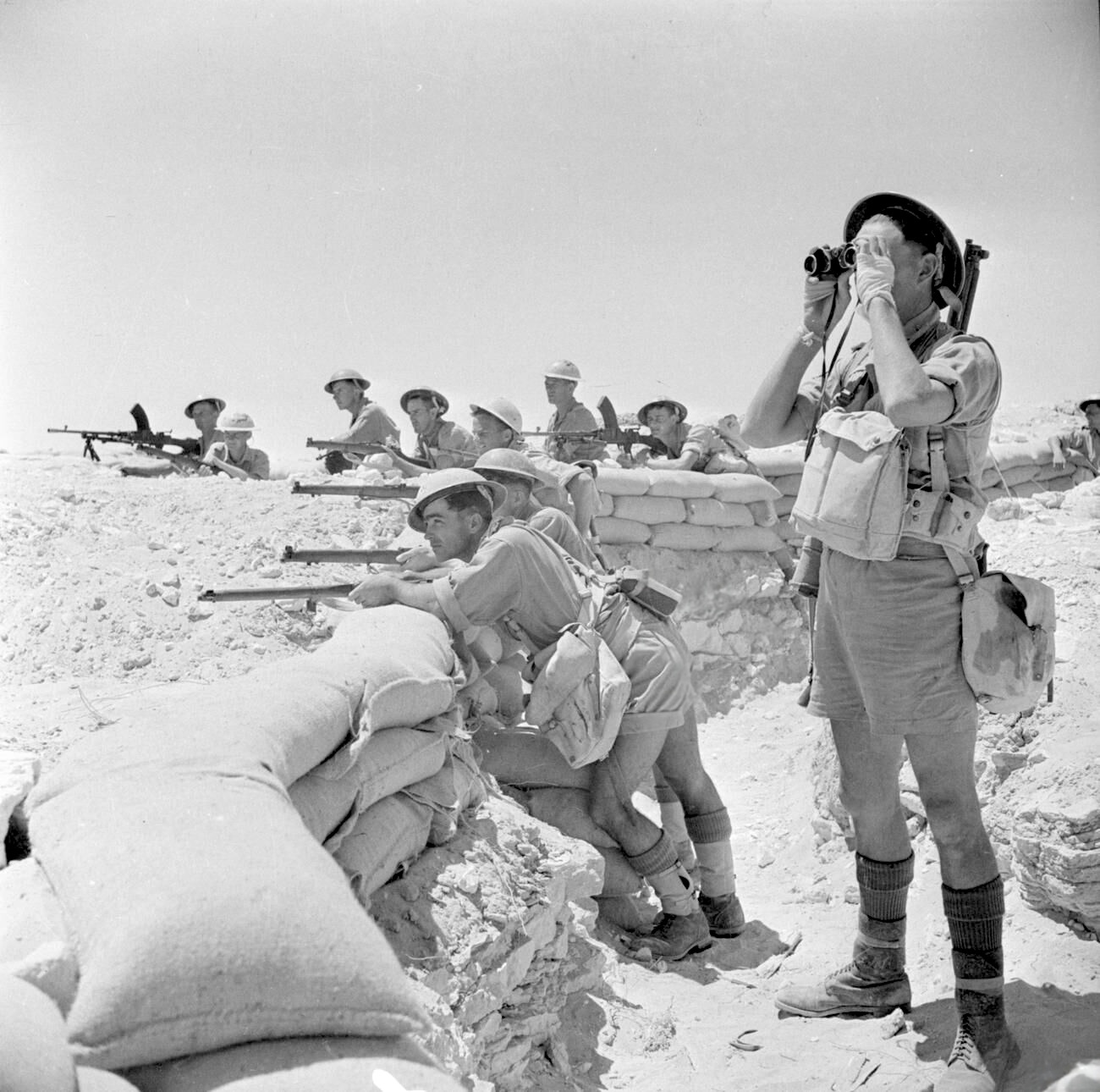
- British troops on the defensive posture during the First Battle of El Alamein, July 1942.
Date	11 June 1940 – 13 May 1943 (2 years, 11 months and 2 days)
Location	Libya, Egypt, Chad, Algeria, Morocco, Tunisia
Result	Allied victory
Territorial changes	Italian Libya placed under British and French military administration

Belligerents
Allies; United Kingdom and Empire: India; Emirate of Transjordan; Palestine; Newfoundland; United States (Note: November 1942 to May 1943.); Free France: Algeria; Tunisia; Morocco; Australia; New Zealand; South Africa; Poland; Greece; Czechoslovakia (Kingdom of Yugoslavia) Yugoslavia (Note: The Royal Yugoslav Army Outside the Homeland consisted of over 1,000 officers and soldiers of the Royal Yugoslav Army, Air Force, and Navy who escaped the Axis Invasion of Yugoslavia in April 1941 and subsequently participated in the Western Desert Campaign. This was the only part of the Royal Yugoslav Army that remained under the direct command of the Yugoslav government-in-exile in Cairo.)	Axis; Italy: Libya; Germany Vichy France (Note: 8–11 November 1942. Vichy officially pursued a policy of armed neutrality and conducted military actions against armed incursions from Axis and Allied belligerents. The pledging of allegiance of the Vichy troops in French North Africa to the Allies convinced the Axis that Vichy could not be trusted to continue this policy, so they invaded and occupied the French rump state (Case Anton)): Algeria; Tunisia; Morocco

Commanders and leaders
(United Kingdom) Archibald Wavell; (United Kingdom) Claude Auchinleck; (United Kingdom) Harold Alexander; (United Kingdom) Alan Cunningham; (United Kingdom) Neil Ritchie; (United Kingdom) Bernard Montgomery; (United Kingdom) Kenneth Anderson; (United States) Dwight D. Eisenhower; (Free France) Henri Giraud	(Kingdom of Italy) Ugo Cavallero; (Kingdom of Italy) Vittorio Ambrosio; (Kingdom of Italy) Italo Balbo †; (Kingdom of Italy) Rodolfo Graziani; (Kingdom of Italy) Italo Gariboldi; (Kingdom of Italy) Ettore Bastico; (Kingdom of Italy) Curio Barbasetti; (Kingdom of Italy) Giovanni Messe (surrendered); (Nazi Germany) Albert Kesselring; (Nazi Germany) Erwin Rommel; (Nazi Germany) Georg Stumme †; (Nazi Germany) Hans-Jürgen von Arnim (surrendered); (Vichy France) François Darlan (surrendered) (Note: Darlan joined the Allies after Operation Torch in Nov. 1942 but was later assassinated due to his former allegiance to Vichy France.)

Casualties and losses
British Empire: 35,478 killed 220,000 total casualties; Free France: 16,000 killed, wounded or missing; United States: 2,715 killed 8,978 wounded 6,528 missing; Material losses: 2,000 tanks destroyed 1,400 aircraft destroyed	(Kingdom of Italy) Italy: 22,341 killed 250,000–350,000 captured (Note: 500,000 prisoners are listed as being taken in North Africa, East Africa, and Sicily; as 150,000 POWs were taken in the Allied invasion of Sicily and about 100,000 in East Africa, this would leave ~250,000 to be taken in North Africa; 130,000 during Operation Compass, and 120,000 afterwards.) (Note: Historian Giorgio Rochat wrote: Sono circa 400.000 i prigionieri fatti dagli inglesi in Etiopia e in Africa settentrionale, 125.000 presi dagli americani in Tunisia e in Sicilia, 40.000 lasciati ai francesi in Tunisia ("There were about 400,000 prisoners taken by the British in North Africa and in Ethiopia, 125,000 taken by the Americans in Tunisia and Sicily, 40,000 by the French in Tunisia") Considering that about 100,000 Italian prisoners were taken in East Africa and that prisoners taken by the Americans were mainly in Sicily, the total is around 340,000–350,000.); (Nazi Germany) Germany: 18,594 killed 3,400 missing 180,000 captured; Vichy France: (Note: During Operation Torch only (8–16 November 1942).) 1,346 killed 1,997 wounded; Material losses: 2,550 tanks lost 70,000 trucks lost 6,200 guns lost 8,000 aircraft destroyed 2,400,000 gross tons of shipping

The North African campaign of World War II took place in North Africa from 11 June 1940 to 13 May 1943, fought between the Allies and the Axis powers. It included campaigns in the Libyan and Egyptian deserts (Western Desert campaign, Desert War), in Morocco and Algeria (Operation Torch), and in Tunisia (Tunisia campaign). The Allied war effort was dominated by the British Commonwealth and exiles from German-occupied Europe. The United States entered the war in December 1941 and began direct military assistance in North Africa on 11 May 1942.

Fighting in North Africa started with Italy's declaration of war to the United Kingdom and subsequent invasion of Egypt on 10 June 1940. On 14 June, the British 11th Hussars and part of the 1st Royal Tank Regiment (1st RTR) crossed the border from Egypt into Libya and captured Fort Capuzzo. This was followed by an Italian counter-offensive into Egypt and the capture of Sidi Barrani in September. The British recaptured Sidi Barrani in December during Operation Compass. The Italian 10th Army was destroyed and the German Afrika Korps was dispatched to North Africa in February 1941 in Operation Sonnenblume to reinforce the Italians and prevent an Axis defeat.

Battles for control of Libya and Egypt followed, with advances and retreats until the Second Battle of El Alamein in October 1942 when the Eighth Army (Lieutenant-General Bernard Montgomery) defeated the German–Italian Panzerarmee Afrika and forced its remnants into Tunisia. After Operation Torch, the Anglo-American landings in North-West Africa in November 1942 and fighting against Vichy France forces (which then changed sides), the Allies trapped about 250,000 German and Italian personnel in northern Tunisia, forcing their surrender in May 1943.

Information gleaned via British Ultra code-breaking was important in the Allied victory in North Africa. The Italian campaign followed, culminating in the downfall of the Fascist government in Italy and the elimination of Germany's main European ally. German and Italian forces committed atrocities against prisoners of war and Maghrebi Jews, Berbers and Arabs.

== Western Desert campaign ==
On 10 May 1940, the Wehrmacht started the Battle of France (or Westfeldzug). Six weeks later, France surrendered. The Armistice at Compiègne took place on 22 June 1940 leaving the Vichy government in control of French territory not occupied by Germany. This included all of French North Africa. On 10 June, Italy aligned itself with Nazi Germany and declared war upon France and the United Kingdom. Italian leader Benito Mussolini explicitly outlined in his declaration of war that this did not involve the war against Kingdom of Egypt, saying "Italy does not intend to drag into the conflict other peoples bordering her on land or on sea". British forces (along with Indian, Rhodesian and other commonwealth troops) based in Egypt were initially ordered to take defensive measures, but to avoid provocation as much as possible. However, on 11 June the British started launching a series of raids against Italian's assembly positions in Libya. Following the defeat of France on 25 June, Italian forces in Tripolitania – facing French troops based in Tunisia – redeployed to Cyrenaica to reinforce the Italian Tenth Army. This, coupled with the steadily degrading equipment of the British forces, led General Archibald Wavell to order an end to the raids and place the defence of the Egyptian border with a small screening force.

By 8 August, Mussolini ordered the Tenth Army to invade Egypt. Two days later, no invasion having been launched, Mussolini ordered Marshal Graziani that, the moment German forces launched Operation Sea Lion to invade Great Britain, he was to attack. After German defeat in the Battle of Britain, the invasion never took place. On 8 September, the Italians – despite being hampered by a lack of transport, low levels of training among officers, and the state of its supporting equipment – were ordered to invade Egypt the following day. The plan was to advance along the coastal road while limited armoured forces operated on the desert flank. To counter the Italian advance, Wavell ordered his screening forces to harass the Italians and then fall back towards Mersa Matruh, where the main British infantry force was based. Positioned on the desert flank was the 7th Armoured Division, which would strike at the flank of the Italian force.

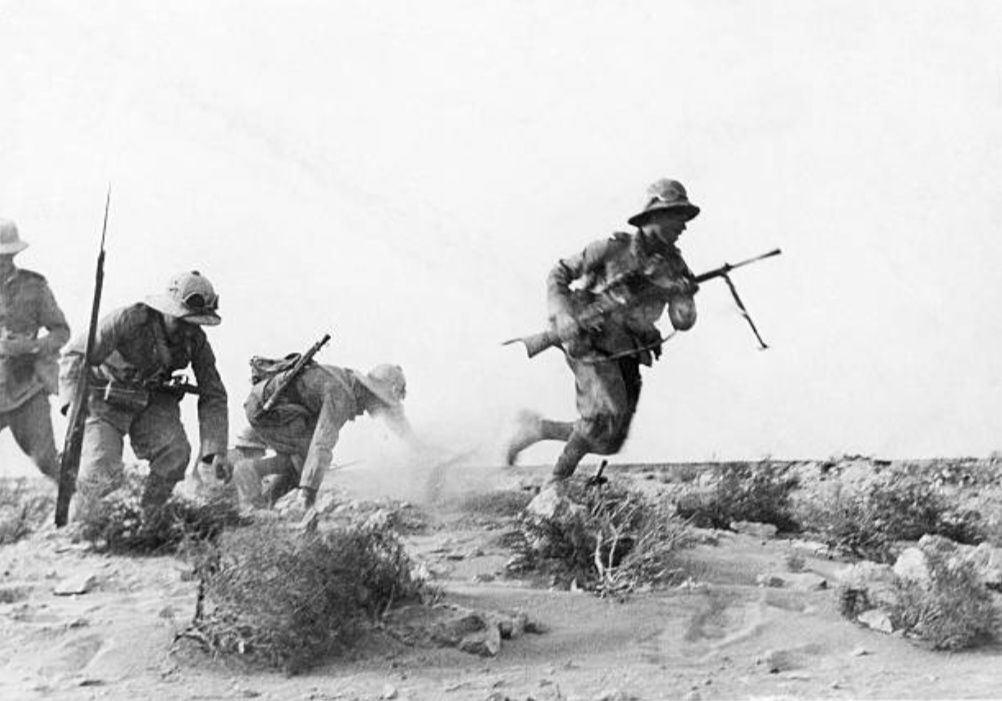
Italian troops charging in the desert

By 16 September, the Italian force had advanced to Maktila, around 130 kilometres (80 mi) west of Mersa Matruh, where they halted due to supply problems. Despite Mussolini urging them to carry on, Graziani ordered his men to dig in around Sidi Barrani, and fortified camps were established in forward locations; additional troops were also positioned behind the main force. In response to the dispersed Italian camps, the British planned a limited five-day attack, Operation Compass, to strike at these fortified camps one by one. The British Commonwealth force, totalling 36,000 men, attacked the forward elements of the 10-division-strong Italian army on 9 December. Following their initial success, the forces of Operation Compass pursued the retreating Italian forces. In January, the small port at Bardia was taken, soon followed by the seizure of the fortified port of Tobruk.

Some 40,000 Italians were captured in and around the two ports, with the remainder of the Tenth Army retreating along the coast road back to El Agheila. Richard O'Connor sent the 7th Armoured Division across the desert with a small reconnaissance group. It reached Beda Fomm some ninety minutes before the Italians, cutting off their retreat. Although they tried desperately to overcome the British force at the Battle of Beda Fomm, the Italians were unable to break through, and the remnants of the retreating army surrendered. Over ten weeks Allied forces had destroyed the Italian Tenth Army and reached El Agheila, taking 130,000 prisoners of war in the process.

Mussolini requested help from his German allies, while the Italian Comando Supremo ("high command") speedily sent several large motorized and armoured forces to protect their colonies in North Africa. This greatly expanded reinforcement included the soon-to-be-renowned Ariete Armoured division under General Ettore Baldassarre. Meanwhile, the Germans hastily assembled a motorized force, whose lead elements arrived in Tripoli in February. This relatively small expeditionary force, termed the Afrika Korps by Adolf Hitler, was placed under the command of Erwin Rommel. His orders were to reinforce the Italians and block Allied attempts to drive them out of the region. However, the initial commitment of only one panzer division and subsequently, no more than two panzer and one motorized divisions, indicated the limited extent of German involvement and commitment to this theatre of operations. The bulk of the reinforcements were Italian and therefore it was up to the Italians to do the bulk of the fighting. The forward Allied force – now named XIII Corps – adopted a defensive posture and over the coming months was built up, before most of its veteran forces were redeployed to Greece to counter the German invasion there. In addition, the 7th Armoured Division was withdrawn to the Nile delta. The veteran forces were replaced by inexperienced newcomers, ill-equipped to face German armour.

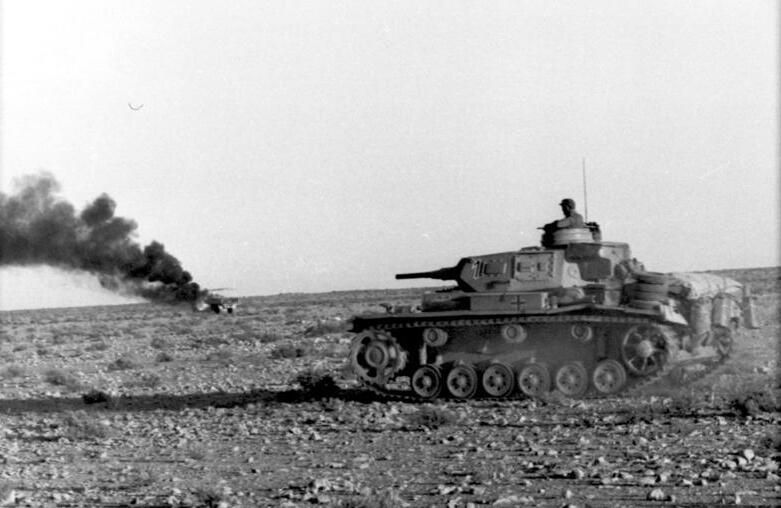
German Panzer III during Operation Sonnenblume, April 1941

Although Rommel had been ordered to simply hold the line, an armoured reconnaissance soon became a full-fledged offensive from El Agheila in March. In March–April, Allied forces were forced back and leading general officers captured. The Australian 9th Infantry Division fell back to the fortress port of Tobruk, and the remaining British and Commonwealth forces withdrew a further 160 kilometres (100 mi) east to the Libyan–Egyptian border. With Tobruk under siege by the main Italian-German force, a small battlegroup continued to press eastwards. Capturing Fort Capuzzo and Bardia in passing, it then advanced into Egypt, and by the end of April it had taken Sollum and the tactically important Halfaya Pass. Rommel garrisoned these positions, reinforcing the battle-group and ordering it onto the defensive.

Though isolated on land, Tobruk's garrison continued to receive supplies and replacements, delivered by the Royal Navy at night. German and Italian forces did not have the strength or training to take the fortress. This created a supply problem for his forward units. His front-line positions at Sollum were at the end of an extended supply chain that stretched back to Tripoli and had to bypass the coast road at Tobruk. Further, he was constantly threatened with a breakout of the British forces at Tobruk. Without Tobruk in Axis hands, further advances into Egypt were impractical.

The Allies launched a small-scale counter-attack called Operation Brevity in an attempt to push Axis forces off the key passes at the border, with some initial success. However they could not hold the advance positions and followed Brevity up with a much larger-scale offensive, Operation Battleaxe intended to relieve the siege at Tobruk, but this operation also failed. Following the failure of Operation Battleaxe, Archibald Wavell was relieved of command and replaced by Claude Auchinleck. The Western Desert Force was reinforced with a second corps, XXX Corps, with the two corps forming the Eighth Army. Eighth Army was made up of army forces from the Commonwealth nations, including the British Army, the Australian Army, the Indian Army, the New Zealand Army, the South African Army, and the Sudan Defence Force. There was also a brigade of Free French under Marie-Pierre Koenig.

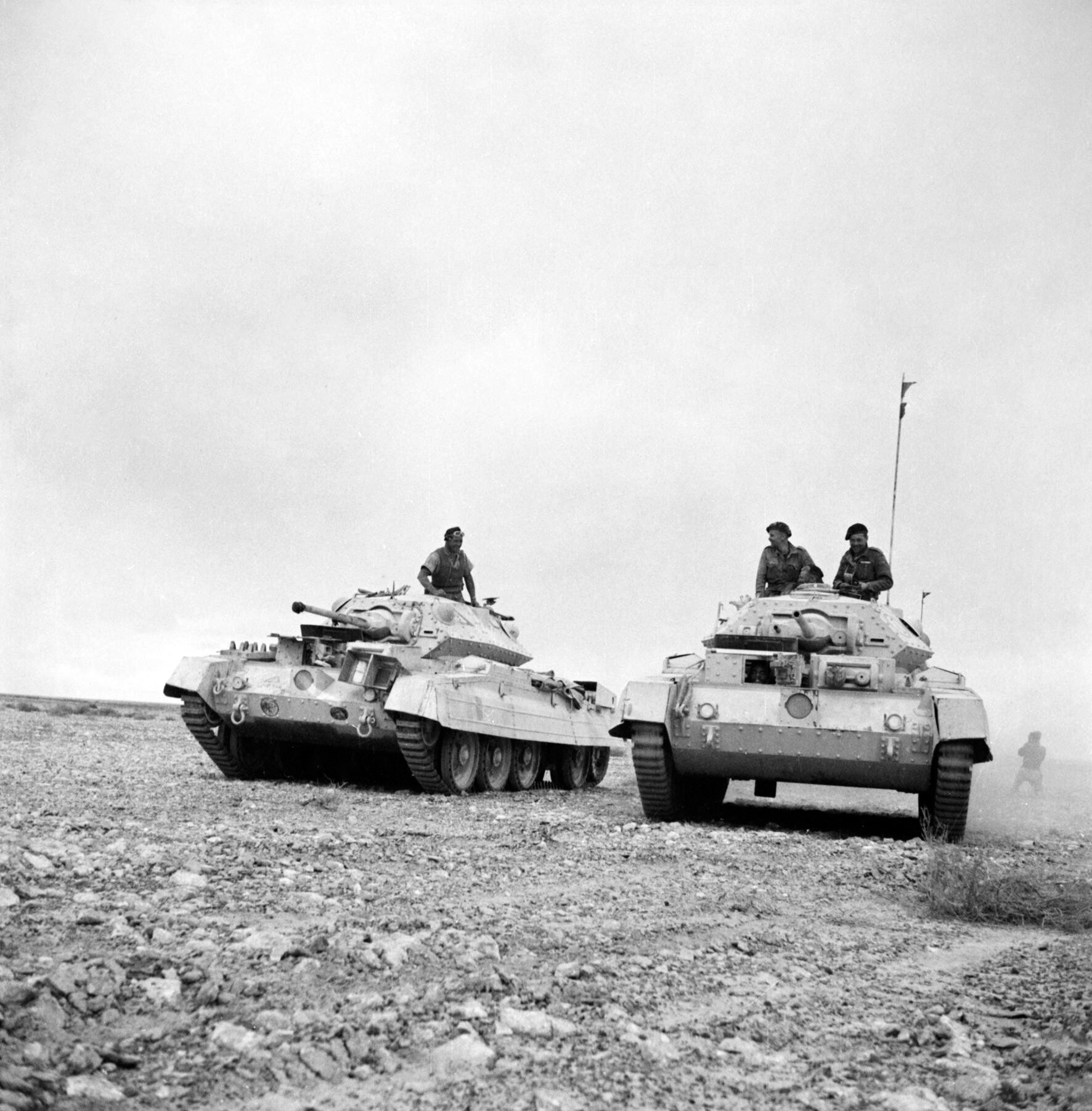
British Crusader tanks during the Operation Crusader, 26 November 1941

The new formation launched a new offensive, Operation Crusader, in November. After a see-saw battle, the 70th Division garrisoning Tobruk was relieved and the Axis forces were forced to fall back. By January 1942, the front line was again at El Agheila.

After receiving supplies and reinforcements from Tripoli, the Axis attacked again, defeating the Allies in the Battle of Gazala in June and capturing Tobruk. The Axis forces drove the Eighth Army back over the Egyptian border, but their advance was stopped in July only 90 miles (140 km) from Alexandria in the First Battle of El Alamein.

Of great significance, on 29 June reports of British military operations in North Africa sent to Washington by the US military attaché in Cairo, Bonner Fellers, no longer used the compromised "Black Code" which the Axis forces had been reading, so the Axis could no longer learn of British "strengths, positions, losses, reinforcements, supply, situation, plans, morale etc" as they had since 1940.

General Auchinleck, although he had checked Rommel's advance at the First Battle of El Alamein, was replaced by General Harold Alexander. Lieutenant-General William Gott was promoted from XIII Corps commander to command of the entire Eighth Army, but he was killed when his aircraft was intercepted and shot down over Egypt. He was replaced by Lieutenant-General Bernard Montgomery.

At the end of June, Axis forces made a second attempt to break through the Allied defences at El Alamein at Alam Halfa, but were unsuccessful. After a lengthy period of build-up and training, the Eighth Army launched a major offensive, decisively defeating the Italian-German army in the Second Battle of El Alamein in late October, driving Axis forces west and capturing Tripoli in mid-January 1943. By February, the Eighth Army was facing the Italian-German Panzer Army near the Mareth Line and came under command of Alexander's 18th Army Group for the concluding phase of the war in North Africa – the Tunisia campaign.

== Operation Torch ==
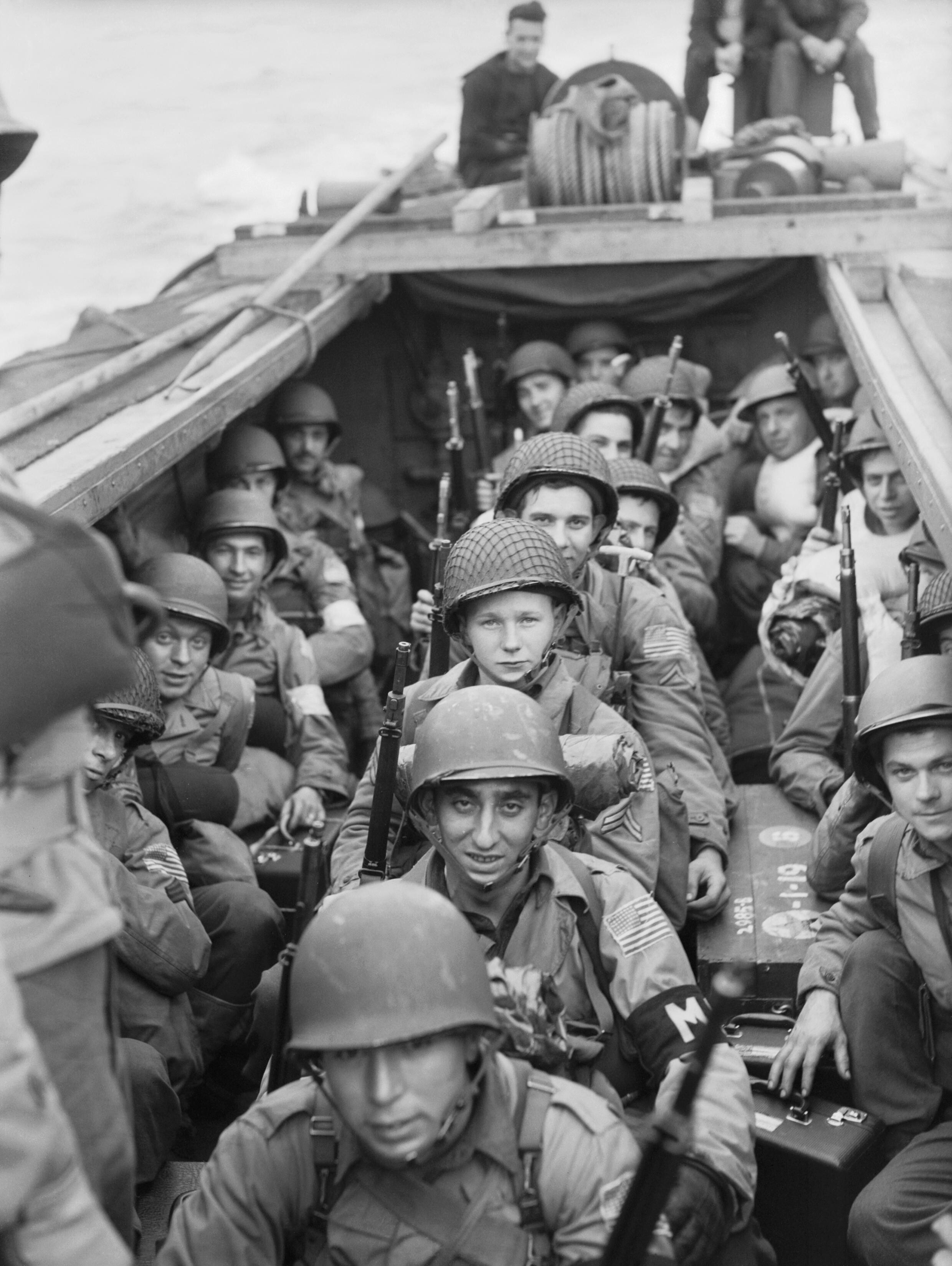
American troops on board a Landing Craft Assault heading into Oran, November 1942

Operation Torch in November 1942 was a compromise operation that met the British objective of securing victory in North Africa while allowing American armed forces the opportunity to engage in the fight against Nazi Germany on a limited scale. In addition, as Joseph Stalin, the leader of the Soviet Union, had long been pleading for a second front to be opened to engage the Wehrmacht and relieve pressure on the Red Army, it provided some degree of relief for the Red Army on the Eastern Front by diverting Axis forces to the North African theatre. Over half the German Ju 52 transport planes that were needed to supply the encircled Axis forces at Stalingrad were tied up supplying Axis forces in North Africa.

Senior U.S. commanders were strongly opposed to proposed landings in North-West Africa. After the western Allied Combined Chiefs of Staff (CCS) met in London on 30 July 1942 General George Marshall and Admiral Ernest King declined to approve the plan. Marshall and other U.S. generals advocated the invasion of northern Europe later that year, which the British rejected. After Prime Minister Winston Churchill pressed for a landing in French North Africa in 1942, Marshall suggested instead to President Franklin D. Roosevelt that the U.S. abandon the Germany first strategy and take the offensive in the Pacific. Roosevelt said it would do nothing to help Russia. With Marshall unable to persuade the British to change their minds, President Roosevelt gave a direct order that Operation Torch was to have precedence over other operations and was to take place at the earliest possible date, one of only two direct orders he gave to military commanders during the war.

The landings started on 8 November, and finished on 16 November. In an attempt to pincer German and Italian forces, Allied forces (American and British Commonwealth) landed in Vichy-held French North Africa under the assumption that there would be little to no resistance. Nevertheless, Vichy French forces put up a strong and bloody resistance to the Allies in Oran and Morocco, but not in Algiers, where a coup d'état by the French resistance on 8 November succeeded in neutralizing the French XIX Corps before the landing and arresting the Vichy commanders. Consequently, the landings met no practical opposition in Algiers, and the city was captured on the first day along with the entire Vichy African command. After three days of talks and threats, Generals Mark Clark and Dwight Eisenhower compelled Vichy Admiral François Darlan and General Alphonse Juin to order the cessation on 10–11 November of armed resistance from Vichy forces in Oran and Morocco, promising to make Darlan the head of a Free French administration. During Operation Torch, Americans fought Vichy French and German navy vessels in the Naval Battle of Casablanca, which ended in an American victory.

The Allied landings prompted the Axis occupation of Vichy France (Case Anton) including an attempt to capture the French fleet at Toulon, which did them little good, as the main portion of the fleet was scuttled to prevent their use by the Axis.

The Vichy Army in North Africa joined the Allies.

== Tunisian campaign ==
Following the Operation Torch landings – from early November 1942 – the Germans and Italians initiated a buildup of troops in Tunisia to fill the vacuum left by Vichy troops which had withdrawn. During this period of weakness, the Allies decided against a rapid advance into Tunisia while they wrestled with the Vichy authorities. Many of the Allied soldiers were tied up in garrison duties because of the uncertain status and intentions of the Vichy forces.

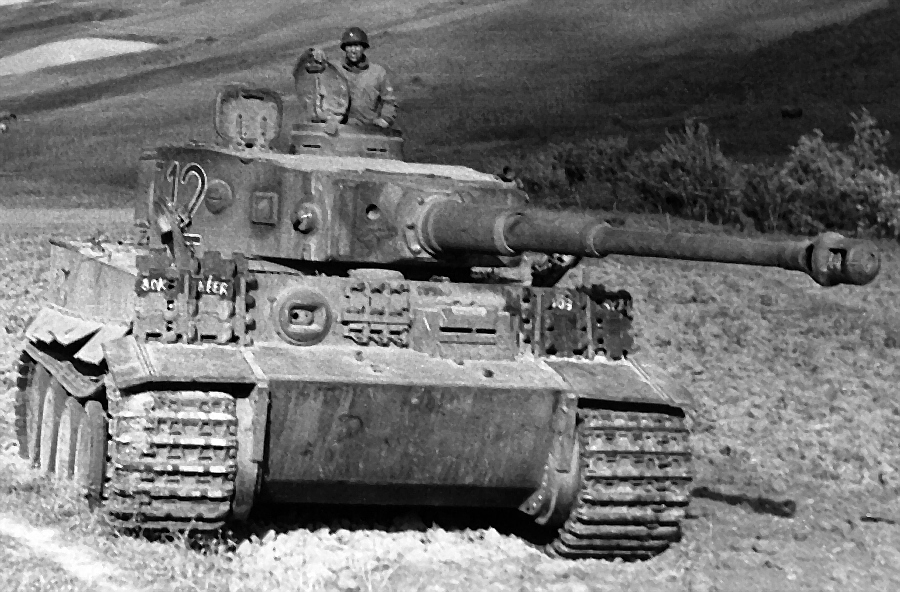
Captured Tiger I tank #712 of the 501st Heavy Panzer Battalion

By mid-November, the Allies were able to advance into Tunisia, but only in single division strength. By early December, the Eastern Task Force – which had been redesignated as the British First Army under Lieutenant-General Kenneth Anderson – was composed of the British 78th Infantry Division, British 6th Armoured Division, 1st Parachute Brigade, No. 6 Commando and elements of US 1st Armored Division. But by this time, one German and five Italian divisions had been shipped from Europe and the remoteness of Allied airfields from the front line gave the Axis clear air superiority over the battlefield. The Allies were halted and pushed back having advanced eastwards to within 30 kilometres (19 mi) of Tunis.

In early December, the Allies were met with the reality that they would not be successful in capturing the key cities of Tunis and Bizerta. The air campaigns by the Axis forces proved to be a difficult challenge for the British forces. However, the Allies were left with the advantage of having secured the island of Malta, enabling the Allies to carry out future aerial operations. Additionally, on land, allied British and American forces were able to hold onto their possessions. On 4 December 1942 the Allied Force Headquarters in North Africa reported that military operations were ongoing in the Tebourba area. The Axis powers attempted a second counter-attack in the neighborhood of Tebourba, following their failed attempt on 1 December. The attack was successfully repulsed by the Allied powers, and the enemy sustained significant damage to their weaponry. During the winter, there followed a period of stalemate during which time both sides continued to build up their forces. By the new year, the British First Army had one British, one US and one French Corps (a second British Corps headquarters was activated in April). In the second half of February, in eastern Tunisia, the Axis had some successes against the mainly inexperienced French and US troops, most notably in routing the US II Corps commanded by Major General Lloyd Fredendall at the Battle of Kasserine Pass.

By the beginning of March, the British Eighth Army – advancing westward along the North African coast – had reached the Tunisian border. Rommel and von Arnim found themselves in an Allied "two army" pincer. They were outflanked, outmanned and outgunned. Rommel went back to Germany for health reasons and was substituted by the Italian general Messe.

The British Eighth Army bypassed the Axis defence on the Mareth Line in late March after harsh fighting and First Army in central Tunisia launched their main offensive in mid-April to squeeze the Axis forces until their resistance in Africa collapsed. The Axis forces surrendered on 13 May 1943 yielding over 275,000 prisoners of war. The last Axis force to surrender in North Africa was the 1st Italian Army of General Messe. This huge loss of experienced troops greatly reduced the military capacity of the Axis powers, although some Axis troops escaped Tunisia. This defeat in Africa led to all Italian colonies in Africa being captured.

== Intelligence ==
=== Axis ===
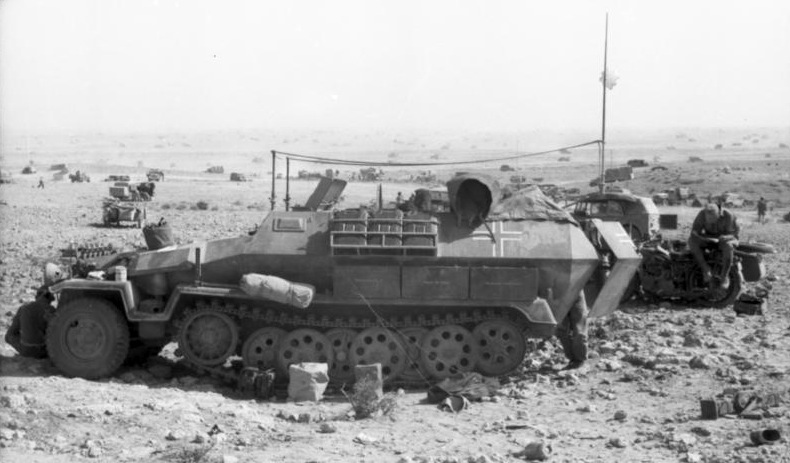
A German Signals reception unit in the desert

The Axis had considerable success in intelligence gathering through radio communication intercepts and monitoring unit radio traffic. The most important success came through intercepting the reports of Fellers, the US military attaché in Egypt. He had been tasked by Marshall with providing detailed reports on the military situation in Africa. Fellers talked with British military and civilian headquarters personnel, read documents and visited the battlefront. Known to the Germans as "die gute Quelle" (the good source) or more jokingly as 'the little fellow', he transmitted his reports back to Washington using the "Black Code" of the US State Department. However, in September 1941, the Italians had stolen a code book containing the Black Code, photographed it and returned it to the US embassy in Rome. The Italians shared parts of their intercepts with their German allies. In addition the "Chiffrierabteilung" (German military cipher branch) were soon able to break the code. Fellers' reports were very detailed and played a significant role in informing the Germans of allied strength and intentions between January and June 1942

In addition, the Italian Servizio Informazioni Segrete or SIS code-breakers were able to successfully intercept much radio encrypted signals intelligence (SIGINT) from British aircraft traffic as well as first-class ciphers from British vessels and land bases, providing Supermarina (Regia Marina) with timely warnings of Allied intentions in the Mediterranean. Indeed, so successful was the Italian SIS in handling the bulk of Axis naval intelligence in the Mediterranean, that "Britain's offensive use of SIGINT was largely negated by Italy's defensive SIGINT."

The Afrika Korps had the intelligence services of the 621st Signals Battalion mobile monitoring element which arrived in North Africa in late April 1941, commanded by Hauptmann Alfred Seeböhm. The 621st Signals Battalion monitored radio communications among British units. Unfortunately for the Allies, the British not only failed to change their codes with any frequency, they were also prone to poor radio discipline in combat. Their officers made frequent open, uncoded transmissions to their commands, allowing the Germans to more easily identify British units and deployments. The situation changed after a counterattack during the Battle of Gazala resulted in the 621st Signals Battalion being overrun and destroyed, and a number of their documents captured, alerting British intelligence to the problem. The British responded by instituting an improved call signal procedure, introducing radiotelephonic codes, imposing rigid wireless silence on reserve formations, padding out real messages with dummy traffic, tightening up on their radio discipline in combat and creating an entire fake signals network in the southern sector.

=== Allies ===
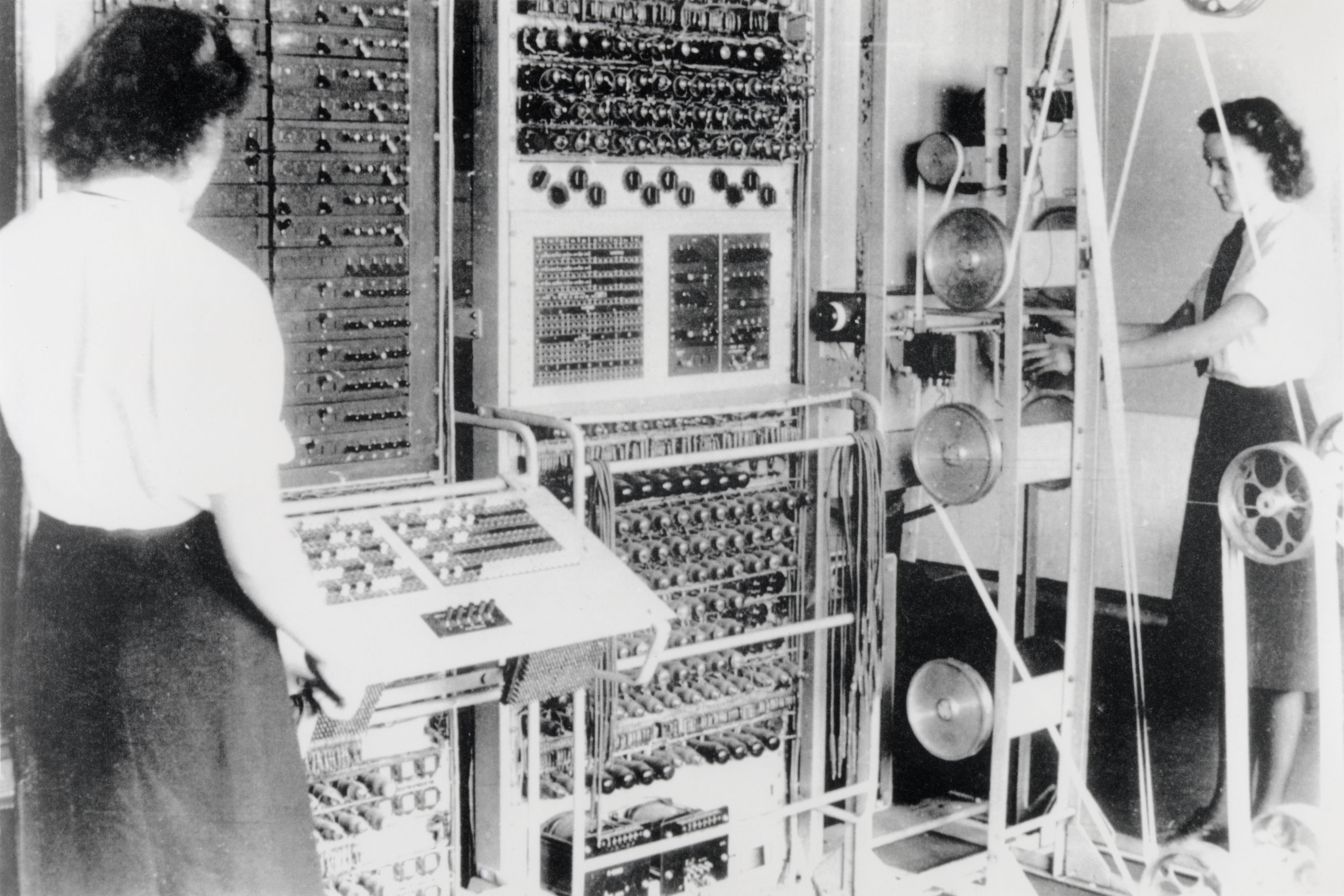
Colossus Mark II computer at Bletchley Park

Allied codebreakers read much enciphered German message traffic, especially that encrypted with the Enigma machine. The Allies' Ultra programme was initially of limited value, as it took too long to get the information to the commanders in the field, and at times provided information that was less than helpful. (Note: Quote: Protection of the top secret Ultra source meant that the distribution of Ultra was extremely slow and by the time it had reached the relevant commander it was often out of date and therefore at best useless and at worst dangerously mis-leading."Intelligence in North Africa" Archived 24 January 2013 at the Wayback Machine) In terms of anticipating the next move the Germans would make, reliance on Ultra sometimes backfired. Part of the reason the initial German attacks in March 1941 were so successful was that Ultra intercepts had informed Wavell that OKW had clearly directed Rommel not to take any offensive action, but to wait until he was further reinforced with the 15th Panzer Division in May. (Note: Quote: Schuld an dieser Einschätzung sind die Enigma Berichte, aus denen Wavell ersehen kann, dass Rommel lediglich den Auftrag hat, die Syrte-Front zu stabilisieren, und dass sein wichtigster Verband, die 15. Panzerdivision, noch nicht in Afrika eingetroffen ist.Verlauf März 1941 Archived 5 February 2013 at the Wayback Machine. In: Der Feldzug in Afrika 1941–1943 (deutsches-afrikakorps.de). Retrieved 24 November 2009. Translated: The responsibility for this assessment are the Enigma reports, which can be seen from Wavell that Rommel only has a mandate to stabilize the Sirte front, and that his most important unit, the 15th Panzer Division, has not yet arrived in Africa.) Rommel received this information, but placed more value on his own assessment of the situation. Trusting that the Germans had no intention of taking major action, the British command did not respond until it was too late. (Note: Quote: On 30 March Wavell signalled, 'I do not believe he can make any big effort for another month.') Furthermore, Rommel did not generally provide OKW or the Italian Comando Supremo details of his planned operations, for he thought the Italians too prone to leak the information. Thus on 21 January 1942, when Rommel struck out on his second offensive from El Agheila, Comando Supremo was just as surprised to learn of it as the British were. (Note: Quote from Rommel's diary: I had maintained secrecy over the Panzer Group's forthcoming attack eastwards from Mersa el Brega and informed neither the Italian nor the German High Command. We knew from experience that Italian Headquarters cannot keep things to themselves and that everything they wireless to Rome gets round to British ears. However, I had arranged with the Quartermaster for the Panzer Group's order to be posted in every Cantoniera in Tripolitinia on 21 January ...) Ultra intercepts provided the British with such information as the name of the new German commander, his time of arrival, and the numbers and condition of the Axis forces, but they might not correctly reveal Rommel's intentions.

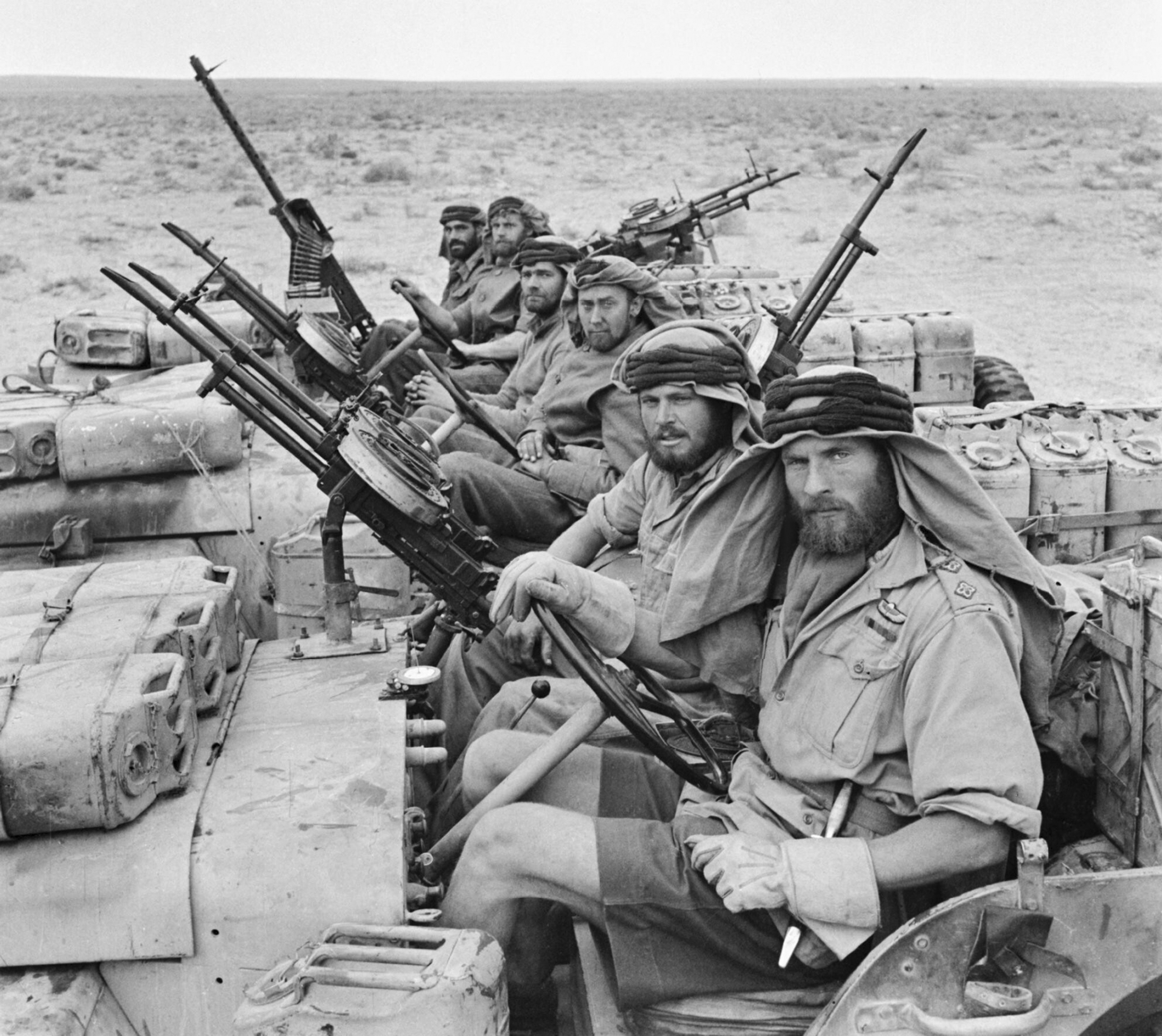
British SAS patrol in armed jeeps

The primary benefit of Ultra intercepts to the effort in North Africa was to aid in cutting the Axis supply line to Tunisia. Ultra intercepts provided valuable information about the times and routes of Axis supply shipments across the Mediterranean. This was critical in providing the British with the opportunity to intercept and destroy them. During the time when Malta was under heavy air attack, the ability to act on this information was limited, but as Allied air and naval strength improved, the information became instrumental to Allied success. It is estimated that 40% to 60% of Axis supply shipping was located and destroyed due to decrypted information. However, this claim is strongly disputed by the authors Vincent P. O'Hara and Enrico Cernuschi (2013) who claim that historians like F.H. Hinsley have greatly exaggerated the effects of Ultra. For example, they claim that intelligence provided by Ultra had little impact in stopping Italian convoys reaching North Africa. Of the 2.67 million tons of materiel, fuel, and munitions shipped to Africa – nearly all in Italian vessels and under Italian escort – 2.24 million tons managed to arrive despite the best efforts of Ultra and the British Navy to prevent it. In effect, "Ultra did not deny the Axis armies the supplies they needed to reach the Nile."

Heavy losses of German paratroopers during the Battle of Crete, made possible by Ultra warnings of the drop times and locations, meant that Hitler hesitated in attacking Malta, which aided the British in gaining control of the Mediterranean, as did the losses of the Italian Navy at the Battle of Cape Matapan. To conceal the fact that German coded messages were being read, a fact critical to the overall Allied war effort, British command required a flyover mission be carried out before a convoy could be attacked in order to give the appearance that a reconnaissance flight had discovered the target.

== Atrocities ==
The North African campaign was often labeled a "war without hate", a pure military clash in the desert without the partisan murders and ethnic cleansing that was occurring across Europe. This view has been challenged by recent historians, given that there were indeed many civilians who lived in the region and the campaign was marked by numerous atrocities and abuses by both Italian and German forces towards Allied prisoners of war and local Jewish, Berber, and Arab populations.

== Aftermath ==
After victory by the Allies in the North African campaign, the stage was set for the Italian campaign to begin. The invasion of Sicily followed two months later, on 9 July 1943.

=== Casualties ===
During the entire North African campaign, the Axis suffered 620,000 casualties, while the British Commonwealth lost 220,000 of its men. US forces casualties in Tunisia alone exceeded more than 18,500.

Among the Commonwealth forces, South Africa and New Zealand suffered substantial losses. 23,625 South African casualties were recorded during the North Africa campaign, representing 7% of all South African military personnel served during the World War 2. These included 2,104 killed in action, more than 7,000 wounded 14,242 taken prisoner of whom 10,722 were captured following the fall of Tobruk in June 1942. New Zealand forces suffered 2,989 deaths, more than 7,000 wounded and 4,041 taken prisoner during the campaign.

In the Tunisian campaign, US forces sustained 13,984 battle casualties, including 2,390 killed, 8,577 wounded and 3,017 missing. British and Commonwealth forces sustained 35,940 casualties, while French forces suffered 16,180. The Polish Independent Carpathian Rifle Brigade, commanded by Stanisław Kopański, also suffered losses during its operations in North Africa between August 1941 and March 1942. The brigade sustained 156 killed (127 in Tobruk), 467 wounded and 15 missing. It participated in the siege of Tobruk and the fighting around Gazala in December 1941, during which it captured 2000 Axis (mainly Italian) prisoners.

== See also ==
- List of British military equipment of World War II
- List of equipment of the United States Army during World War II
- List of French military equipment of World War II
- List of German military equipment of World War II
- List of Italian Army equipment in World War II
- List of North African campaign battles
- Military history of Italy during World War II
- North African campaign timeline
- Timelines of World War II by year: 1940 / 1941 / 1942 / 1943
- Libya in World War II
- The Campaign for North Africa, 1978 board game notorious for its length
