= Allied Force Headquarters =

Mediterranean headquarters 1942–1945

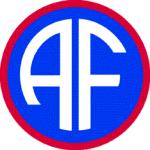
- Active: 14 August 1942—17 September 1947
- Countries: United States; United Kingdom
- Type: General Headquarters
- Garrison/HQ: London, United Kingdom; Gibraltar AFHQ FWD; Algiers AFHQ FWD
- Engagements: World War II; Operation Torch; Operation Husky; Operation Baytown; Operation Avalanche

Commanders
- Notable commanders: General Dwight D. Eisenhower; General Henry Maitland Wilson; General Harold Alexander; Lieutenant General William Duthie Morgan; Lieutenant General John C. H. Lee

Allied Force Headquarters (AFHQ) was the headquarters that controlled all Allied operational forces in the Mediterranean theatre of World War II from August 1942 until the end of the war in Europe in May 1945.

== History ==
AFHQ was established in the United Kingdom on 14 August 1942 under Lieutenant General Dwight D. Eisenhower in order to command the forces committed to Operation Torch, the Allied invasion of French North Africa, set for November. Eisenhower had the title Commander-in-Chief, Allied Expeditionary Force. Shortly after the establishment of the headquarters, "Expeditionary" was deleted from its title, for reasons of operational security. Eisenhower thus became Commander-in-Chief, Allied Force. The HQ was moved to Gibraltar on 5 November 1942, and then on to Algiers on 28 November 1942.

Towards the end of 1942, there was a need to unify command of the Allied forces in North Africa, since those from the west, the British First Army, under the command of Lieutenant-General Kenneth Anderson, landed during Operation Torch, and those from the east, the British Eighth Army, commanded by Lieutenant-General Bernard Montgomery, that had fought and won the Second Battle of El Alamein, were now close enough together to need coordination. Therefore, on 10 February 1943, AFHQ assumed control of the Eighth Army advancing from the east as well.

In March 1943 AFHQ supervised Mediterranean Air Command (later replaced by the Mediterranean Allied Air Forces); 18th Army Group; the Royal Navy Commander-in-Chief, of the Mediterranean Fleet, acting as the Allied naval commander, and the Fifth United States Army.

Eisenhower remained in command of AFHQ until 16 January 1944, overseeing the Allied invasion of Sicily (with the codename of Operation Husky) which began on 10 July 1943, and the Allied invasion of the Italian mainland (Operation Baytown and Operation Avalanche) on 3 September 1943. Eisenhower, then a full general, returned to the United Kingdom on 14 January 1944 to assume command 2 days later of the Allied forces assembling for Operation Overlord, the Allied invasion of Normandy, scheduled for the spring of 1944. He was succeeded by General Sir Henry Maitland Wilson. Wilson's title became Supreme Commander, Mediterranean theater of operations.

Wilson was in command for just under a year, until he was sent to Washington, D.C., in December 1944 to replace Field Marshal Sir John Dill of the British Joint Staff Mission who had died suddenly. Wilson was succeeded by Field Marshal Sir Harold Alexander who was Supreme Commander and commander of AFHQ until the end of the war. After the war AFHQ became a small inter-allied staff responsible for combined command liquidation activities and commanded by Lieutenant-General Sir William Duthie Morgan as Supreme Allied Commander Mediterranean. Morgan retired to Britain dated 31 December 1946 and was replaced by his Deputy, U.S. Lieutenant General John C. H. Lee until AFHQ was abolished, effective 17 September 1947, by General Order 24, AFHQ, on 16 September 1947.

== Commanders ==
- General Dwight D. Eisenhower - 14 August 1942 to 7 January 1944
- General Henry Maitland Wilson - 8 January 1944 to December 1944
- General Harold Alexander - December 1944 to May 1945
- Lieutenant General William Duthie Morgan - May 1945 to 31 December 1946
- Lieutenant General John C. H. Lee 31 December 1946 to 17 September 1947

== See also ==
- Mediterranean Theater of Operations, United States Army (MTO) was originally called the North African Theater of Operations (NATO) and was the United States Army organisation fighting the Axis powers in North Africa and Italy during World War II.
