= List of North African campaign battles =

The North African campaign of World War II, sometimes called the "Desert War", includes the campaigns in Egypt and Libya (often referred to as the Western Desert campaign or the "Egypt–Libya Campaign") and those campaigns in Morocco, Algeria and Tunisia (usually referred to as the Tunisian campaign. This is not a comprehensive list of all engagements and generally does not cover isolated skirmishes of units smaller than a company in size.

This is part of the more comprehensive list of World War II battles.

== 1940 ==
- June 14–16: First Battle of Fort Capuzzo
- June 17: Battle of Girba
- September: Second Battle of Fort Capuzzo
- September 9–16: Italian invasion of Egypt
- December 9 – February 9, 1941: Operation Compass
  - December 8: Battle of the Camps
  - December 9: Battle of Nibeiwa
  - December 10: Third Battle of Fort Capuzzo
  - December 20–21 March 1941: Siege of Giarabub

== 1941 ==
- Operation Compass continued
  - January 3–5: First Battle of Bardia
  - January 9–26: First Battle of Tobruk
  - January 25: First Battle of Mechili
  - January 24–26: Battle of Derna
  - February 5: Fall of Benghazi
  - February 5–7: Battle of Beda Fomm
- Operation Sunflower
  - March 21–23: Battle of the Oasis
  - March 24: First Battle of El Agheila
  - April 6–8: Second Battle of Mechili
  - April 10 – November 27: Siege of Tobruk
  - April 12: Second Battle of Bardia
  - April 12: First Battle of Sollum
  - April 12: Fourth Battle of Fort Capuzzo
  - April 30: First Battle of Halfaya Pass
- Operation Brevity
  - May 15: Second Battle of Halfaya Pass
  - May 15–16: Fifth Battle of Fort Capuzzo
- Operation Skorpion
  - May 27: Third Battle of Halfaya Pass
- Operation Battleaxe
  - June 15–17: Fourth Battle of Halfaya Pass
  - June 15: Battle for Point 206
  - June 15–16: Battle for Hafid Ridge
  - June 15–16: Sixth Battle of Fort Capuzzo
  - June 16: Battle of Sidi Omar
  - June 17: Battle of Sidi Suleiman
- Operation Crusader
  - November 19: First Action at Bir el Gubi
  - November 19 - December 1: Battle of Sidi Rezegh
  - November 21 – December 7: Second Battle of Tobruk
  - November 21: Battle of Bir el Haiad
  - November 22: Battle of Bir Ghirba
  - November 22: Second Battle of Sidi Omar
  - November 27: Battle of Bir el Chleta
  - November 29 - December 4: Battle of Ed Dedu
  - November 29 - December 1: Battle of Belhamed
  - December 1: Battle of Zaafran
  - December 2: Battle of Belhamed Road
  - December 3–7: Second Action at Bir el Gubi
  - December 11–27: First Battle of Cyrenaica Line
    - December 13: Battle of Alem Hamza
    - December 13–14: Battle of Point 204
  - December 23: Battle of Antelat
  - December 23: Second Battle of Beda Fomm

== 1942 ==
- Operation Crusader continued
  - January 2: Battle of Bardia
  - January 12: Third Battle of Sollum
- Operation Theseus
  - January 21: Second Battle of El Agheila
  - January 23: Second Battle of Cyrenaica Line
  - January 28: Second Battle of Benghazi
  - Battle of Gazala
    - May 27: Battle of Retma Box
    - Battle of the Cauldron
      - May 27 – June 12: Battle of El Adem
      - May 28 – June 10: Battle of Bir Hakeim
      - May 31: Battle of the 150th Brigade Box
      - June 13: Battle of Knightsbridge
    - June 15: Battle of Point 650
    - June 20: Fall of Tobruk
- Operation Aida
  - June 26–28: Battle of Mersa Matruh
  - June 28: Battle of Fuka
  - June 30: Battle of the El Alamein Box
  - July 1-27: First Battle of El Alamein
    - July 1–2: First Battle of the Coast Road
    - July 1: Battle of Deir el Shein
    - July 2: First Battle of Ruweisat Ridge
    - July 3–5: Battle of the Qattara box (Also known as Battle of the Kaponga box)
    - July 10: First Battle of Tel el Eisa
    - July 14: Second Battle of Ruweisat Ridge
    - July 14: Second Battle of Tel el Eisa
    - July 22: Third Battle of Ruweisat Ridge
    - July 27: Third Battle of Tel el Eisa
    - July 27: Battle of Miteiriya Ridge
- August 30 – September 2: Battle of Alam el Halfa
- September 2: Battle of Himeimat
- Second Battle of El Alamein
  - October 23–28: Operation Lightfoot
    - October 23–25: Battle of the Oxalic Line
    - October 23: Fourth Battle of Ruweisat Ridge
    - October 24–26: Battle of Kidney Ridge
    - October 25: Fourth Battle of Tell el Eisa
    - October 25–26: Battle of Point 29
  - October 26–28: The German Counter Attack
    - October 27: Battle of Position Snipe
    - October 28 - November 1: Battle of Thompson's Post
  - November 1–2: Operation Supercharge
    - November 2: Battle of Tell el Aqqaqir
    - November 2–4: Battle of Sidi Abdel Rahman
    - November 2: Battle of Himeimat
- Operation Torch
  - November 8–16 Battle of Casablanca
  - November 8–10: Operation Blackstone
  - November 8–10: Operation Brushwood
  - November 8–10: Operation Goalpost
  - November 8: Battle of Arzew
  - November 8: Operation Reservist
  - November 8: Battle of Tafarquay Airfield
  - November 8: Battle of Youk-Les-Bains Airfield
  - November 8: Battle of Algiers
    - November 8: Operation Terminal
- Operation Supercharge continued
  - November 7: Battle of Marsa Matruh
  - November 9: Battle of Sidi Barrani
  - November 9: Third Battle of Halfaya Pass
  - November 13:Battle of Agedabia
  - November 13: Third Battle of Torbuk
  - November 17–26: Battle of Djebel Abiod
  - November 20: Second Battle of Benghazi
  - December 12: Second Battle of the Coast Road
  - December 14–16: Second Battle of El Agheila
  - December 15: Battle of Wadi Zem Zem (or Buerat)
  - December 25: Battle of Sirte
- Tunisia campaign
  - November 24: First Battle of Medjez
  - November 24: First Battle of Djedeida Airfield
  - November 26: Battle of Djebel Abiod
  - November 27: Second Battle of Medjez
  - November 28: Second Battle of Djedeida Airfield
  - December 1: First Battle of Tebourba
  - December 2–3: First Battle of Faid Pass
  - December 16–17: Battle of Maknassy
  - December 22–23: First Battle of Longstop Hill
  - December 22–25: Second Battle of Tebourba

== 1943 ==
- Eighth Army Offensive continued
  - Jan. 23: Battle of Tripoli
- Tunisian campaign continued
  - January 14: Battle of Faïd Pass
  - February 14–17: Battle of Sidi Bou Zid
  - February 19–24: Battle of Kasserine Pass
  - February 26 - March 4: Operation Ochsenkopf (Ox Head)
  - March 6: Operation Capri
    - March 6: Battle of Medenine
  - March 16–27: Operation Pugilist
    - March 16–23: Battle of Mareth
  - March 23 – April 7: Battle of El Guettar
  - March 26–28: Operation Supercharge II
    - March 26: Battle of Tebaga Gap
  - April 6: Battle of Wadi Akarit
  - April 22 – May 6: Operation Vulcan
    - April 22–23: Second Battle of Longstop Hill
  - May 6–13: Operation Strike
