= Battle of Tripoli (1943) =

Allied victory in North Africa during WWII

- Part of the North African Campaign
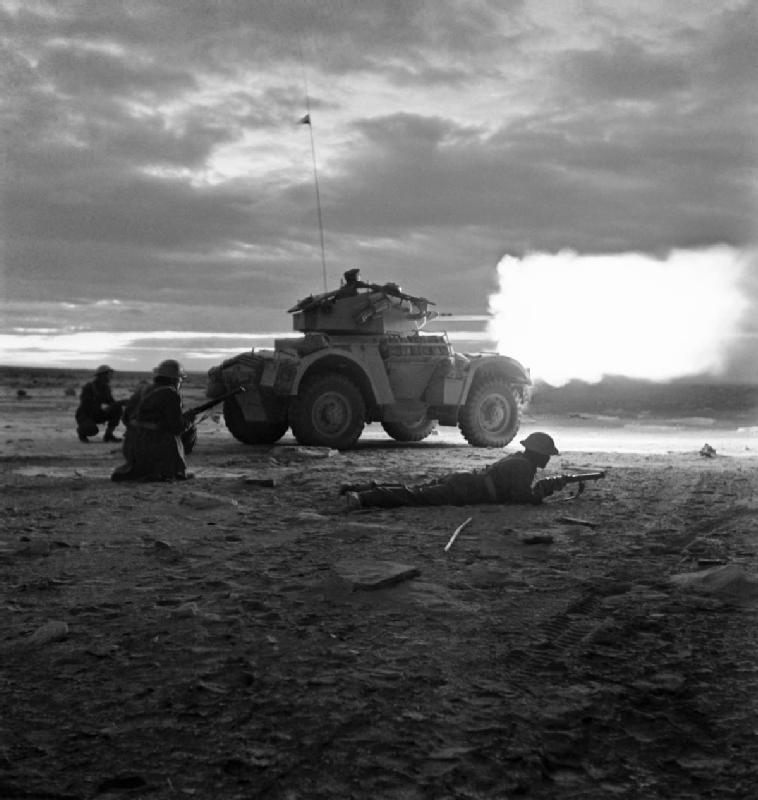
- A Daimler armoured car opens fire in the gloom of early morning at the start of the battle for Tripoli, 18 January 1943.
| Date | 22–23 January 1943 |
| Location | Tripoli, Tripolitania, (Italian Libya) |
| Result | Allied victory |

Belligerents
| Italy; Germany | United Kingdom; New Zealand; Australia |

Commanders and leaders
| (Kingdom of Italy) Ettore Bastico (Nazi Germany) Erwin Rommel | (United Kingdom) Harold Alexander (United Kingdom) Bernard Montgomery |

Units involved
| German-Italian Panzer Army | British Eighth Army |

The Battle of Tripoli was an engagement on between the German-Italian Panzer Army commanded by Erwin Rommel of Nazi Germany and Ettore Bastico of Kingdom of Italy, who held the town, and the British 8th Army, a Commonwealth force commanded by Sir Bernard Montgomery. After a short siege, the Italian and German forces withdrew from Tripoli, and the Allies entered the town to great worldwide fanfare.

== Prelude ==
After the Italian and German defeat in the Second Battle of El Alamein in November 1942, German commander Erwin Rommel shed many of his slower Italian units, leaving 30,000-75,000 men to be taken as prisoners, and dashed for Tunisia. Over the next 80 days, he withdrew 1,400 miles across Libya, losing 130 tanks and 1,000 artillery guns. At the same time as the Second Battle of El Alamein, Operation Torch deposited approximately 83,300 U.S. and 23,000 British soldiers in three task forces in an invasion of French North Africa, in Morocco and Algeria on 8 November 1942. Rommel had to reach his supply ports in Tunisia before both armies could cut him off.

== Combat ==
Rommel dug a defensive line at Buerat, some 200 miles east of Tripoli, but this collapsed on January 15, 1943. In a series of desperate rear guard actions, Rommel defended his flanks while driving his main body west. Misurata fell on January 18, Homs on the 20th, El Aziez on the 21st, Castelverde on the 22nd. Montgomery predicted to reporters that Tripoli would fall on January 22. Rommel did not stop to form a defensive line in Tripoli, abandoning the town that night. The 1st Gordons, 51st Highlanders, riding 40 Royal Tank Regiment vehicles, entered Tripoli unopposed the next morning.

== Aftermath ==
Montgomery ordered a huge victory parade in Tripoli on 23 January 1943. On 3 February 1943, Prime Minister Winston Churchill addressed 8th Army in Tripoli. "Let me then assure you, soldiers and airmen, that your fellow-countrymen regard your joint work with admiration and gratitude, and that after the war when a man is asked what he did it will be quite sufficient for him to say, 'I marched and fought with the Desert Army.' And when history is written and all the facts are known, our feats will gleam and glow and will be a source of song and story long after we who are gathered here have passed away."

Rommel successfully withdrew to Tunisia, where he was reinforced with Tiger tanks and more infantry. But it was too little, too late. 1st and 8th Armies merged into the 18th Army Group; together with the Americans, they breached the Mareth Line. By May 1943, Some 50,000 Axis soldiers surrendered, ending the North African Campaign.
