= Alexander Hamilton-Gordon (British Army officer, born 1859) =

British Army officer (1859–1939)

Lieutenant-General Sir Alexander Hamilton-Gordon KCB
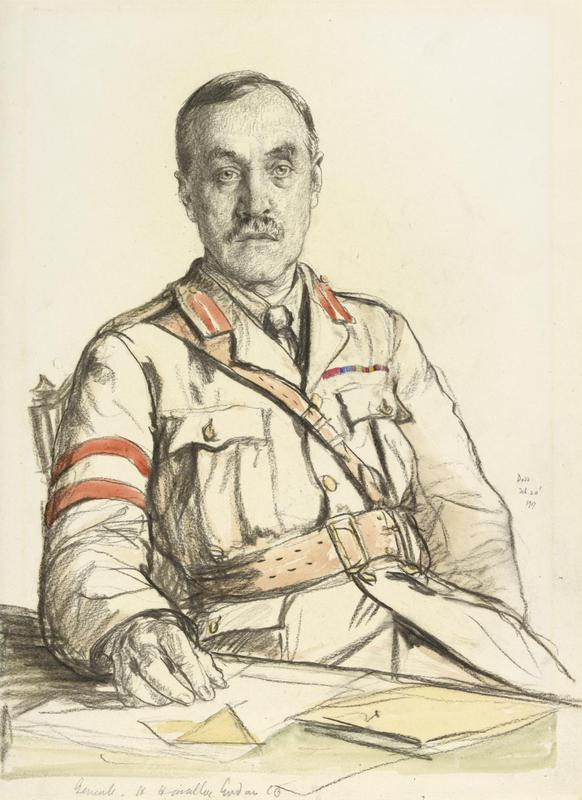
- 1917 portrait by Francis Dodd
- Born: 6 July 1859
- Died: 13 February 1939 (aged 79)
- Military career
- Allegiance: United Kingdom
- Branch: British Army
- Service years: 1880–1920
- Rank: Lieutenant-General
- Unit: Royal Artillery
- Commands: IX Corps; Aldershot Command
- Conflicts: Second Anglo-Afghan War; Second Boer War; First World War
- Awards: Knight Commander of the Order of the Bath; Mentioned in Despatches (4); Grand Officer of the Order of the Crown (Belgium); Croix de Guerre (Belgium); Knight of the Legion of Honour (France)

Lieutenant-General Sir Alexander Hamilton-Gordon, KCB (6 July 1859 – 13 February 1939) was a British Army officer who served in World War I.

== Early life ==
Hamilton-Gordon was one of ten children of General Sir Alexander Hamilton-Gordon and Caroline Herschel. His paternal grandfather was George Hamilton-Gordon, 4th Earl of Aberdeen, Prime Minister of the United Kingdom from 1852 until 1855. His maternal grandfather was John Herschel.

== Military career ==
Educated at Winchester College followed by the Royal Military Academy, Woolwich, Hamilton-Gordon was commissioned into the British Army's Royal Artillery in February 1880. His first military service was in the Second Anglo-Afghan War in 1880.

Hamilton-Gordon later served in the Second Boer War, taking part in actions at Ladysmith, Spion Kop, Vaal Kranz and Tugela Heights. He became Deputy Assistant Adjutant General for Intelligence in South Africa in early 1901.

Arriving back in the United Kingdom, he briefly became an instructor at the School of Gunnery before he was appointed a Deputy Assistant Quarter-Master-General of the 1st Army Corps at Aldershot in October 1901. His next posting was to the War Office as an assistant quartermaster general, taking over from Colonel Percy Lake and for which he was granted the brevet rank of colonel. He was made a Companion of the Order of the Bath in June 1907 and was promoted to colonel in June 1909.

On 25 March 1910, Hamilton-Gordon took a posting as director of military operations in India and was granted the temporary rank of brigadier general while employed in this role. He served in India until 1914, when, now a major general, he became General Officer Commanding-in-Chief for Aldershot Command.

In June 1916, he was promoted to temporary lieutenant general and given command of IX Corps, serving at the Battle of Messines and the Third Battle of the Aisne. He was relieved in 1918 and retired from the army in June 1920.

== Family ==
In 1888, Hamilton-Gordon married Isabel Newmarch, with whom he had three children.

Hamilton-Gordon died on 13 February 1939.

Military offices
Preceded by Sir Douglas Haig	GOC-in-C Aldershot Command; 1914–1916	Succeeded by Sir Archibald Hunter
Preceded by Julian Byng	GOC IX Corps; 1916–1918	Succeeded by Walter Braithwaite
