= King George V Hospital (Gibraltar) =

- Gibraltar Health Authority

Geography
- Location: Gibraltar
- Coordinates: 36.127968°N 5.349875°W

Organisation
- Type: Specialist

Services
- Beds: 63 in 1799
- Speciality: Psychiatric hospital

Links
- Lists: Hospitals in Gibraltar

King George V Hospital (colloquially KG5) was a psychiatric hospital in the British Overseas Territory of Gibraltar run by the Gibraltar Health Authority. The hospital was established before 1799. The mental health facility underwent renovation in 2012. In 1799, the King George V Psychiatric Unit had beds for 63 patients.
