= IX Corps (United Kingdom) =

World War-era British Army formation

IX Corps IX Corps District
- Formation sign of IX Corps during the Second World War.
- Active: 1915–1919; 1941–1943
- Country: United Kingdom
- Branch: British Army
- Type: Corps
- Engagements: First World War: Gallipoli Campaign; Battle of Messines (1917); Third Battle of Ypres; Battles of the Lys; Battle of the Aisne 1918; Battles of the Hindenburg Line; Final Advance in Picardy; Second World War: Tunisian Campaign

Commanders
- Notable commanders: Frederick Stopford; Julian Byng; Alexander Hamilton-Gordon; Walter Braithwaite; John Crocker; Brian Horrocks

Insignia
- Corps formation sign during the First World War.

IX Corps was a corps-sized formation of the British Army that existed during the First and the Second World Wars.

== First World War ==
The IX Corps was formed in England in 1915 in readiness to make a new landing at Suvla during the Battle of Gallipoli. Headquarters was formed at the Tower of London. Command of the corps was given to Lieutenant-General Sir Frederick Stopford. His handling of the corps during the August offensive, the Battle of Sari Bair warranted his replacement after only nine days with Lieutenant-General Julian Byng.

During the Gallipoli campaign the corps comprised the following divisions:

- 10th (Irish) Division
- 11th (Northern) Division
- 13th (Western) Division
- 53rd (Welsh) Division
- 54th (East Anglian) Division
- 2nd Mounted Division
- IX Corps Signals was provided by London District Signals, Royal Engineers

Following the British evacuation of Gallipoli, the corps was moved to France in 1916, where it was commanded by Alexander Hamilton-Gordon until he was relieved in 1918.

In April 1918 the corps was allotted those divisions which had suffered severe casualties in the fighting during the Operation Michael the First Battle of the Somme (1918) and the Battle of the Lys,

- 8th Division
- 19th (Western) Division
- 21st Division
- 25th Division
- 50th (Northumbrian) Division

These divisions were moved south to a quiet sector to reform. This sector was the unlucky target of the next German offensive, the Third Battle of the Aisne in May–June 1918, causing further losses to IX Corps. General Denis Duchêne, commander of the French Sixth Army, had deployed IX Corps (five divisions) too far forward, on the Chemin des Dames ridge, which had been gained at such cost in the Second Battle of the Aisne the previous year. (The French Commander-in-Chief Philippe Pétain and the Army Group Commander Franchet d’Esperey would have preferred the ridge to be lightly held and the main defence to be a battle zone between it and the River Aisne).

In September 1918 the following divisions joined the corps:

- 6th Infantry Division

At the time of the Armistice the IX Corps was part of the Fourth Army.

== Second World War ==
Disbanded in 1919 after the First World War, IX Corps was reformed during the Second World War in Britain in April 1941, under the command of Lieutenant-General Ridley Pakenham-Walsh. The 59th (Staffordshire) Infantry Division and the Durham and North Riding County Division transferred to IX Corps from X Corps on 9 April 1941, which suggests this is the date the IX Corps became effective. The Northumberland County Division joined IX Corps the following day.

The 15th (Scottish) Infantry Division was transferred to the corps, commanded by Lieutenant-General Edwin Morris, on 21 November 1941. On 30 November, both of the county divisions were disbanded, and on 1 December 1941, the corps was renamed IX Corps District. The 15th Division left the IX Corps District on 28 September 1942, to transfer to Northumbrian District, suggesting the corps temporarily ceased to be operational on this date.

IX Corps, now commanded by Lieutenant-General John Crocker, was sent to take part in the Tunisian Campaign in the British First Army (Lieutenant-General Kenneth Anderson). The IX Corps headquarters, with Brigadier Gordon MacMillan as its chief of staff, landed in and opened as the reserve for the Allied 18th Army Group on 24 March 1943. The 6th Armoured Division transferred to the corps from V Corps on 12 March 1943. The corps also took command of the US 34th Infantry Division and the 128th Infantry Brigade Group, part of the 46th Infantry Division and commenced an attack on Pinchon-Fondouk on the southern flank of the First Army.

For the final offensive in North Africa several veteran formations from the Eighth Army (General Sir Bernard Montgomery) arrived to reinforce the IX Corps, which was to play a leading role in the final offensive. The British 7th Armoured Division, from the Eighth Army, joined IX Corps on 30 April. The 4th Indian Infantry Division, also from the Eighth Army, joined on 30 April, followed by the 201st Guards Brigade, with the 4th Infantry Division joining on 3 May. This gave IX Corps, now commanded by Lieutenant-General Brian Horrocks (replacing Crocker who had been injured by a PIAT in a training incident), two armoured divisions and two infantry divisions. The final assault commenced on 5 May with the two infantry divisions forcing the Medjez-el-Bab gap, through which the two armoured divisions passed through to bring about the eventual surrender of the Axis forces on 13 May 1943.

With the surrender of almost 250,000 Axis soldiers in North Africa, the 7th Armoured Division transferred to V Corps on 18 May 1943, the 4th Infantry Division following it four days later, and the 6th Armoured Division (with the attached 201st Guards Brigade) on 26 May. IX Corps, with no commander after Horrocks returned to X Corps and as Crocker was still injured, was disbanded on 31 May 1943.

== General Officers Commanding ==
First World War commanders included:

- Lieutenant-General Sir Frederick Stopford (17 June 1915–16 August 1915)
- Major-General Beauvoir De Lisle (temporary) (16–24 August 1915)
- Lieutenant-General Sir Julian Byng (24 August 1915 – 8 February 1916)
- Lieutenant-General Sir Francis Davies (8 February – 20 June 1916)
- Lieutenant-General Alexander Hamilton-Gordon (20 June 1916 – 16 July 1918)
- Major-General Sir Robert Whigham (temporary) (16 July – 22 July 1918)
- Major-General Harold Higginson (temporary) (22 July – 30 July 1918)
- Lieutenant-General Sir Alexander Hamilton-Gordon (30 July – 10 September 1918)
- Major-General Peter Strickland (temporary) (10 September – 13 September 1918)
- Lieutenant-General Walter Braithwaite (from 13 September 1918)

Second World War commanders included:

- Lieutenant-General Ridley Pakenham-Walsh (7 June 1941 – 17 November 1941)
- Lieutenant-General Edwin Morris (18 November 1941 – 31 January 1942)
- Lieutenant-General Francis Nosworthy (1 February 1942–11 September 1942)
- Lieutenant-General John Crocker (12 September 1942 – 29 April 1943)
- Lieutenant-General Brian Horrocks (29 April 1943–3 June 1943)

== Online sources ==
- Army Commands at Colin Mackie's website
- British Military History
- First World War Biographies
- Liddell Hart Centre for Military Archives
- The Long, Long Trail
- Royal Munster Fusiliers website
