= First Army (United Kingdom) =

- 1st Army formation badge, Second World War
- Active: First World War; 1914–1918; Second World War; 1942–1943
- Country: United Kingdom
- Branch: British Army
- Type: Army
- Size: Field army
- Engagements: First World War; Western Front; Second World War; Operation Torch; Tunisia Campaign

Commanders
- Notable commanders: Sir Douglas Haig; Sir Henry Rawlinson; Sir Kenneth Anderson

The First Army was a formation of the British Army that existed during the First and Second World Wars. The First Army included Indian and Portuguese forces during the First World War and American and French units during the Second World War.

== First World War ==
The First Army was part of the British Army during the First World War and was formed on 26 December 1914 when the corps of the British Expeditionary Force were divided into the First Army under Lieutenant-General Sir Douglas Haig and the Second Army under Horace Smith-Dorrien. First Army had the Ist, IVth and the Indian Corps under command. It made advances of 1,200 yards at the beginning of the Battle of Neuve Chapelle in March 1915 before the momentum died out. The First Army suffered reverses at Vimy Ridge in May 1916 and at Fromelles the following month. From 1917, the First Army also included the Portuguese Expeditionary Corps. The First Army took part in the 1918 offensive that drove the Germans back and virtually ended the war.

=== Commanders ===
- 26 December 1914 – 22 December 1915 General Sir Douglas Haig
- 22 December 1915 – 4 February 1916 General Sir Henry Rawlinson
- 4 February – 7 August 1916 General Sir Charles Monro
- 7 August – 30 September 1916 Lieutenant-General Sir Richard Haking (temporary)
- 30 September 1916 – 1918 General Sir Henry Horne

== Second World War ==
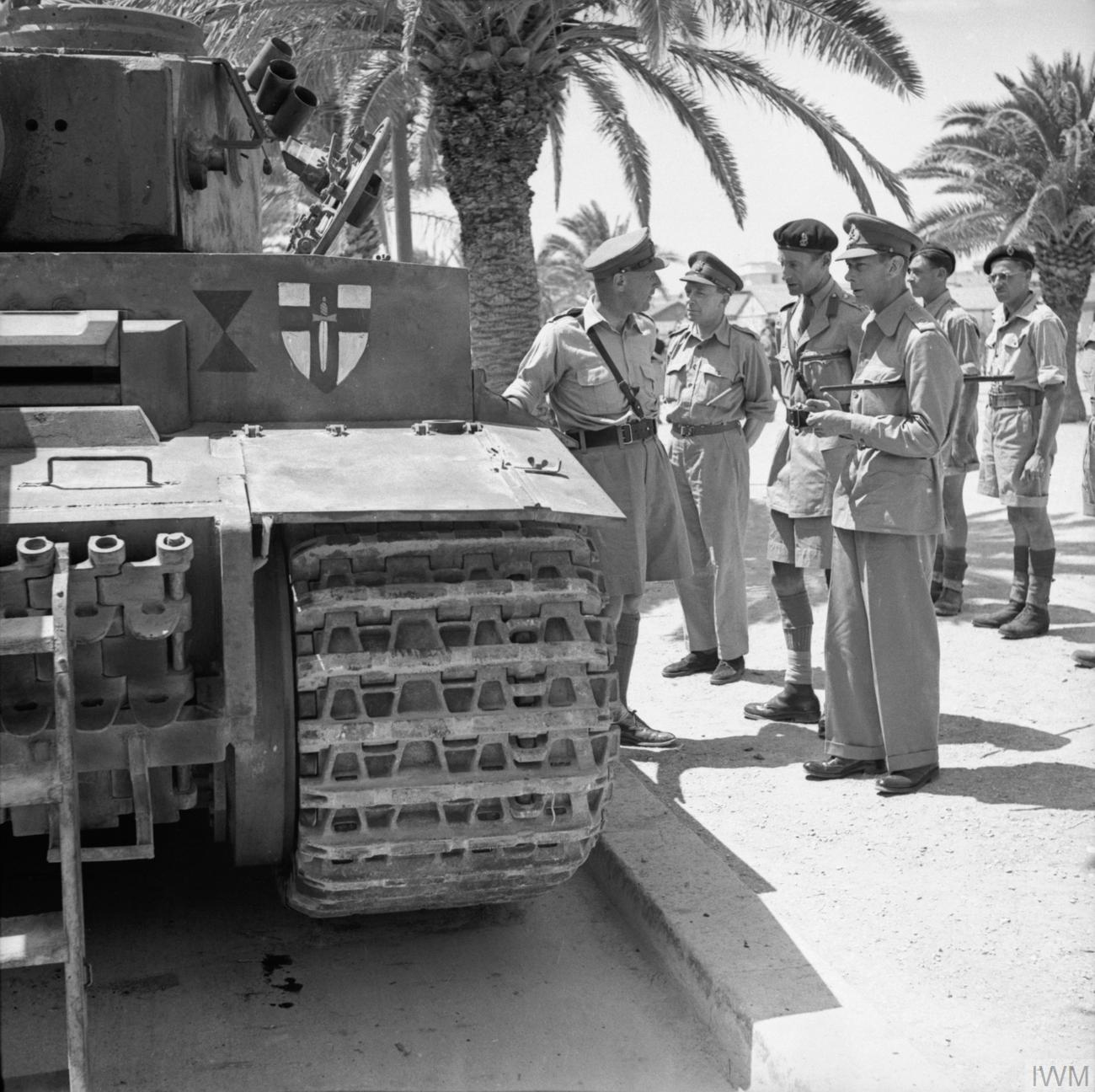
The badge of the First Army painted on a captured Tiger tank, being inspected by King George VI Tunis, June 1943.

The British First Army was reformed during the Second World War. It was formed to command the American and British land forces which had landed as part of Operation Torch, the Allied invasion of French North Africa, in Morocco and Algeria on 8 November 1942. It was commanded by Lieutenant-General Sir Kenneth Anderson. The First Army headquarters was formally activated on 9 November 1942 when Anderson arrived in Algiers to assume command of the redesignated Eastern Task Force.

The First Army initially consisted of American and British formations only. After the surrender of French forces following the German abrogation of their armistice agreement with Vichy France, French units were also added to the First Army's order of battle. It eventually consisted of four corps, the US II Corps, the British V Corps, British IX Corps and French XIX Corps.

After the landings, Anderson's forces rushed east in a bid to capture Tunis and Bizerte before German forces could reach the two cities in large numbers. They failed. Following that lack of success, a period of consolidation was forced upon them. The logistics support for the First Army was greatly improved and bases for its accompanying aircraft greatly multiplied. By the time General Sir Bernard Montgomery's British Eighth Army approached the Tunisian border from the east, following its long pursuit of Generalfeldmarschall Erwin Rommel's forces after El Alamein, the First Army was again ready to strike.

Supported by elements of XII Tactical Air Command and No. 242 Group RAF, the First Army carried the main weight of General Sir Harold Alexander's 18th Army Group's offensive to conclude the Tunisian Campaign and finish Axis forces in North Africa off. The victory was won in May 1943 in a surrender that, in numbers captured at least, equalled Stalingrad. Shortly after the surrender, the First Army was disbanded, having served its purpose.

=== Commanders ===
- July 1942 – August 1942 Lieutenant-General Edmond Schreiber
- August 1942 – July 1943 Lieutenant-General Kenneth Anderson

== See also ==
- British First Army order of battle, 20 April 1943
- British First Army order of battle, 4 May 1943
