= Kenneth Anderson (British Army officer) =

British Army general (1891–1959)

General Sir Kenneth Anderson KCB MC
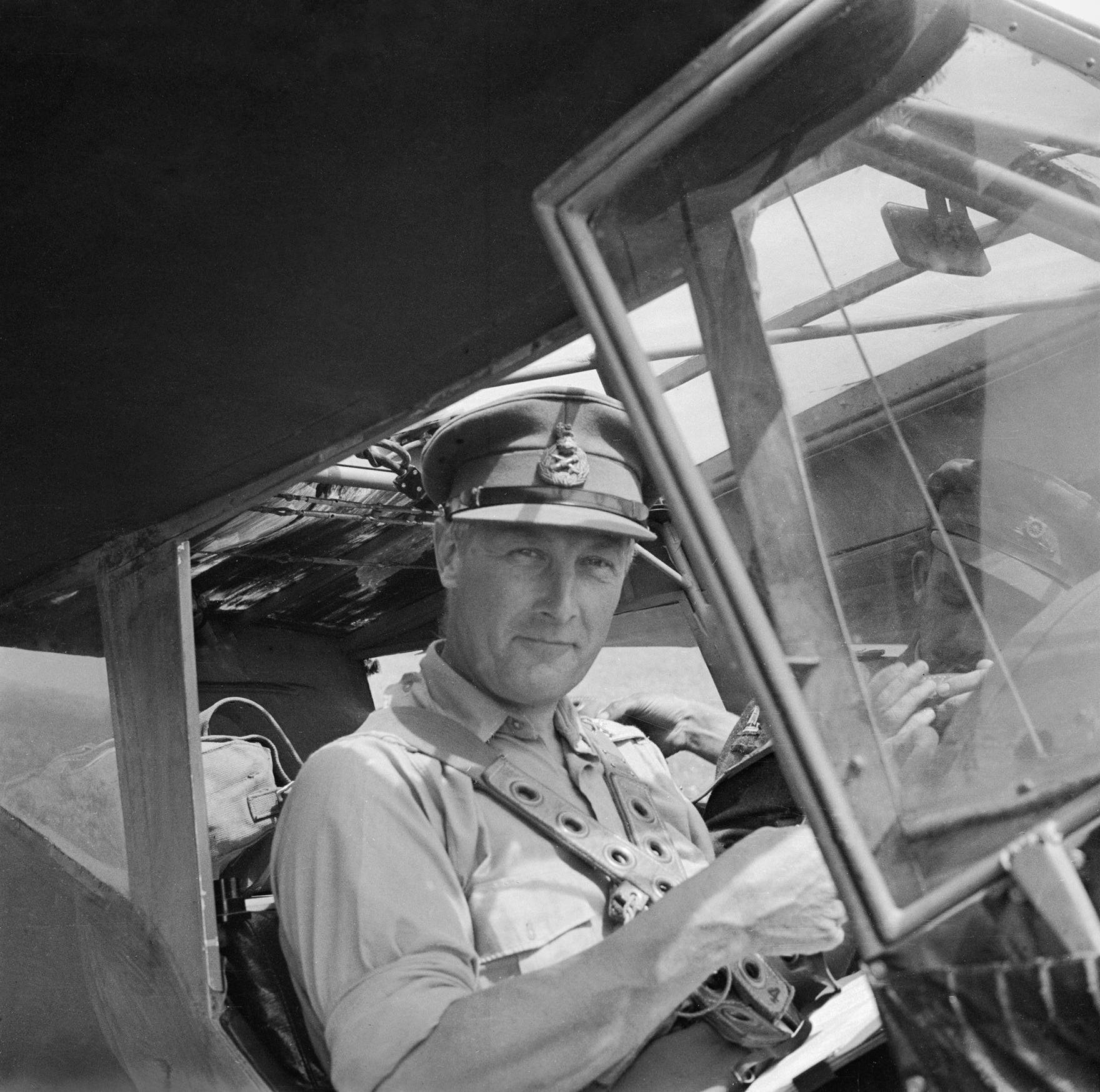
- Anderson in 1943
- Born: 25 December 1891; Madras, British India
- Died: 29 April 1959 (aged 67); King George V Hospital, Gibraltar
- Burial place: North Front Cemetery, Gibraltar
- Military career
- Allegiance: United Kingdom
- Branch: British Army
- Service years: 1911–1952
- Rank: General
- Nickname: "Sunshine"
- Service number: 12023
- Unit: Seaforth Highlanders
- Commands: East Africa Command (1945–1946); Eastern Command (1942, 1944); Second Army (1943–1944); First Army (1942–1943); II Corps (1941–1942); VIII Corps (1941); 1st Infantry Division (1940–1941); 11th Infantry Brigade (1938–1940); 152nd (Seaforth and Cameron Highlanders) Infantry Brigade; 2nd Battalion, Seaforth Highlanders
- Conflicts: First World War; North West Frontier; Second World War
- Awards: Knight Commander of the Order of the Bath; Military Cross; Mentioned in Despatches (2); Knight of the Order of St John; Chief Commander of the Legion of Merit (United States); Commander of the Legion of Honour (France); Croix de guerre (France); Grand Cross of the Order of Ouissam Alaouite (Morocco); Grand Cordon of the Order of Glory (Tunisia); Grand Cross of the Order of the Star of Ethiopia

General Sir Kenneth Arthur Noel Anderson, KCB, MC (25 December 1891 – 29 April 1959) was a senior British Army officer who saw service in both world wars. He is mainly remembered as the commander of the British First Army during Operation Torch, the Allied invasion of North Africa and the subsequent Tunisian campaign which ended with the capture of almost 250,000 Axis soldiers. An outwardly reserved character, he did not court popularity either with his superiors or with the public.

His American superior, General Dwight D. Eisenhower, wrote that he was "blunt, at times to the point of rudeness". In consequence he is less well known than many of his contemporaries. According to Richard Mead, however, "he handled a difficult campaign more competently than his critics suggest, but competence without flair was not good enough for a top commander in 1944."

== Early life and First World War ==
Kenneth Arthur Noel Anderson was born on 25 December 1891 in Madras, British India, the son of Arthur Robert Anderson, a Scottish railway engineer, and Charlotte Gertrude Isabella Duffy Fraser.

He was sent to England, where he was educated at Charterhouse School and the Royal Military College, Sandhurst before being commissioned as a second lieutenant in the Seaforth Highlanders, a line infantry regiment of the British Army, on 19 September 1911. He was sent to join the 1st Battalion in British India and was promoted to lieutenant on 29 November 1913.

Still in India upon the outbreak of the First World War in August 1914, Anderson's battalion, commanded by Archibald Ritchie, was sent to the Western Front, arriving there late the following month, as part of the Dehra Dun Brigade of the 7th (Meerut) Division, and remained with his battalion throughout the many battles it was involved in. He was promoted to the acting rank of captain on 10 April 1915, and captain on 1 October 1915.

He was, between 24 December 1915 and 3 July 1916, adjutant of the 23rd (Service) Battalion of the Northumberland Fusiliers (4th Tyneside Scottish), a Kitchener's Army unit serving as part of the 102nd (Tyneside Scottish) Brigade of the 34th Division. He was awarded the Military Cross (MC) for bravery in action and was wounded during the Battle of the Somme on the opening day of the battle, 1 July 1916. Anderson was one of 629 casualties, which included 19 officers, sustained by the battalion on that day. The citation for his MC read:

For conspicuous gallantry. Captain Anderson was severely wounded in front of an enemy first line trench. He endeavoured to struggle on, but progress was impossible as one of his legs was broken. Nevertheless, although exposed to heavy fire, he continued to direct and encourage his men.

He took eighteen months to recover from the wounds he received, before rejoining the 1st Battalion, Seaforths, by then in Palestine, in time to celebrate victory. He was appointed to the acting rank of major on 12 May 1918, and reverted to captain in July 1919.

On 12 February 1918, Anderson married Kathleen Lorna May Gamble (1894–1983), the only daughter of Sir Reginald Arthur Gamble and his wife Jennie. Her brother was Captain Ralph Dominic Gamble, of the Coldstream Guards. They had two children, Michael Iain Anderson, born in 1927, and a daughter.

== Between the wars ==
Anderson's military career during the interwar period was active. He served as adjutant to the Scottish Horse from 1920 to 1924, and was promoted to major during this posting. He attended the Staff College, Quetta from 1927 to 1928, where he apparently did not do that well. His superior, Colonel Percy Hobart, thought it "questionable whether he had the capacity to develop much." Other staff council also had reservations, but "hoped that he might suffice". His fellow students in his year there included several who would achieve high command, such as Frederick Morgan, David Cowan, Geoffrey Bruce, Harold Briggs, along with Ronald Hopkins of the Australian Army. Those above included William Slim and James Steele, while those below included Douglas Gracey, John Crocker, Henry Davies, Colin Gubbins and Australian George Vasey and E. L. M. Burns of the Canadian Army.

Anderson, after graduating from Quetta, became a General staff Officer Grade 2 (GSO2) in the 50th (Northumbrian) Division, a Territorial Army (TA) formation. In 1930 Anderson was promoted to lieutenant colonel on 2 June 1930 became commanding officer (CO) of the 2nd Battalion, Seaforths in the North West Frontier, for which he was mentioned in despatches and, returning to Scotland, as a full colonel, went on to command the 152nd (Seaforth and Cameron) Infantry Brigade, part of the 51st (Highland) Infantry Division, another TA unit, in August 1934. Still as a full colonel in March 1936 he was appointed to a staff job (GSO1) in India and in January 1938 was appointed acting brigadier to command of the 11th Infantry Brigade, part of the 4th Infantry Division, then commanded by Major-General Dudley Johnson, which he trained hard, despite inadequate equipment.

== Second World War ==
=== France and Belgium ===
Shortly after the outbreak of the Second World War, in September 1939, Anderson led the 11th Brigade, still part of the 4th Division, overseas to France where it became part of the British Expeditionary Force (BEF). Anderson saw service with the BEF throughout the "Phoney War" period and during the Battle of France in May 1940 and, when Major-General Bernard Montgomery, general officer commanding (GOC) of the 3rd Infantry Division, was promoted to command II Corps during the evacuation from France, the departing II Corps GOC, Lieutenant-General Sir Alan Brooke, chose Anderson, of whom he thought highly, to take temporary command of Montgomery's 3rd Division.

=== United Kingdom ===
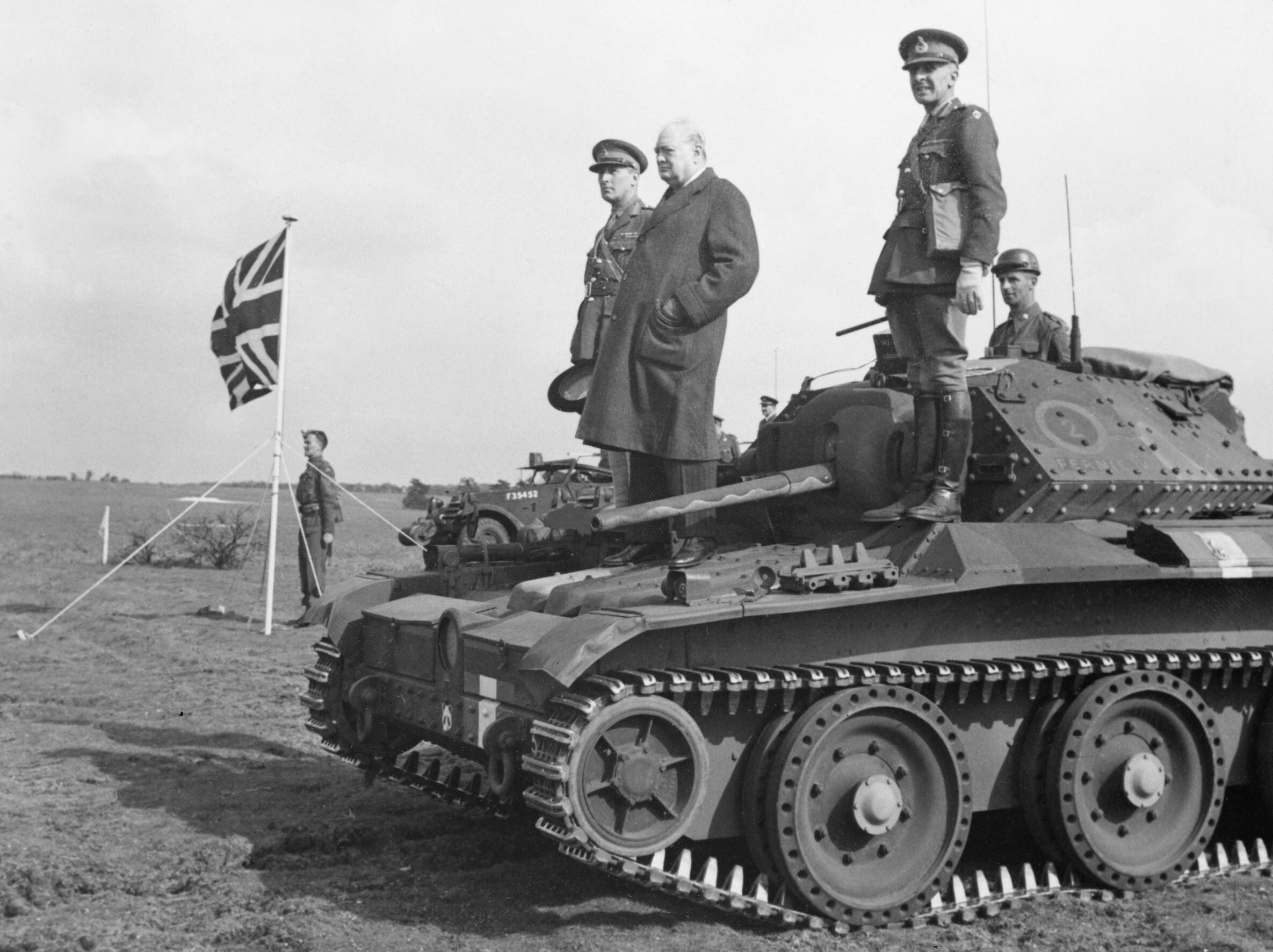
Lieutenant-General Kenneth Anderson standing to the right of Winston Churchill, behind him is Major-General Brian Horrocks (nearest the camera) on a Covenanter tank of the 4th/7th Royal Dragoon Guards to take the salute at an inspection of the 9th Armoured Division near Newmarket, Suffolk, 16 May 1942.

Upon returning to the United Kingdom after the withdrawal from Dunkirk, Anderson briefly returned to his 11th Brigade. However, on 13 June, he was promoted to the acting rank of major-general and became GOC of the 1st Infantry Division, which had fought in France. His rank of major-general was made permanent on 17 June 1940 (with seniority backdated to 26 July 1938). The division was tasked with defending the coast of Lincolnshire against a German invasion and was serving under the command of I Corps, commanded by Lieutenant-General Sir Harold Alexander, who had commanded the 1st Division in France and with whom Anderson would encounter later, itself serving under Northern Command. On 11 July he was made a Companion of the Order of the Bath, and on 26 July 1940 was mentioned in despatches for his service in France and Belgium.

On 18 May 1941 Anderson handed over the division to Major-General Edwin Morris and was promoted to the acting rank of lieutenant-general and given command of VIII Corps, which he commanded until December before assuming command of II Corps. The duration of his stay with II Corps was not long, however, as in April 1942, after being succeeded as GOC by Lieutenant-General James Steele, he was promoted to General Officer Commanding-in-Chief (GOC-in-C) of Eastern Command. On 19 May his rank of lieutenant-general was made temporary.

Despite his lack of experience in commanding larger formations in battle, in August 1942 Anderson was given command of the First Army, replacing Lieutenant-General Edmond Schreiber who had developed a kidney disease and was not considered fit enough for active service in the Army's planned involvement in Operation Torch, codename for the Allied invasion of French North Africa. The first choice replacement, Lieutenant-General Sir Harold Alexander, had been almost immediately selected to replace General Sir Claude Auchinleck as Commander-in-chief (C-in-C) of Middle East Command in Cairo, Egypt and his replacement, Lieutenant-General Bernard Montgomery, was himself redirected to the Western Desert to command the British Eighth Army, following the death of Lieutenant-General William Gott, the original nominee. Anderson, therefore, became the fourth commander in no more than a week. Despite his new appointment, it was still somewhat strange for Anderson, with no experience in command in battle of anything above a brigade, to receive such an important assignment. The most likely reason is that, even at this stage of the war, there simply were not enough experienced senior commanders to go around. One man in particular who believed this to be true was the-then Chief of the Imperial General Staff (CIGS), General Sir Alan Brooke, who had been Anderson's corps commander in France two years earlier. In his diary in October 1941 he wrote: "...it is lamentable how poor we are in Army and Corps commanders; we ought to remove several, but Heaven knows where we will find anything very much better." Despite this, Brooke actually formed a very high opinion of Anderson, although this would fade in time.

=== North Africa ===
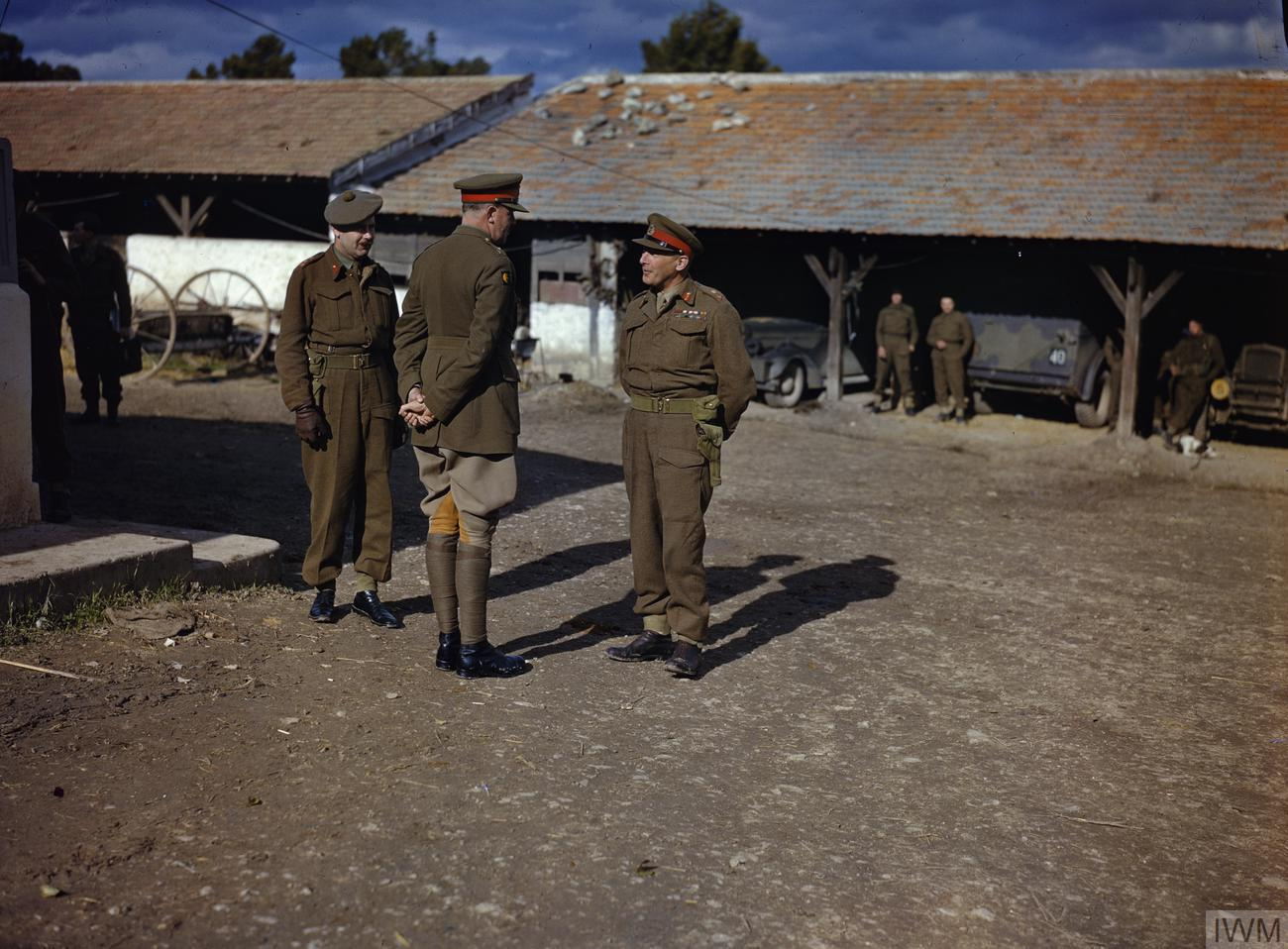
Lieutenant-General K. A. N. Anderson (right) on a visit to 78th Infantry Division's HQ in Tunisia, January 1943. Brigadier C. B. McNabb, Anderson's Brigadier General Staff (BGS), is on the left, with Major-General V. Evelegh, GOC 78th Division, on the right.

Following the Torch landings, which occurred in early November 1942, although much of his troops and equipment had yet to arrive, Anderson was keen to make an early advance from Algeria into Tunisia to forestall Axis occupation following the collapse of the Vichy French administration there. His force, at this stage barely a division strong, was engaged in late 1942 in a Run for Tunis before the Axis were able to build up their forces and launch a counter-attack. The run failed although elements of his force got to within 16 mi (26 km) of Tunis before being pushed back.

As more Allied forces arrived at the front they suffered from a lack of co-ordination. Eventually, in late January 1943, General Dwight D. Eisenhower, the American Supreme Allied Commander in the Mediterranean Theater of Operations (MTO), persuaded the French to place their new XIX Corps under the command of the First Army and also gave Anderson responsibility for the overall "employment of American troops", specifically the US II Corps, commanded by Major General Lloyd Fredendall. Control still proved difficult with forces spread over 200 mi (320 km) of front and poor means of communication (Anderson reported that he motored over 1,000 mi (1,600 km) in four days to speak to his corps commanders). Anderson and Fredendall also failed properly to coordinate and integrate forces under their command. Subordinates would later recall their utter confusion at being handed conflicting orders, not knowing which general to obey – Anderson or Fredendall. While Anderson was privately aghast at Fredendall's shortcomings, he seemed frozen by the need to preserve a united Allied front, and never risked his career by strongly protesting (or threatening to resign) over what many of his own American subordinates viewed as an untenable command structure.

The II Corps later suffered a serious defeat at the Battle of Kasserine Pass, where Generalfeldmarschall Erwin Rommel launched an offensive against Allied forces, first shattering French forces defending the central portion of the front, then routing the American II Corps in the south. While the lion's share of the blame fell on Fredendall, Anderson's generalship were also seriously questioned by British and Allied commanders. When Fredendall disclaimed all responsibility for the poorly-equipped French XIX Corps covering the vulnerable central section of the Tunisian front, denying their request for support, Anderson allowed the request to go unfulfilled. Anderson was also criticized for refusing Fredendall's request to retire to a defensible line after the initial assault to regroup his forces, allowing German panzer forces to overrun many of the American positions in the south. The US 1st Armored Division commander, Major General Orlando Ward, vehemently objected to the dispersal of his division's three combat commands on individual assignments requested by Anderson which he believed diluted the division's effectiveness and resulted in its severe losses.

His American subordinate, Major General Ernest N. Harmon (later to replace Ward as commander of the US 1st Armored Division) and Major General George S. Patton (who briefly replaced Fredendall in command of the US II Corps) thought little of Anderson's ability to control large forces in battle. Major General Harmon had been in Thala on the Algerian border, witnessing the stubborn resistance of the British Nickforce, which held the vital road leading into the Kasserine Pass against the heavy pressure of the 10th Panzer Division, which was under Rommel's command. Commanding Nickforce was Brigadier Cameron Nicholson, an effective combat leader who kept his remaining forces steady, under relentless German hammering. When the US 9th Infantry Division's attached artillery arrived in Thala after a four-day, 800 mi (1,300 km) dash, it seemed like a godsend to Harmon. Inexplicably, the 9th Division was ordered by Anderson to abandon Thala to the enemy and head for the village of Le Kef, 50 mi (80 km) away, to defend against an expected German attack. Nicholson pleaded with the American artillery commander, Brigadier General Stafford LeRoy Irwin, to ignore Anderson's order and stay. Harmon agreed with Nicholson and commanded, "Irwin, you stay right here!" The 9th Divisional artillery did stay, and with its 48 guns raining a year's worth of a (peacetime) allotment of shells, stopped the advancing Germans in their tracks. Unable to retreat under the withering fire, the Afrika Corps finally withdrew after dark. With the defeat at Thala, Rommel decided to end his offensive.

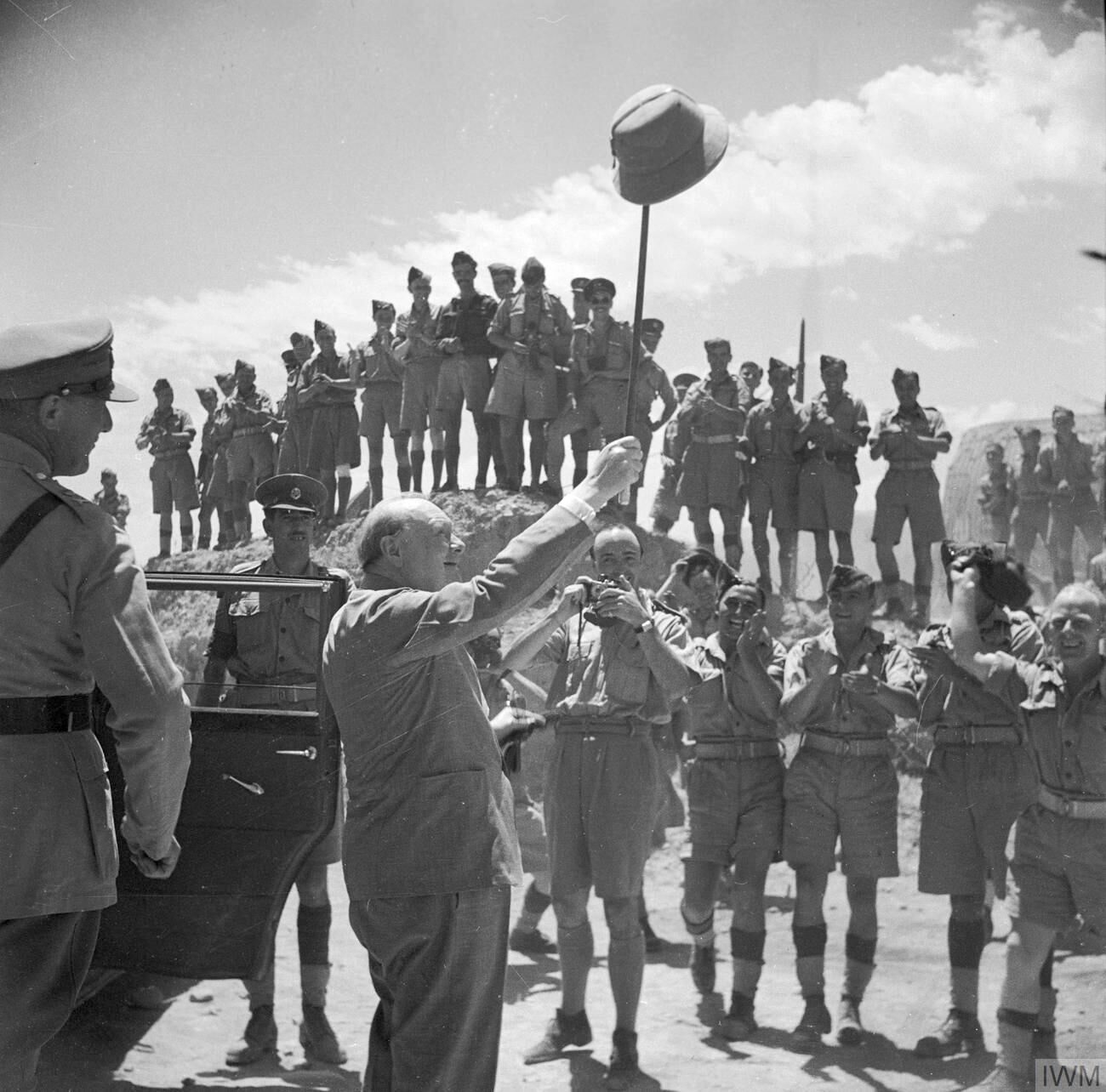
Prime Minister Winston Churchill salutes Allied troops in the amphitheatre at Carthage, during a visit to troops near Tunis, June 1943. Lieutenant-General Kenneth Anderson, the commander of the British First Army, is stood to the far left of the picture, with his back to the camera.

As Allied and Axis forces built up in Tunisia, 18th Army Group HQ was formed in February 1943 under General Sir Harold Alexander to control all Allied forces in Tunisia. Alexander wanted to replace Anderson with Lieutenant General Sir Oliver Leese, GOC XXX Corps of Montgomery's Eighth Army, and Montgomery felt that Leese was ready for such a promotion, writing on 17 March 1943 to Alexander "your wire re Oliver Leese. He has been through a very thorough training here and has learned his stuff well. I think he is quite fit to take command of First Army." Alexander later changed his mind, writing to Montgomery on 29 March that "I have considered the whole situation very carefully – I don't want to upset things at this stage." Anderson managed to hold on to his position and performed well after V Corps, under Lieutenant-General Charles Allfrey, held off the last Axis attack during Operation Ochsenkopf. In May 1943 he secured his position further when Allied forces achieved victory and the unconditional surrender of the Axis forces, 125,000 of whom were German. General Eisenhower, his superior officer, had stated after observing Anderson in action that he, "studied the written word until he practically burns through the paper" but later wrote of him that he was

...a gallant Scot, devoted to duty and absolutely selfless. Honest and straightforward, he was blunt, at times to the point of rudeness, and this trait, curiously enough, seemed to bring him into conflict with his British confreres more than it did with Americans. His real difficulty was shyness. He was not a popular type, but I had a real respect for his fighting heart. Even his most severe critic must find it difficult to discount the smashing victory he finally attained in Tunisia.

Anderson was the first recipient of the American Legion of Merit in the grade of Chief Commander, for his service as First Army commander in North Africa; he received his award on 18 June 1943. On his return to Britain from Tunis in July, after the disbandment of the First Army, Anderson was initially given command of the British Second Army during the preparations for Operation Overlord, the Allied invasion of Normandy. The Second Army was to form part of the Anglo-Canadian 21st Army Group, then under General Sir Bernard Paget. Anderson's rank of lieutenant-general was made substantive on July and he was advanced to Knight Commander of the Order of the Bath (KCB) in August. However, the criticisms by Alexander and Montgomery (who in March 1943 had written to Alexander saying, "it is obvious that Anderson is completely unfit to command any army" and later described him as, "a good plain cook") had gained currency and in late January 1944, soon after Montgomery arrived from fighting in Italy to take command of the 21st Army Group from Paget, Anderson was replaced by Lieutenant-General Miles Dempsey, a younger man and one of Montgomery's protégées. Brooke described it in his diary on 18 January:

Then a sad interview with Kenneth Anderson to tell him he would not be commanding the 2nd Army in the forthcoming offensive, as Dempsey is to replace him. He took it very well.

Anderson was given Eastern Command, his former command before taking over the First Army almost eighteen months earlier, which was widely viewed as a demotion. His career as a field commander was over and his last purely military appointment was as GOC-in-C East Africa Command.

== Post-war ==
After the war he was military C-in-C and Governor of Gibraltar, where his most notable achievements were to build new houses to relieve the poor housing conditions, and the constitutional changes which established a Legislative Council. He was promoted full general in July 1949 when he was made a Knight of the Venerable Order of Saint John and retired in June 1952 and lived mainly in the south of France. His last years were filled with tragedy: his only son, Michael, a lieutenant in the Seaforth Highlanders, died in action in Malaya, aged 22, on 12 November 1949 and his daughter also died after a long illness. Anderson himself died of pneumonia in Gibraltar on 29 April 1959, at the age of 67. His death, according to Gregory Blaxland, "caused little stir. He was one of nature's losers in the contest for fame."

== Bibliography ==
- Anderson, Lt.-General Kenneth (1946). Official despatch by Kenneth Anderson, GOC-in-C First Army covering events in NW Africa, 8 November 1942 – 13 May 1943 published in "No. 37779". The London Gazette (Supplement). 5 November 1946. pp. 5449–5464.
- Atkinson, Rick (2003). An Army at Dawn: The War in North Africa, 1942–1943. New York: Henry Holt & Co. ISBN 0-8050-7448-1.
- Blaxland, Gregory (1977). The Plain Cook and the Great Showman : The First and Eighth Armies in North Africa. Kimber. ISBN 0-7183-0185-4.
- Blumenson, Martin (1966). Kasserine Pass. Boston: Houghton Mifflin. OCLC 3947767.
- Callahan, Raymond (2007). Churchill and His Generals. University Press of Kansas, 2007. ISBN 978-070061512-4.
- Calhoun, Mark T. (2003). Defeat at Kasserine: American Armor Doctrine, Training, and Battle Command in Northwest Africa, World War II. Ft. Leavenworth, KS: Army Command and General Staff College.
- Eisenhower, Dwight D. (1997) [1948]. Crusade in Europe. Baltimore: Johns Hopkins University Press. ISBN 0-8018-5668-X.
- Hamilton, Nigel (1983). Master of the Battlefield: Monty's War Years 1942–1944. New York: McGraw-Hill. ISBN 0-07-025806-6.
- Mead, Richard (2007). Churchill's Lions: A Biographical Guide to the Key British Generals of World War II. Stroud (UK): Spellmount. p. 544 pages. ISBN 978-1-86227-431-0.
- Rolf, David (2015). The Bloody Road to Tunis: Destruction of the Axis Forces in North Africa, November 1942 – May 1943. London (UK): Frontline Books. ISBN 978-1-84832-783-2.
- Smart, Nick (2005). Biographical Dictionary of British Generals of the Second World War. Barnsley, UK: Pen & Sword Military. ISBN 1-84415-049-6.
- Watson, Bruce Allen (2007) [1999]. Exit Rommel: The Tunisian Campaign, 1942–43. Stackpole Military History Series. Mechanicsburg, PA: Stackpole Books. ISBN 978-0-8117-3381-6.
- The Times obituary (30 April 1959).

Military offices
Preceded by The Hon. Harold Alexander	GOC 1st Infantry Division; 1940–1941	Succeeded by Edwin Morris
Preceded by Harold Franklyn	GOC VIII Corps; May–November 1941	Succeeded by Edward Grasett
Preceded by Edmund Osborne	GOC II Corps; 1941–1942	Succeeded by James Steele
Preceded by Laurence Carr	GOC-in-C Eastern Command; April–August 1942	Succeeded by James Gammell
Preceded by Edmond Schreiber	GOC First Army; 1942–1943	Post disbanded
New command	GOC Second Army; 1943–1944	Succeeded by Miles Dempsey
Preceded by James Gammell	GOC-in-C Eastern Command; February–December 1944	Succeeded by Sir Alan Cunningham
Preceded by Sir William Platt	GOC East Africa Command; 1945–1946	Succeeded by William Dimoline
Government offices
Preceded by Sir Ralph Eastwood	Governor of Gibraltar; 1947–1952	Succeeded by Sir Gordon MacMillan
