= 18th Army Group =

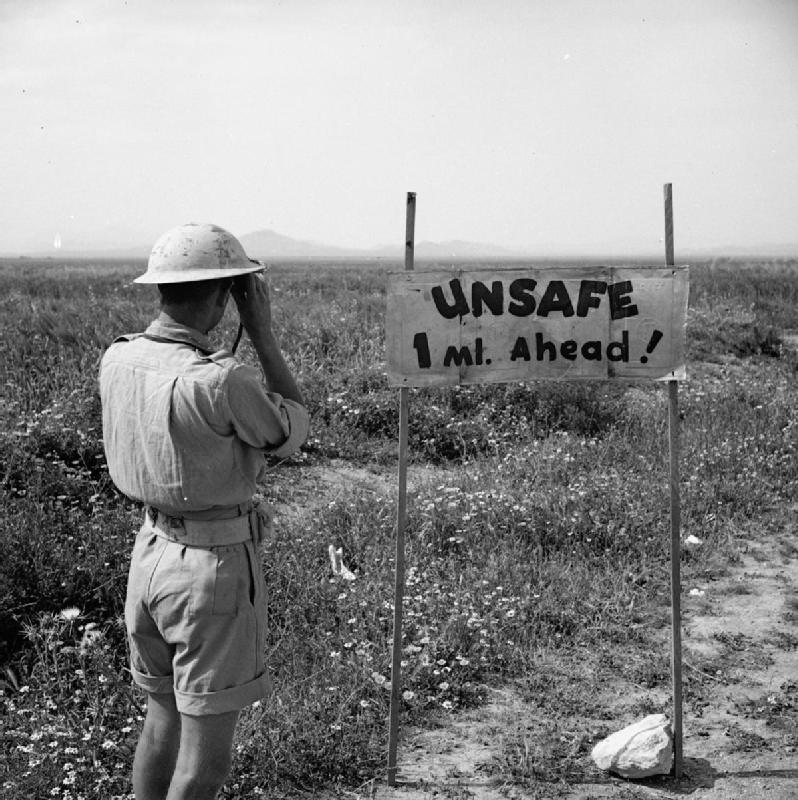
- Tunisia Front - Eighth Army at Enfidaville (Part of 18th Army Group)
- Active: February 20, 1943 to May 15, 1943
- Allegiance: United Kingdom
- Branch: British Army
- Type: Army group
- Role: Army Group Headquarters
- Size: 200,000
- Part of: Allied Force Headquarters

Commanders
- Notable commanders: Harold Alexander

The 18th Army Group was an Allied formation in the Second World War. It was formed on 20 February 1943 when British Eighth Army advancing from the east and British First Army advancing into Tunisia from the west came close enough to require coordinated command during the Tunisia Campaign.

== History ==
The 18th Army Group was commanded by General Sir Harold Alexander and came under General Dwight D. Eisenhower, Commander-in-Chief Allied Forces Headquarters (AFHQ).

Its principal formations were the British Eighth Army, under Lieutenant-General Bernard Montgomery and the British First Army under Lieutenant-General Kenneth Anderson. Eighth Army had three British Army corps under its command which contained a variety of forces from the British Empire (including troops from Australia, New Zealand and India) together with Greek, French and Polish contingents. They were British X Corps, British XIII Corps and British XXX Corps. They had fought across virtually the whole North African shore to the east of Tunisia after winning a victory at the Second Battle of El Alamein in November 1942. First Army had four corps under its command: Two were of British origin (V Corps and IX Corps); the other corps were U.S. II Corps and French XIX Corps. First Army controlled the forces that had landed in Morocco and Algeria in November 1942 in the first of the great Allied amphibious assaults of the war, Operation Torch.

18th Army Group was faced by the Axis Army Group Africa, under Generalfeldmarschall Erwin Rommel, comprising the German 5th Panzer Army under Generaloberst Hans-Jürgen von Arnim, and the Italian the 1st Army under Marshal Giovanni Messe. (Note: Rommel had given the command of the former German-Italian Panzer Army Africa to Messe since February 1943 after the fighting withdrawal from the Western Desert campaign.) The two German commanders disliked each other, and so often strategy was not coordinated.

Both the First Army and Eighth Army had enjoyed very quick initial success in their campaigns after November 1942. Once they reached Tunisia two things halted them. One was overextension of lines of communication and the other was the greater concentration of German troops that the smaller defended area produced. First Army in particular received stinging blows from Rommel at the Battle of Kasserine Pass. Rommel's veteran formations slammed into II Corps and the green American troops did not perform well. It was only after reinforcements of more experienced troops and quantities of artillery had been rushed in that the situation was stabilised.

Following the Kasserine Pass engagement and an Allied consolidation, a fresh attack was launched. First Army led the main attack, with Eighth Army providing support along the eastern coast of Tunisia. That attack lead eventually in May 1943 to the surrender of Axis forces in Africa. 250,000 men were taken prisoner, a number equal to that at Stalingrad on the Eastern Front earlier in the year.

General Alexander sent the message, "We are masters of the North African shore." 18th Army Group was disbanded in Tunisia on 15 May 1943.
