= Operation Compass =

World War II British military operation

- Part of the Western Desert campaign of the Second World War
- Map showing the Western Desert theatre
Date	9 December 1940 – 9 February 1941; (2 months)
Location	Sidi Barrani, Egypt to El Agheila, Libya
Result	British victory
Territorial changes	Recapture of western Egypt and occupation of Cyrenaica

Belligerents
United Kingdom; India; (Cyrenaica) Libyan Arab Force (Note: Formed in 1940 and augmented by prisoners captured at Sidi Barrani to five battalions of infantry. The LAF participated in the first two occupations of Cyrenaica, mostly performing garrison and lines-of-communication duties.); Australia; Free France	Italy; Italian Libya

Commanders and leaders
Archibald Wavell; Henry Wilson; Richard O'Connor; Michael Creagh; Noel Beresford-Peirse; Iven Mackay	Rodolfo Graziani; Giuseppe Tellera †; Sebastiano Gallina (POW); Carlo Spatocco; Annibale Bergonzoli (POW); Enrico Mannella (POW)

Units involved
(United Kingdom) Western Desert Force	(Kingdom of Italy) 10th Army

Strength
36,000 men; 275 tanks; 120 guns; 142 aircraft	150,000 men; 600 armoured vehicles; 1,600 guns; 331 aircraft

Casualties and losses
500 killed; 1,373 wounded; 55 missing; 26 aircraft	5,500+ killed; 10,000 wounded; 133,298 (POW); 420 tanks; 845 guns; 564 aircraft

Operation Compass (also Italian: Battaglia della Marmarica) was the first large British military operation of the Western Desert Campaign (1940–1943) during the Second World War. British metropolitan, Imperial and Commonwealth forces attacked the Italian and Libyan forces of the 10th Army (Marshal Rodolfo Graziani) in western Egypt and Cyrenaica, the eastern province of Libya, from December 1940 to February 1941.

The Western Desert Force (WDF) (Lieutenant-General Richard O'Connor) with about 36,000 men, advanced from Mersa Matruh in Egypt on a five-day raid against the Italian positions of the 10th Army, which had about 150,000 troops in fortified posts around Sidi Barrani in Egypt and in Cyrenaica to the west. The WDF swiftly defeated the Italians in their fortified posts and at Sidi Barrani, forced the rest of the 10th Army out of Egypt and captured the ports along the Cyrenaican coast in Libya. The 10th Army was cut off as it retreated towards Tripolitania at the Battle of Beda Fomm, the remnants being pursued to El Agheila on the Gulf of Sirte.

The British took over 138,000 Italian and Libyan prisoners, hundreds of tanks, more than a thousand guns and many aircraft. The WDF suffered casualties of 1,900 men killed and wounded, about 10 per cent of the infantry. The WDF was unable to continue beyond El Agheila, due to worn-out vehicles and the diversion in March 1941 of the best-equipped units to conduct Operation Lustre for the Battle of Greece. The Italians rushed reinforcements to Libya to defend Tripoli, assisted by the Deutsches Afrikakorps and the Luftwaffe.

== Background ==
=== 10th Army ===
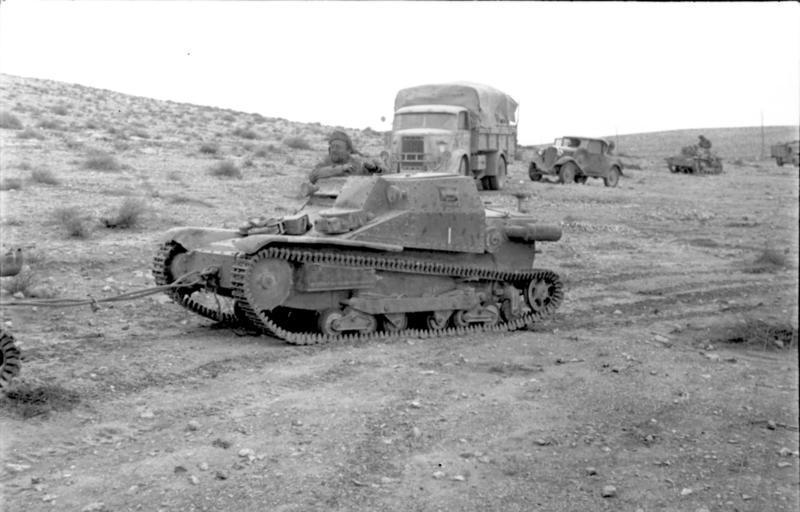
Italian L3/33 tankettes in North Africa, April 1941.

When war was declared, the 5th Army (General Italo Gariboldi) was in Tripolitania the western Libyan province and the 10th Army (General Mario Berti) was in Cyrenaica to the east. Once the French in Tunisia no longer posed a threat to Tripolitania, units of the 5th Army were used to reinforce the 10th Army. When the Governor-General of Libya, Italo Balbo, was killed by friendly fire, Marshal Rodolfo Graziani took his place. Graziani expressed doubts about the ability of the large non-mechanised Italian force to defeat the British, who, though fewer in numbers, were motorised. After being reinforced from the 5th Army, the 10th Army controlled the equivalent of four corps with 150,000 infantry, 1,600 guns, 600 tankettes and tanks and 331 aircraft. The XX Corps comprised the 60th Infantry Division "Sabratha" and the XXI Corps was composed of the 1st CC.NN. Division "23 Marzo", the 2nd CC.NN. Division "28 Ottobre" and the 63rd Infantry Division "Cirene". XXII Corps had the 61st Infantry Division "Sirte" and XXIII Corps had the 4th CC.NN. Division "3 Gennaio" and the 64th Infantry Division "Catanzaro".

The new Libyan Divisions Group (Gruppo Divisioni Libiche) had the part-motorised and lightly armoured Maletti Group (General Pietro Maletti), the 1st Libyan Division (Major-General Luigi Sibille) and the 2nd Libyan Division (Major-General Armando Pescatori). The Maletti Group had been formed at Derna on 8 July 1940 comprising seven Libyan motorised infantry battalions, a company of Fiat M11/39 tanks, a company of L3/33 tankettes, motorised artillery and supply units, as the main motorised unit of the 10th Army. On 29 August, as more tanks arrived from Italy, the (Libyan Tank Command [Colonel Valentini]) was formed with three groups: 1st Tank Group (Colonel Aresca) with the I Tank Battalion "M" and the XXI, LXI, and LXII Tank battalion "L", 2nd Tank Group (Colonel Antonio Trivioli), with the II Tank Battalion "M", less one company and the IX, XX, and LXI Tank Battalion "L"s and Maletti Group with one company from the LX Tank Battalion "L", one company from the II Tank Battalion "M", and three Libyan infantry battalions. Raggruppamento Maletti became part of the Regio Corpo Truppe Coloniali della Libia (Royal Corps of Libyan Colonial Troops), with the 1st Libyan Division and the 2nd Libyan Division.

=== Western Desert Force ===
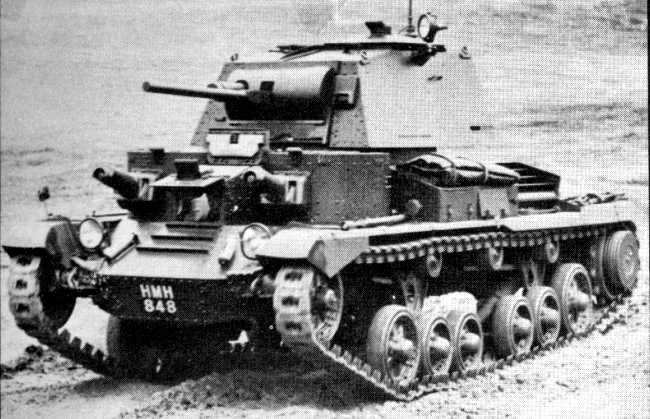
Cruiser Tank Mk I (A9)

Middle East Command (General Archibald Wavell) had about 36,000 soldiers, some outside Egypt, 120 guns and 275 tanks. The RAF had 162 aircraft composed of two squadrons of Hurricanes, one of Gloster Gladiators, three of Bristol Blenheims, three of Vickers Wellingtons and one of Bristol Bombays, about 46 fighters and 116 bombers. The Western Desert Force (WDF) was commanded by Lieutenant-General Richard O'Connor with the 4th Indian Infantry Division (Major-General Noel Beresford-Peirse) and the 7th Armoured Division (Major-General Sir Michael O'Moore Creagh). From 14 December, troops of the 6th Australian Infantry Division (Major-General Iven Giffard Mackay), replaced the 4th Indian Division, which was sent to East Africa, less one brigade. The British had some fast Cruiser Mk I, Cruiser Mk II and Cruiser Mk III tanks with Ordnance QF 2-pounder guns, which were superior to Fiat M11/39 tanks. The British also had a battalion of Matilda II infantry tanks that while slow, were also equipped with the 2-pounder; the armour of the Matildas could not be penetrated by Italian anti-tank guns or field guns.

=== Border skirmishes ===
Area of operations December 1940 to February 1941 (enlargeable)

Italy declared war on Britain and France on 10 June 1940. During the next few months there were raids and skirmishes between Italian forces in Libya and British and Commonwealth forces in Egypt. On 12 June 1940, the Mediterranean Fleet bombarded Tobruk. The force included the cruisers HMS Liverpool and HMS Gloucester and exchanged fire with the Italian cruiser San Giorgio. Royal Air Force Blenheim bombers from 45, 55 and 211 squadrons, hit San Giorgio with one bomb. On 19 June, the British submarine HMS Parthian fired two torpedoes at San Giorgio but missed. The gunners on San Giorgio then supported the local land-based anti-aircraft units and claimed 47 British aircraft shot down or damaged. The naval gunners also shot down a Savoia-Marchetti SM.79 aircraft and killed Italo Balbo, the Governor-General of Libya and Commander-in-chief of Italian forces in North Africa.

== Prelude ==
=== Operazione E ===
Operation Compass (enlargeable)

On 13 September 1940, the Italian 10th Army advanced into Egypt in Operazione E. As the Italians advanced, the small British force at Sollum withdrew to the main defensive position east of Mersa Matruh. The Italian advance was harassed by the 3rd Coldstream Guards, attached artillery and other units. After recapturing Fort Capuzzo, the Italians advanced approximately 59 mi (95 km) in three days and on 16 September, the advance stopped at Maktila, 9.9 mi (16 km) beyond Sidi Barrani. The Italians dug in and awaited reinforcements and supplies along the Via della Vittoria, an extension of the Litoranea Balbo (Via Balbia) being built from the frontier. Five fortified camps were built around Sidi Barrani from Maktila, 15 mi (24 km) east along the coast, south to Tummar East, Tummar West and Nibeiwa; another camp was built at Sofafi on the escarpment to the south-west.

=== British plan ===
Following the Italian advance, Wavell ordered the commander of British Troops Egypt, Lieutenant-General Sir Henry Maitland Wilson, to plan a limited operation to push the Italians back. Operation Compass, for administrative reasons, was originally planned as a five-day raid but consideration was given to continuing the operation to exploit success. On 28 November, Wavell wrote to Wilson that,

I do not entertain extravagant hopes of this operation but I do wish to make certain that if a big opportunity occurs we are prepared morally, mentally and administratively to use it to the fullest.

The 7th Support Group was to observe the Italian camps on the escarpment around Sofafi, to prevent the garrisons from interfering, while the rest of the division and 4th Indian Division passed through the Sofafi–Nibeiwa gap. An Indian brigade and Infantry tanks of 7th Royal Tank Regiment (7th RTR) would attack Nibeiwa from the west, as the 7th Armoured Division protected their northern flank. Once Nibeiwa was captured, a second Indian brigade and the 7th RTR would attack the Tummars. Selby Force (3rd Battalion Coldstream Guards plus some artillery) from the Matruh garrison was to contain the enemy camp at Maktila on the coast and the Royal Navy would bombard Maktila and Sidi Barrani. Preparations were kept secret and only a few officers knew during the training exercise held from 25 to 26 November, that the objectives marked out near Matruh were replicas of Nibeiwa and Tummar; the troops were also told that a second exercise was to follow and did not know that the operation was real until 7 December, as they arrived at their jumping-off points.

Late on 8 December, an Italian reconnaissance aircrew reported that attack on Maktila and Nibeiwa was imminent but Maletti was not informed. On 9 December, the 1st Libyan Division was at Maktila and the 2nd Libyan Division was at Tummar. The Maletti Group was at Nibiewa and the 4th CC.NN. Division "3 Gennaio" and the headquarters of the Libyan Corps were at Sidi Barrani. The 63rd Infantry Division "Cirene" and the headquarters of XXI Corps were at Sofafi and the 64th Infantry Division "Catanzaro" was at Buq Buq. The HQ of XXIII Corps and the 2nd CC.NN. Division "28 Ottobre", were in Sollum and Halfaya Pass respectively and the 62nd Infantry Division "Marmarica" was at Sidi Omar, south of Sollum. Berti was on sick leave and Gariboldi, the 1st CC.NN. Division "23 Marzo" and the 10th Army Headquarters were far back at Bardia. (By the time Berti arrived in Libya, so had the British.) Operation Compass (la battaglia della Marmarica / Battle of the Marmarica) began on the night of 7/8 December. The WDF, with the 7th Armoured Division, 4th Indian Division and the 16th Infantry Brigade advanced 70 mi (113 km) to their start line. The RAF made attacks on Italian airfields and destroyed or damaged 29 aircraft on the ground. Selby Force (Brigadier A. R. Selby) with 1,800 men (the maximum for whom transport could be found), moved up from Matruh, set up a brigade of dummy tanks in the desert and reached a position south-east of Maktila by dawn on 9 December. Maktila had been bombarded by the monitor HMS Terror and the gunboat HMS Aphis; Sidi Barrani had been bombarded by the gunboat HMS Ladybird.

== Battle of the Camps ==
=== Nibeiwa ===
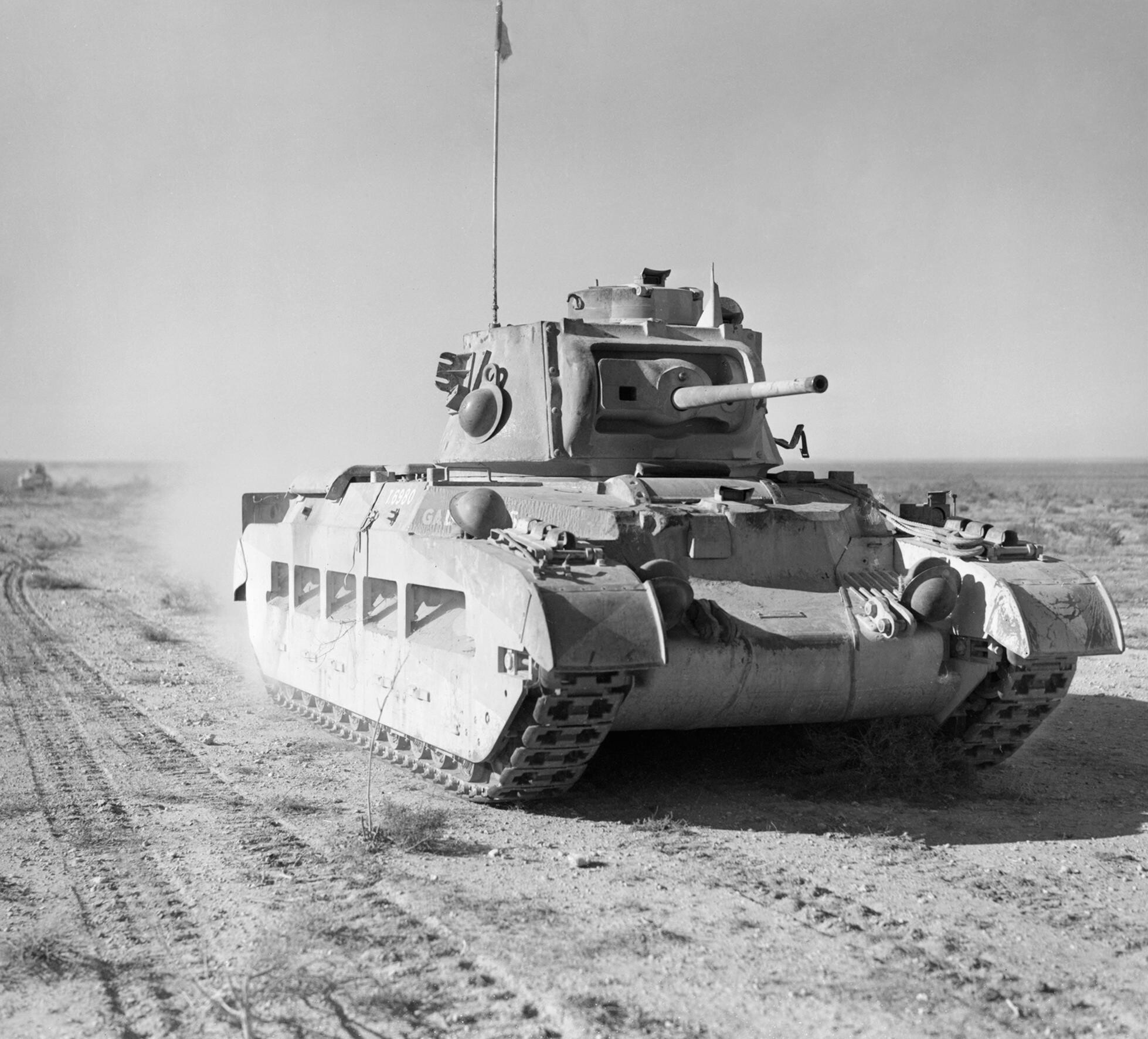
A Matilda tank of the 7th Royal Tank Regiment in the Western Desert.

At 5:00 a.m. on 9 December, a detachment of artillery commenced diversionary fire from the east on the fortified camp at Nibeiwa for an hour, which was held by the Maletti Group and at 7:15 a.m. the divisional artillery began a preliminary bombardment. The 11th Indian Infantry Brigade, with 7th RTR under command, attacked Nibeiwa from the north-west, which reconnaissance had established as the weakest sector. By 8:30 a.m., Nibeiwa had been captured; Maletti had been killed in the fighting along with 818 men, 1,338 were wounded; 2,000 Italian and Libyan soldiers were taken prisoner. Large quantities of supplies were captured for British casualties of 56 men.

=== The Tummars ===
The attack on Tummar West began at 1:50 p.m., after the 7th RTR had refuelled and artillery had bombarded the defences for an hour. Another approach from the north-west was made and tanks broke through the perimeter, followed twenty minutes later by the infantry. The defenders held out for longer than the Nibeiwa garrison but by 4:00 p.m. Tummar West was overrun except for the north-eastern corner. The tanks moved on to Tummar East, the greater part of which was captured by nightfall. The 4th Armoured Brigade had advanced to Azziziya, where the garrison of 400 men surrendered and light patrols of the 7th Hussars pushed forward to cut the road from Sidi Barrani to Buq Buq, while armoured cars of the 11th Hussars ranged further west. The tanks of 7th Armoured Brigade were held in reserve ready to intercept an Italian counter-attack. The 2nd Libyan Division suffered 26 officers and 1,327 men killed, 32 officers and 804 men wounded, with the survivors being taken prisoner.

=== Maktila ===
Unaware of the situation at the Tummars, Selby sent units to cut the western exits from Maktila but the 1st Libyan Division filtered through and escaped. Selby Force followed up the retreat as the 1st Libyan Division moved the 15 mi (24 km) from Maktila to Sidi Barrani and drove part of the column into sand dunes north of the coast road. Cruiser tanks of the 6th Royal Tank Regiment (6th RTR) arrived in a sandstorm and overran the Italians in the dunes at about 5:15 p.m., then joined Selby Force to continue the pursuit. The Italian defenders were caught at Sidi Barrani, in a pocket 10 by 5 mi (16.1 by 8.0 km) backing on to the sea. When the British attacked again at dawn on 11 December, mass surrenders began everywhere, except at Point 90 where troops of the 2nd Libyan Division held out for a short time, after which 2,000 troops surrendered.

=== Sidi Barrani, Buq Buq and Sofafi ===
On 10 December, the 16th Infantry Brigade was brought forward from 4th Indian Division reserve and with part of the 11th Indian Brigade under command, advanced in lorries to attack Sidi Barrani. While moving across exposed ground, some casualties were incurred but with support from artillery and the 7th RTR, it was in position barring the south and south western exits to Sidi Barrani by 1:30 p.m. The British attacked at 4:00 p.m. supported by the divisional artillery and the town fell by nightfall; the remains of the two Libyan Divisions and the 4th CC.NN. Division "3 Gennaio" were trapped between the 16th Infantry Brigade and Selby Force. On 11 December, Selby Force and some tanks attacked and overran the 1st Libyan Division and by the evening, the 4th CC.NN Division "3 Gennaio" had also surrendered. On 11 December, the 7th Armoured Brigade was ordered out of reserve to relieve the 4th Armoured Brigade in the Buq Buq area, mop up and capture large numbers of men and guns. A patrol from the 7th Support Group entered Rabia and found it empty; the 63rd Infantry Division "Cirene" had withdrawn from Rabia and Sofafi overnight. An order to the 4th Armoured Brigade to cut them off west of Sofafi arrived too late and the Italians were able to retire along the escarpment and join Italian forces at Halfaya. Italian casualties were 2,184 men killed, 2,287 troops wounded and 38,000 prisoners.

=== Exploitation ===
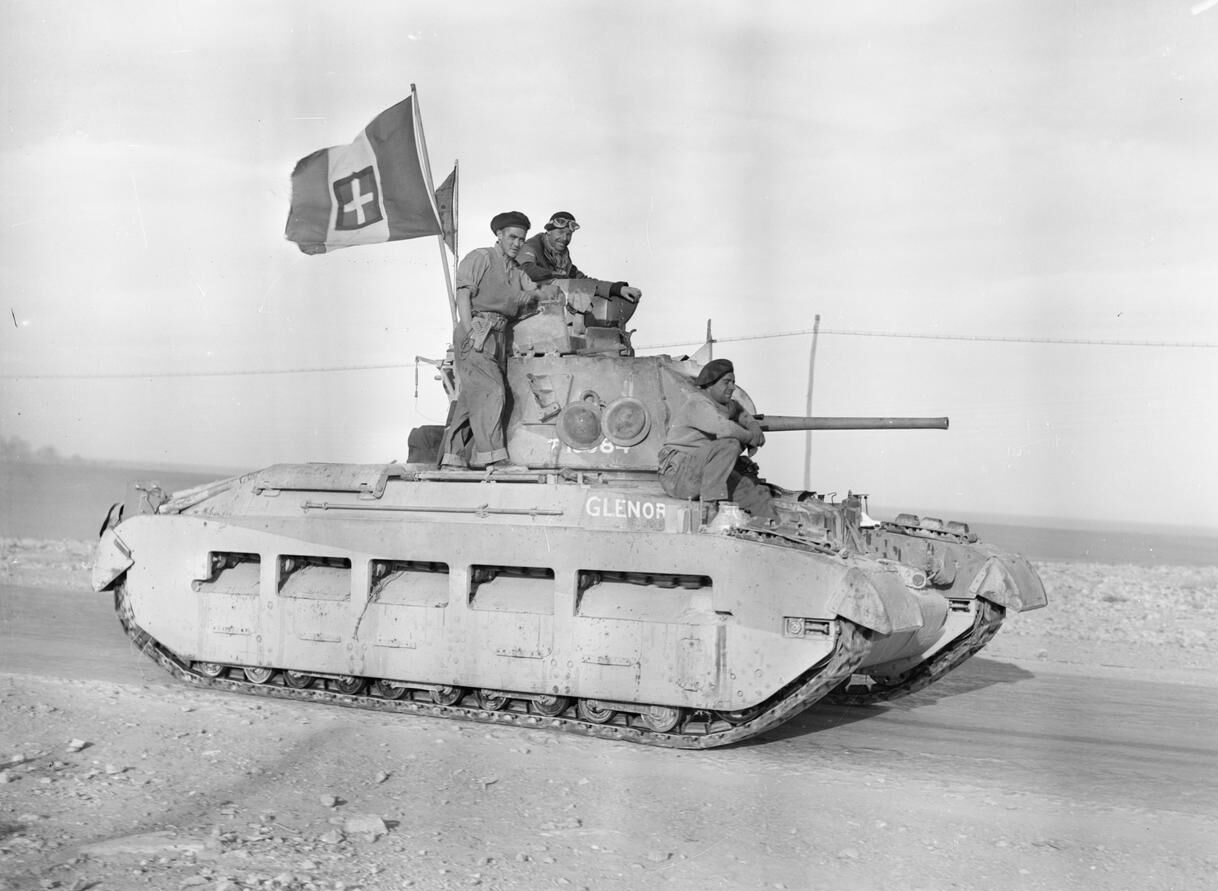
Matilda tank with crew displaying a captured Italian flag

Over the next few days the 4th Armoured Brigade, on top of the escarpment and the 7th Armoured Brigade on the coast, attempted a pursuit but supply problems and the large number of prisoners (twenty times the number planned for) impeded the advance. Italian forces crowded along the coast road and retreating from Sidi Barrani and Buq Buq, were bombarded by Terror and the two gunboats, which fired on the Sollum area all day and most of the night of 11 December. Late on 12 December, the only Italian positions left in Egypt were the approaches to Sollum and the area of Sidi Omar.

The Italians had lost 38,289 Italian and Libyan casualties, most taken prisoner, 73 tanks and 237 guns, against 634 British casualties. The WDF paused to reorganise and then moved quickly west along the Via della Vittoria, through Halfaya Pass and re-captured Fort Capuzzo in Libya. On 7 December, Wellington bombers from Malta and Blenheim bombers from Egypt carried out raids on the Italian air bases at Castel Benito, Benina and El Adem, the attack on Castel Benito being particularly successful, with hits on five hangars and strafing runs which hit many Italian aircraft; the attacks continued until the end of the year.

== Pursuit ==
=== Sollum, Halfaya and Fort Capuzzo ===
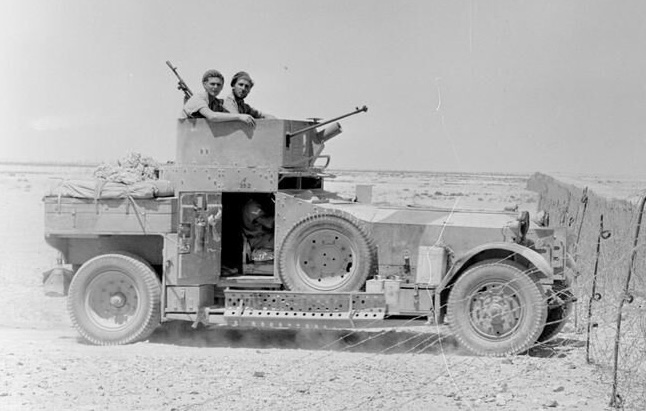
A 1924 Rolls-Royce Armoured Car with modified turret, in the Bardia area of the Western Desert, 1940.

Exploitation continued by the two armoured brigades and the 7th Support Group, with the infantry of 16th Infantry Brigade (which had been detached from the 4th Indian Division) following up. By 15 December, Sollum and the Halfaya Pass had been captured and the British by-passed Italian garrisons further south in the desert. Fort Capuzzo, 40 mi (64 km) inland at the end of the frontier wire, was captured en passant by 7th Armoured Division in December 1940, as it advanced westwards to Bardia. The 7th Armoured Division concentrated south-west of Bardia, waiting for the arrival of 6th Australian Division. By this time the WDF had taken 38,300 prisoners and captured 237 guns and 73 tanks, while suffering casualties of 133 killed, 387 wounded and eight missing.

=== Bardia ===
The 6th Australian Division (Major General Iven Mackay) attacked the Italian XXIII Corps (Lieutenant-General [Generale di Corpo d'Armata] Annibale Bergonzoli) at Bardia from 3 to 5 January 1941, assisted by air support, naval gunfire and artillery. The 16th Australian Infantry Brigade attacked at dawn from the west, where the defences were known to be weak. Sappers blew gaps in the barbed wire with Bangalore torpedoes, then filled in and broke down the sides of the anti-tank ditch with picks and shovels. The Australian infantry and 23 Matilda II tanks of the 7th RTR, overran the Italian defences and took 8,000 prisoners. The 17th Australian Infantry Brigade exploited the breach made in the perimeter and pressed south, as far as a secondary line of defences known as the Switch Line. On the second day, the 16th Australian Infantry Brigade captured Bardia, cutting the fortress in two. Thousands of prisoners were taken and the remnants of the Italian garrison held only the northern and southernmost parts of the fortress. On the third day, the 19th Australian Infantry Brigade advanced south from Bardia, supported by artillery and the remaining six Matilda tanks. The 17th Australian Infantry Brigade attacked and the two brigades reduced the southern sector of the fortress. The Italian garrisons in the north surrendered to the 16th Australian Infantry Brigade and the 7th Support Group outside the fortress; about 25,000 prisoners were taken, along with 400 guns, 130 light and medium tanks and hundreds of motor vehicles. Italian casualties also included 1,703 killed and 3,740 men wounded.

=== Capture of Tobruk ===
On 6 January XIII corps surrounded Tobruk, defended by XXII Corps (Enrico Mannella). After blockading the fort for a fortnight, on the night of 20/21 January, British ships led by Terror (Captain Hector Waller), bombarded Tobruk. Further out, destroyers set a trap for San Giorgio in case it tried to break out but the ship was kept in the port. On the morning of 21 January between 5:00 a.m. and 7:00 a.m. the British artillery bombarded the town. At 7:00 a.m. the 2/3rd Australian Battalion attacked, quickly created a breach in the Italian defences and by the evening had captured half of Tobruk, On 22 January the naval command surrendered and by 4.00 p.m. Generale Vincenzo Della Mura the garrison commander had also surrendered after Mannella had been captured earlier in the day.

=== Derna–Mechili ===
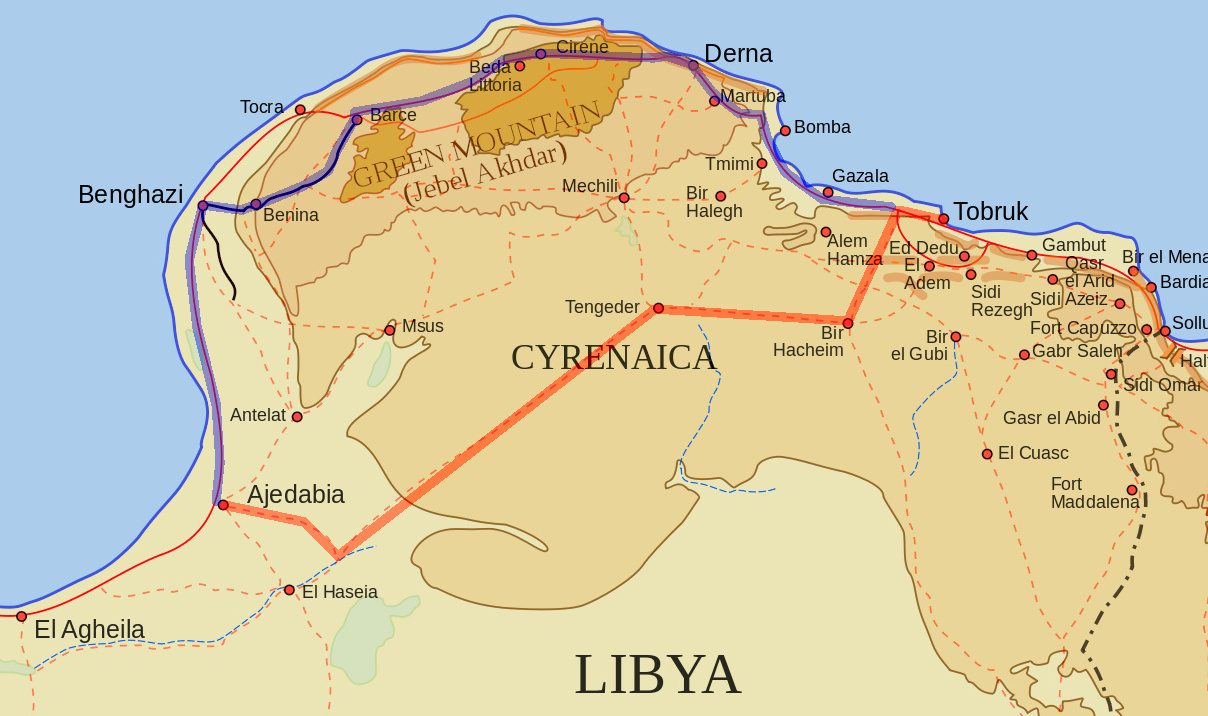
Tobruk–Agedabia, 1940–1941

The area east of the Jebel Akhdar mountains was garrisoned by XX Corps (Lieutenant-General Annibale Bergonzoli) with the 60th Infantry Division "Sabratha" and the Babini Group, which had 120 tanks. The tank force included 82 new M.13/40 tanks, which needed ten days to be made battle-worthy but had been rushed forward anyway. The Sabratha Division held a line from Derna, along Wadi Derna to Mechili, with the Babini Group at Mechili, Giovanni Berta and Chaulan, guarding the flank and rear of the infantry. On 23 January, the 10th Army commander, General Giuseppe Tellera ordered a counter-attack against the British, to avoid an envelopment of XX Corps from the south. Next day, the Babini Group, with ten to fifteen of the new M.13/40s, attacked the 7th Hussars as they headed west to cut the Derna–Mechili track north of Mechili. The British swiftly retired, calling for help from the 2nd RTR, which complacently ignored the signals. The British lost several tanks and knocked out two M.13s, until eventually, the 2nd RTR mobilised, caught the Italian tanks sky-lined on a ridge and knocked out seven M.13s, for the loss of a cruiser and six light tanks.

To the north, the 2/11th Australian Battalion engaged the Sabratha Division and Bersaglieri companies of the Babini Group at Derna airfield, making slow progress against determined resistance. The 19th Australian Brigade began to arrive in the morning and Italian bombers and fighters attacked the Australians. The Italians swept the flat ground with field artillery and machine-guns, stopping the Australian advance 3,000 yd (1.7 mi; 2.7 km) short of the objective. On 26 January, the 2/4th Australian Battalion cut the Derna–Mechili road and a company crossed Wadi Derna during the night against bold Italian counter-attacks. The Italians disengaged on the night of 28/29 January, before the garrison was trapped and rearguards of the Babini Group cratered roads, planted mines and booby-traps and managed to conduct several skilful ambushes, which slowed the British pursuit. Derna was occupied unopposed on 29 January and the Australians began a pursuit along the Via Balbia, closing on Giovanni Berta during 31 January.

=== Battle of Beda Fomm ===
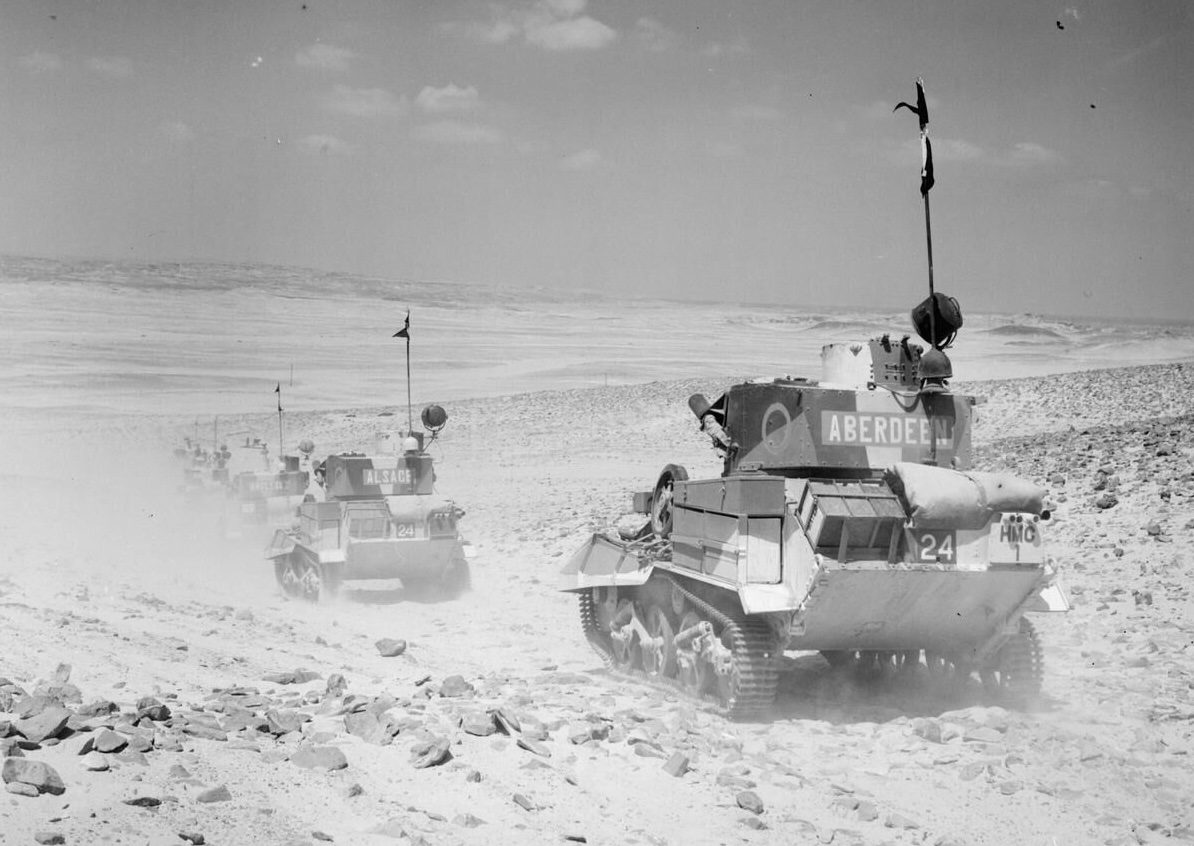
British Light Tanks Mk VI on patrol, 2 August 1940

In late January, the British learned that the Italians were retreating along the Litoranea Balbo (Via Balbia) from Benghazi. The 7th Armoured Division was dispatched to intercept the remnants of the 10th Army by moving through the desert, south of the Jebel Akhdar (Green Mountain) via Msus and Antelat, as the 6th Australian Division pursued the Italians along the coast road, north of the jebel. The terrain slowed the British tanks and Combe Force (Lieutenant-Colonel John Combe), a flying column of wheeled vehicles, was sent ahead across the chord of the jebel. Late on 5 February, Combe Force arrived at the Via Balbia south of Benghazi and set up road blocks near Sidi Saleh, about 20 mi (32 km) north of Ajedabia and 30 mi (48 km) south-west of Antelat; the leading elements of the 10th Army arrived thirty minutes later. Next day, the Italians attacked to break through the roadblock and continued to attack into 7 February. With British reinforcements arriving and the Australians pressing down the road from Benghazi, the remnants of the 10th Army surrendered. From Benghazi to Agedabia, the British took 25,000 prisoners, captured 107 tanks and 93 guns.

== Desert operations ==
=== Giarabub, Kufra and Uweinat ===
Italian garrisons held Giarabub 150 mi (240 km) south of Sollum, Kufra Oasis, Jalo at the west end of the Great Sand Sea and Murzuk, 500 mi (800 km) south of Tripoli. The oasis of Giarabub was attacked in January 1941 and captured in March by the 6th Australian Cavalry Regiment and an Australian infantry battalion. Further south, on the far side of the Sand Sea, the oasis of Kufra was attacked by Free French from French Equatorial Africa, in concert with Long Range Desert Group (LRDG) patrols. Kufra fell after the Capture of Kufra in March 1941. Further west, on the border with Chad, the Italian base at Murzuk was raided in January, when a patrol of the new Long Range Patrol Unit and a local sheikh travelled 1,300 mi (2,100 km) to rendezvous near Kayugi with a small Free French detachment. (Note: Cairo to Bahariya Oasis, Ain Dalla, Two Hills/Big Cairn, Murzuk, Traghen, Tummo, Zouar, Faya, Tekro, Sarra, Bishara, Jebel Sherif, Sarra, via Jebel Uweinat to the Nile and Cairo.) The force attacked Murzuk and destroyed three aircraft and a hangar; the French commander was killed, most of the Italians surrendered and several prisoners were taken. The raiders then shot up three forts and departed.

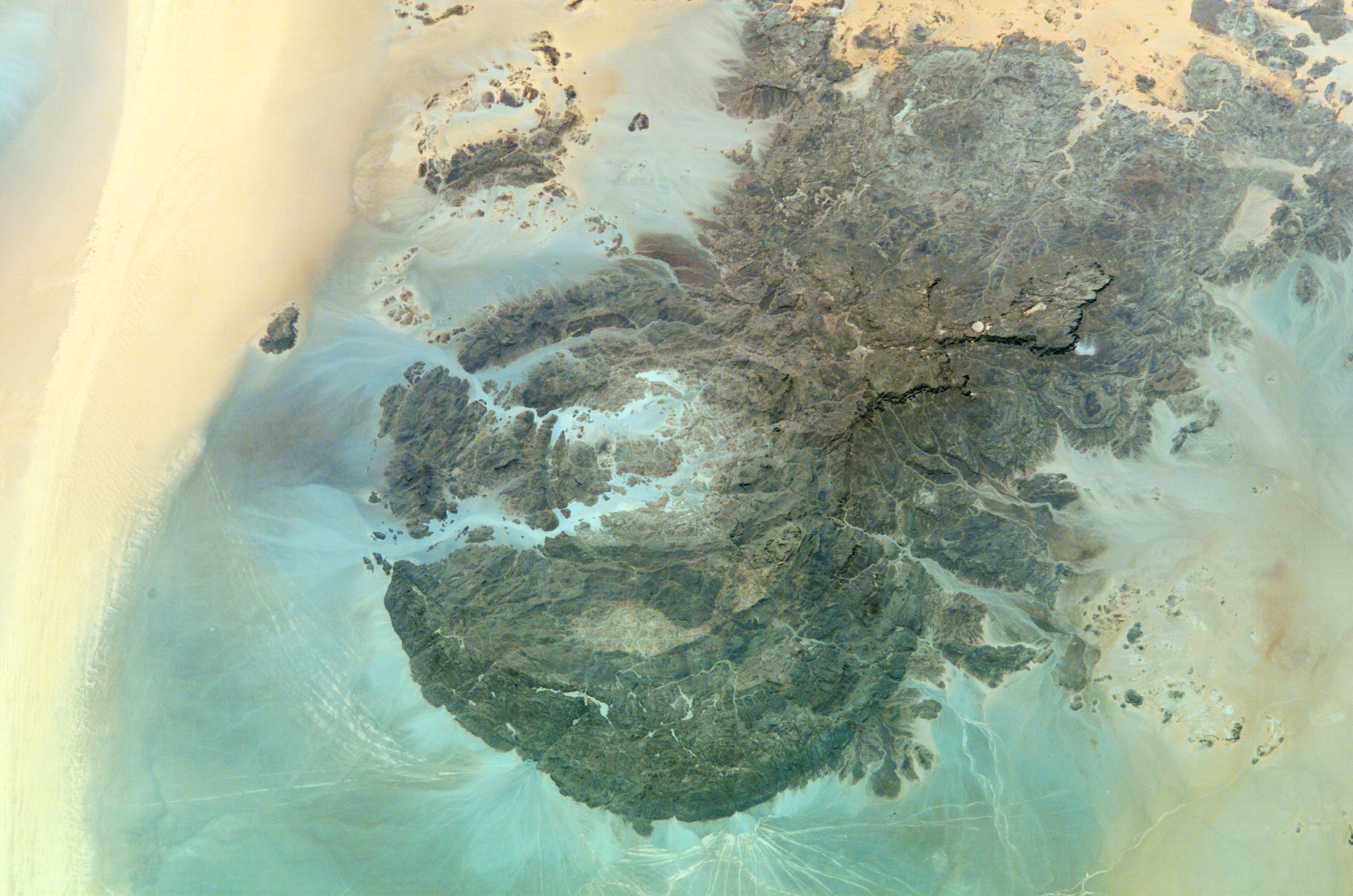
Jebel Uweinat

At Jebel Uweinat, a 6,000 ft (1,800 m) massif 600 mi (970 km) inland, at the junctions of Egypt, Libya and Sudan, were landing grounds with an Italian garrison. The base was the closest Italian outpost to Italian East Africa (Africa Orientale Italiana) and an Italian raid from Uweinat on Wadi Halfa in Sudan was possible. Destruction of the dockyards and railway workshops and the sinking of vessels on the Nile could cut the communications between Khartoum and Cairo. British patrols visited Faya and rendezvoused with another French detachment with General Philippe Leclerc for an attack on Kufra. The British were strafed by aircraft and ambushed by armoured cars of an Italian Auto-Saharan Company (Auto-Avio-Sahariane), which destroyed several lorries. Leclerc decided that an attack on Kufra was not possible and the remaining British returned to Cairo, after a 45-day journey of 4,300 mi (6,900 km). Kufra was captured by the French on 1 March and became the new LRDG base in April.

== Aftermath ==
=== Analysis ===
Approximate numbers of PoW and equipment captured, Western Desert and Cyrenaica (9 December 1940 – 8 February 1941)
Place	PoW	Tanks	Guns
Sidi; Barrani	38,289	73	297
Sidi Omar	900	0	8
Bardia	42,000	130	275
Tobruk	25,000	87	208
Mechili	100	13	0
Derna; Benghazi	2,000	10	24
Benghazi; Agedabia	25,000	107	93
Total	133,298	420	845

The success of the 7th Armoured Division encouraged a belief in the Royal Tank Regiment that manoeuvre could win battles; the engagement with the Babini Group on 24 January, led to a conclusion that armoured divisions needed more artillery. No integration of tanks with infantry or the use of anti-tank guns offensively was considered necessary. The lack of cover in the desert encouraged dispersion to avoid air attack but this reduced firepower at the decisive point. Due to the lack of supplies and the shortage of transport, conservation during lulls also encouraged the use of "jock columns" (a small mobile force formed of a motorised infantry company, a field-gun battery and several armoured cars). The success of such columns against the Italians led to exaggerated expectations, which were confounded when German aircraft and better-equipped and -armed troops arrived in Libya. The 7th Armoured Division concluded that the defensive mentality of the Italians had justified the British taking of exceptional risks, which would be unjustified against German troops.

=== Casualties ===
The WDF suffered casualties of 500 killed, 55 missing, and 1,373 wounded. The RAF lost 26 aircraft, comprising six Hurricane and five Gladiator fighters, three Wellington bombers, a Vickers Valentia bomber/transport and eleven Blenheim light bombers. A far larger number of aircraft became non-operational due to damage, which could not be repaired quickly for lack of spare parts, a problem made worse by the increased use of explosive bullets by the Italians. (On 14 December, a raid on Bardia by nine Blenheims cost one aircraft shot down and seven damaged by explosive bullets.) The Italian 10th Army lost at least 5,500 men killed, about 10,000 wounded, 133,298 men taken prisoner and losses of 420 tanks and 845 guns.

=== Subsequent operations ===
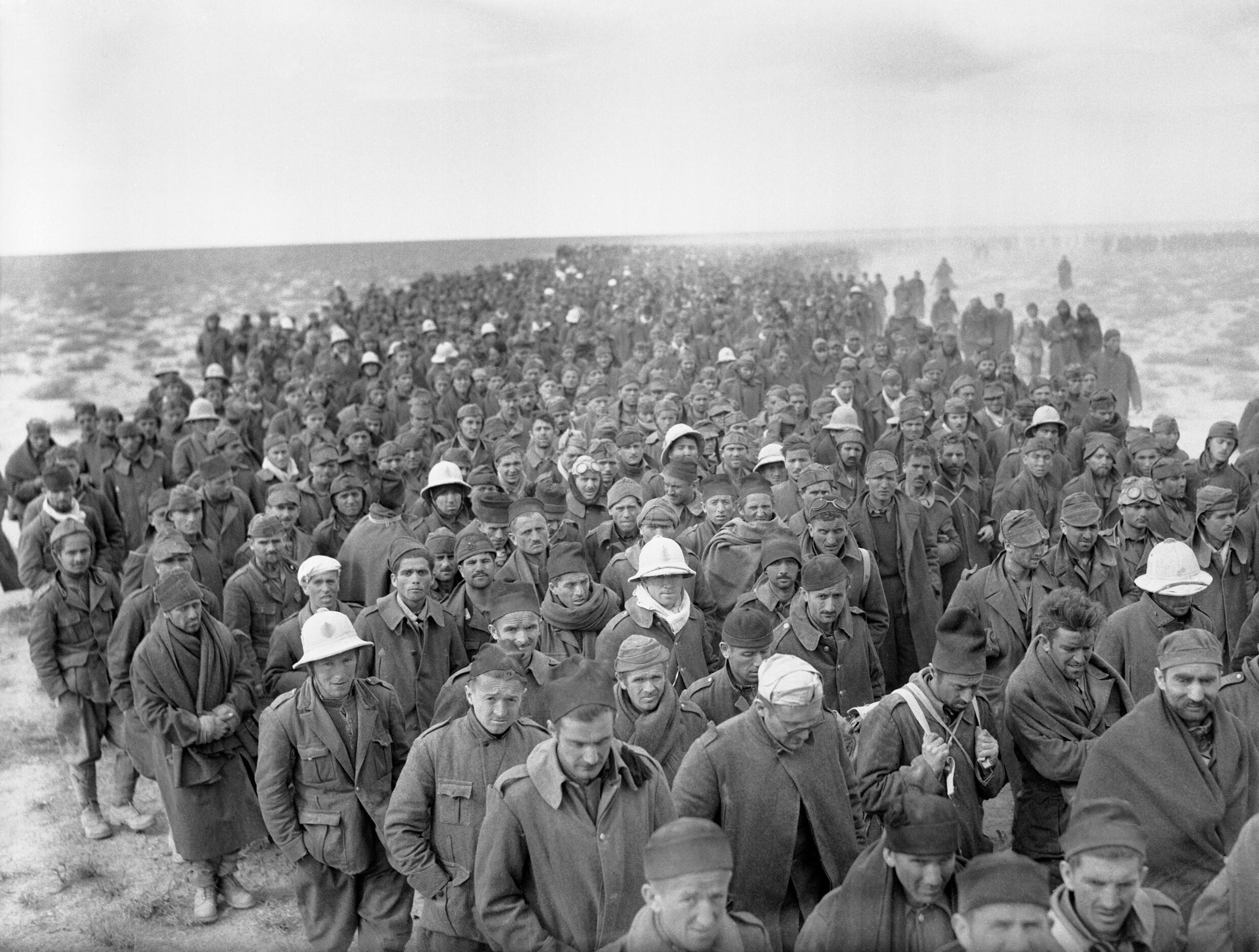
Italian and Libyan troops going into captivity

A week after the Italian surrender at Beda Fomm, the Defence Committee in London ordered Cyrenaica to be held with the minimum of forces and the surplus sent to Greece. In XIII Corps (formerly the WDF) the 6th Australian Division was fully equipped and had few losses to replace. The 7th Armoured Division had been operating for eight months, wearing out its mechanical equipment and was withdrawn to refit. Two regiments of the 2nd Armoured Division were also worn out, leaving the division with only four tank regiments. The 6th Australian Division went to Greece in March, with a brigade group of the 2nd Armoured Division containing the best equipment. The remainder of the division and the new 9th Australian Division, minus two of its three brigades and most of its transport, sent to Greece, had two under-equipped brigades of the 7th Australian Division attached. The division took over in Cyrenaica, on the assumption that the Italians could not begin a counter-offensive until May, even with German reinforcements.

The 3rd Armoured Brigade of the 2nd Armoured Division was left in Cyrenaica comprising an under-strength light tank regiment, a second regiment using captured Italian tanks and from mid-March a cruiser tank regiment, also equipped with worn-out tanks. The 2nd Support Group had only one motor battalion, a field artillery regiment, one anti-tank battery and a machine-gun company; most of the divisional transport had been sent to Greece. A few thousand men of the 10th Army escaped the disaster in Cyrenaica but the 5th Army in Tripolitania had four divisions. The Sirte, Tmed Hassan and Buerat strongholds were reinforced from Italy, which brought the Italian armies up to about 150,000 men. German reinforcements were sent to Libya to form a blocking detachment (Sperrverband) under Directive 22 (11 January), these being the first units of the Afrika Korps (Generalleutnant Erwin Rommel). On 25 March 1941, Graziani was replaced by Gariboldi.

== Orders of battle ==
=== 10th Army ===
December 1940, detail taken from Montanari (1990) unless specified.

- Supreme Commander Italian Forces in North Africa, Marshal Rodolfo Graziani
- 10th Army, General Italo Gariboldi, from 23 December General Giuseppe Tellera (Killed in action [KIA] 7 February 1941)

==== Libyan Divisions Group ====
- Libyan Divisions Group, headquarters in Sidi Barrani General Sebastiano Gallina
  - 1st Libyan Division, at Al Maktilah (General Giovanni Cerio)
    - 1st Libyan Infantry Group, 3 × battalions, 1 × anti-tank company, 47/32 mod. 1935 anti-tank guns
    - 2nd Libyan Infantry Group, 3 × battalions, 1 × anti-tank company, 47/32 mod. 1935 anti-tank guns
    - 1st Libyan Artillery Group, 2 × groups 77/28 mod. 5 field guns
    - II Mixed Engineer Battalion
    - Attached units
      - 1 artillery group from the 2nd CC.NN. Division "28 Ottobre", 75/27 mod. 11 field guns
      - 2 × batteries 65/17 mod. 13 mountain guns
      - 1 × battery, 105/28 howitzers
      - 1 × artillery company, 47/32 mod. 1935 anti-tank guns
  - 2nd Libyan Division, between Ras el Dai and Alam el Tummar (General Armando Pescatori)
    - 3rd Libyan Infantry Group, 4 × battalions, 1 × anti-tank company, 47/32 mod. 1935 anti-tank guns
    - 4th Libyan Infantry Group, 4 × battalions, 1 × anti-tank company, 47/32 mod. 1935 anti-tank guns
    - 2nd Libyan Artillery Group, 2 × groups 77/28 mod. 5 field guns
    - I Mixed Engineer Battalion
    - Attached units
      - IX Tank Battalion L, with L3/35 tankettes
      - 1 × group from the 2nd CC.NN. Division "28 Ottobre", 75/27 mod. 11 field guns
      - 1 × group, 105/28 howitzers
      - 2 × batteries 65/17 mod. 13 mountain guns
      - 1 × anti-tank company, 47/32 mod. 1935 anti-tank guns
  - 4th CC.NN. Division "3 Gennaio", in Sidi Barrani (General Fabio Merzari)
    - 228th CC.NN. Legion, 3 × battalions, 1 × battery, 65/17 mod. 13 mountain guns, 1 × company, 81 mm mortars
    - 250th CC.NN. Legion "Indomita", 3 × battalions, 1 × battery, 65/17 mod. 13 mountain guns, 1 × company, 81 mm mortars
    - 204th Artillery Regiment, 2 × groups 75/27 mod. 11 field guns, 1 × group, 100/17 mod. 1914 howitzers
    - IV CC.NN. Machine-Gun Battalion
    - IV CC.NN. Mixed Engineer Battalion
    - 4th CC.NN. Anti-Tank Company, 47/32 mod. 1935 anti-tank guns
    - Attached units
      - 1 × artillery group, 105/28 howitzers
      - 1 × artillery group, 75/27 C.K. anti-aircraft guns

==== XXI Corps ====
- XXI Corps, headquarters in Buq Buq General Carlo Spatocco
  - XX Tank Battalion L, L3/35 tankettes
  - LXIII Tank Battalion L, L3/35 tankettes
  - X Machine Gun Squadrons Group
  - 1 × motorcyclist company
  - 63rd Infantry Division "Cirene", at Alam el Rabia and Bir Bofafi (General Alessandro de Guidi)
    - 157th Infantry Regiment "Cirene", 3 × battalions, 1 × battery, 65/17 mod. 13 mountain guns, 1 × company, 81 mm mortars
    - 158th Infantry Regiment, 3 × battalions, 1 × battery, 65/17 mod. 13 mountain guns, 1 × company, 81 mm mortars
    - 45th Artillery Regiment, 2 × groups 75/27 mod. 11 field guns, 1 × group, 100/17 mod. 1914 howitzers
    - LXIII Machine-Gun Battalion
    - LXIII Mixed Engineer Battalion
    - Attached units
      - I/21st Artillery Group, 105/28 howitzers
      - III/12th Artillery Group, 100/17 mod. 1914 howitzers
      - III/21st Artillery Group, 75/27 mod. 11 field guns
      - 2 × batteries 65/17 mod. 13 mountain guns
      - 202nd CC.NN. Anti-Tank Company, 47/32 mod. 1935 anti-tank guns
  - 64th Infantry Division "Catanzaro", at Alam Salamus (General Giuseppe Amico)
    - 141st Infantry Regiment "Catanzaro", 3 × battalions, 1 × battery, 65/17 mod. 13 mountain guns 1 × company, 81 mm mortars
    - 142nd Infantry Regiment, 3 × battalions, 1 × battery, 65/17 mod. 13 mountain guns 1 × company, 81 mm mortars
    - 203rd Artillery Regiment, 2 × groups 75/27 mod. 11 field guns 1 × group, 100/17 mod. 1914 howitzers
    - LXIV Machine-Gun Battalion
    - LXIV Mixed Engineer Battalion
    - 64th Anti-Tank Company, 47/32 mod. 1935 anti-tank guns
  - Maletti Group, at Alam Nibeiwa and Alam el Iktufa (General Pietro Maletti, KIA 9 December 1940)
    - I, V, XVII, XIX Libyan infantry battalions
    - I Auto-Saharan Battalion
    - II Tank Battalion M11/39, 4th Tank Infantry Regiment 37 × M11/39 tanks
    - 1 × group, 65/17 mod. 13 mountain guns
    - 1 × group, 75/27 mod. 11 field guns
    - 2 × anti-tank companies 47/32 mod. 1935 anti-tank guns
    - 1 × company, 81 mm mortars
    - 1 × battery, 105/28 howitzers

==== XXIII Corps ====
- XXIII Corps, HQ Sollum, General Annibale Bergonzoli
  - 1st CC.NN. Division "23 Marzo", Bardia (General Francesco Antonelli)
    - 219th CC.NN. Legion, 3 × battalions, 1 × battery, 65/17 mod. 13 mountain guns 1 × company, 81 mm mortars
    - 233rd CC.NN. Legion, 3 × battalions, 1 × battery, 65/17 mod. 13 mountain guns 1 × company, 81 mm mortars
    - 201st CC.NN. Artillery Regiment, 2 × groups 75/27 mod. 11 field guns 1 × group, 100/17 mod. 1914 howitzers
    - CCI CC.NN. Machine-Gun Battalion
    - CCI CC.NN. Mixed Engineer Battalion
    - 201st CC.NN. Anti-Tank Company, 47/32 mod. 1935 anti-tank guns
    - Attached units
      - LXI Tank Battalion L, L3/35 tankettes
  - 2nd CC.NN. Division "28 Ottobre", at Sollum and Halfaya Pass (General Francesco Argentino)
    - 231st CC.NN. Legion, 3 × battalions, 1 × battery, 65/17 mod. 13 mountain guns, 1 × company, 81 mm mortars
    - 238th CC.NN. Legion, 3 × battalions, 1 × battery, 65/17 mod. 13 mountain guns 1 × company, 81 mm mortars
    - 202nd CC.NN. Artillery Regiment, 1 × group, 100/17 mod. 1914 howitzers 2 × groups detached
    - CCII CC.NN. Machine-Gun Battalion
    - CCII CC.NN. Mixed Engineer Battalion
  - 62nd Infantry Division "Marmarica", at Sidi Omar and Gabr du Fares (General Ruggero Tracchia)
    - 115th Infantry Regiment, 3 × battalions, 1 × battery, 65/17 mod. 13 mountain guns 1 × company, 81 mm mortars
    - 116th Infantry Regiment, 3 × battalions, 1 × battery, 65/17 mod. 13 mountain guns, 1 × company, 81 mm mortars
    - 44th Artillery Regiment, 2 × groups 75/27 mod. 11 field guns, 1 × group, 100/17 mod. 1914 howitzers
    - LXII Machine-Gun Battalion
    - LXII Mixed Engineer Battalion
    - 62nd Anti-Tank Company, 47/32 mod. 1935 anti-tank guns
    - Attached units:
      - LXII Tank Battalion L, L3/35 tankettes
      - 2 × batteries 65/17 mod. 13 mountain guns
      - 2 × anti-tank companies 47/32 mod. 1935 anti-tank guns

==== XXII Army Corps (Reserve) ====
- XXII Corps, headquarters in Tobruk General Enrico Pitassi Mannella
  - 61st Infantry Division "Sirte", at Gambut (General Vincenzo della Mura)
    - 69th Infantry Regiment, 3 × battalions, 1 × battery, 65/17 mod. 13 mountain guns
    - 70th Infantry Regiment, 3 × battalions, 1 × battery, 65/17 mod. 13 mountain guns
    - 43rd Artillery Regiment, 2 × groups 75/27 mod. 11 field guns, 1 × group, 100/17 mod. 1914 howitzers
    - LXI Mixed Engineer Battalion
    - Attached units in Barce:
      - I Libyan Paratroopers Battalion "Diavoli neri"
      - Libyan National Paratroopers Battalion
  - Artillery Command
    - 10th Army Corps Artillery Regiment
    - 20th Army Corps Artillery Regiment
  - Babini Group at Marsa Lucch (General Valentino Babini)
    - I Tank Battalion M11/39, 4th Tank Infantry Regiment, 37 × M11/39 tanks
    - III Tank Battalion M13/40, 32nd Tank Infantry Regiment, 37 × M13/40 tanks
    - XXI Tank Battalion L, L3/35 tankettes (disbanded at Tobruk late in December 1940, personnel used to raise the XXI Tank Battalion M13/40 at Benghazi in January 1941)
    - LX Tank Battalion L, L3/35 tankettes
    - 1 × Bersaglieri motorcycle battalion
    - 1 × group, 75/27 mod. 11 field guns
    - 1 × group, 100/17 mod. 1914 howitzers

==== Cyrenaica military garrisons ====
- Tobruk
  - Royal Italian Army:
    - XXI Libyan Coastal Battalion
    - 2 × anti-aircraft groups, 20/65 mod. 35 anti-aircraft guns
  - Royal Italian Navy
    - cruiser San Giorgio
    - 10 × coastal batteries
  - Guardia alla Frontiera
    - Infantry: 2,300 men
    - Artillery: 2 × groups
    - Engineers: 2 × mixed engineer units
- Bardia
  - Royal Italian Army:
    - 1 × fortification machine-gun squadrons group
    - 3 × anti-tank companies, 47/32 mod. 1935 anti-tank guns
    - V Coastal Fortification Group
    - XVII Group, 75/27 mod. 11 field guns
    - 2 × batteries 75/27 mod. 11 field guns
  - Guardia alla Frontiera
    - Infantry: 2,500 men
    - Artillery: 17 × batteries
- Giarabub
  - Royal Italian Army
    - 1 × motorised Libyan machine-gun company
    - 1 × fusiliers company
    - 4 × Libyan fortification machine-gun companies
    - 1 × section, 2 × 65/17 mod. 13 mountain guns
    - 1 × platoon, 4 × 20/65 mod. 35 anti-aircraft guns
    - 1/2 × anti-tank company, 6 × 47/32 mod. 1935 anti-tank guns

==== Libyan Sahara garrisons ====
- Kufra Oasis
  - 2 × Libyan fortification machine-gun companies
  - 1 × Auto-Saharan Company
  - 1 × Auto-Saharan Company, 20/65 mod. 35 anti-aircraft guns
- Jalu Oasis
  - 1 × machine-gun battalion
  - 1 × Libyan reserve battalion
  - 1 × Auto-Saharan Company
  - 1 × anti-tank company, 47/32 mod. 1935 anti-tank guns
  - 1 × battery, 20/65 mod. 35 anti-aircraft guns

The 10th Army in Egypt consisted of 80,000 troops, 250 guns and 125 tanks.

==== Reinforcements ====
These reinforcements reached the 10th Army after the start of Operation Compass (data taken from Montanari, 1990).

- 60th Infantry Division "Sabratha", took up positions at Derna (General Guido Della Bona)
  - 85th Infantry Regiment "Sabratha", 3 × battalions, 1 × battery, 65/17 mod. 13 mountain guns, 1 × company, 81 mm mortars
  - 86th Infantry Regiment, 3 × battalions, 1 × company, 81 mm mortars
  - 42nd Artillery Regiment, 2 × groups 75/27 mod. 11 field guns
  - LXIV Machine-Gun Battalion
  - LXIV Mixed Engineer Battalion
  - Attached units
    - 60th Bersaglieri Motorcycle Company
    - XVIII Libyan Infantry Battalion
    - 1 × machine-gun battalion
    - 1 × group, 75/27 mod. 11 field guns
    - 3 × anti-tank companies 47/32 mod. 1935 anti-tank guns
    - 6 × batteries 65/17 mod. 13 mountain guns
    - 4 × batteries 20/65 mod. 35 anti-aircraft guns
    - 1 × chemical company
- Bignami Column, took up positions at Mechili (General Mario Bignami, organised 22 January 1940)
  - 10th Artillery Regiment, 1 × group, 75/27 mod. 11 field guns (from 25th Infantry Division "Bologna")
  - VI Tank Battalion M13/40, 33rd Tank Infantry Regiment, 37 × M13/40 tanks
  - XXI Tank Battalion M13/40, 37 × M13/40 tanks (Raised with personnel from the disbanded XXI Tank Battalion L in January 1941)
  - XXV Motorised Machine Gun Battalion (from the 25th Infantry Division "Bologna")
  - XXVII Motorised Machine Gun Battalion (from the 27th Infantry Division "Brescia")
- 10th Bersaglieri Regiment
  - XVI, XXXIV, XXXV Bersaglieri battalions
  - 1 × battery, 65/17 mod. 13 mountain guns
  - 1 × company, 81 mm mortars
- V Tank Battalion M13/40, 32nd Tank Infantry Regiment, 37 × M13/40 tanks, joined the Babini Group (Special Armoured Brigade)
- VII Anti-aircraft Group, 75/46 mod. 34 anti-aircraft guns

=== Western Desert Force ===
Western Desert Force, 9 December 1940 Details taken from Christie (1999) and Montanari (1990) unless specified.

- Commander-in-Chief, Middle East (General Sir Archibald Wavell)
- Western Desert Force (Lieutenant-General Richard O'Connor)
  - 1st Battalion, Royal Sussex (7th Indian Infantry Brigade battalion)
  - 4th Battalion, 11th Sikh Regiment (7th Indian Infantry Brigade battalion)
  - 7th Royal Tank Regiment (Until 11 December, then 6th Australian Division)
  - 2nd Heavy Anti-Aircraft Regiment Royal Artillery
  - 7th Heavy Field Regiment Royal Artillery
  - 104th (Essex Yeomanry) Regiment, Royal Horse Artillery
  - 6 × light anti-aircraft batteries
  - 7th Armoured Division (Major General Michael O'Moore Creagh)
    - 4th Armoured Brigade (Brigadier J. A. L. Caunter)
      - 7th Queen's Own Hussars (−1 troop)
      - 2nd Royal Tank Regiment
      - 6th Royal Tank Regiment
    - 7th Armoured Brigade (Brigadier Hugh E. Russell)
      - 3rd The King's Own Hussars
      - 8th King's Royal Irish Hussars
      - 1st Royal Tank Regiment
    - Support Group (Infantry Brigade) (Brigadier William Gott)
      - 1st Battalion King's Royal Rifle Corps
      - 2nd Battalion Rifle Brigade
      - 1st Regiment Royal Horse Artillery
      - 4th Regiment Royal Horse Artillery
    - 11th Hussars (Prince Albert's Own) (Reconnaissance)
    - 3rd Regiment Royal Horse Artillery
    - 106th (Lancashire Yeomanry) Regiment, Royal Horse Artillery (2 × anti-tank batteries, 2 × anti-aircraft batteries)
    - 2nd (Cheshire) Field Squadron Royal Engineers
    - 141st Field Park Royal Engineers
    - 2 × Royal Air Force Regiment armoured car companies
  - 4th Indian Division (Major General Noel Beresford-Peirse, until 11 December)
    - 5th Indian Infantry Brigade (Brigadier Wilfrid Lewis Lloyd)
      - 1st Battalion, Royal Fusiliers
      - 3rd Battalion, 1st Punjab Regiment
      - 4th Battalion, 6th Rajputana Rifles
      - 1× anti-tank company
    - 11th Indian Infantry Brigade (Brigadier Reginald Savory)
      - 1st Battalion, 6th Rajputana Rifles
      - 2nd Battalion, Queen's Own Cameron Highlanders
      - 4th Battalion, 7th Rajput Regiment
      - 1 × anti-tank company
    - 16th British Infantry Brigade (Brigadier Cyril Lomax, until 11 December)
      - 2nd Battalion, Queen's Regiment
      - 1st Battalion, Argyll & Sutherland Highlanders
      - 2nd Battalion, Leicestershire Regiment
    - Central India Horse (21st King George V's Own Horse) (Reconnaissance)
    - 1st Battalion, Northumberland Fusiliers (machine gunners, 1 × company)
    - 1st Field Regiment Royal Artillery
    - 25th Field Regiment Royal Artillery
    - 31st Field Regiment Royal Artillery
    - 4th Field Squadron Royal Engineers
    - 12th Field Squadron Royal Engineers
    - 18th Field Squadron Royal Engineers
    - 21st Field Squadron Royal Engineers
    - 11th Field Park Royal Engineers
  - 7th Indian Infantry Brigade (Brigadier Harold Briggs, Mersa Matruh garrison, two battalions detached, until 11 December)
    - 2nd Battalion, 11th Sikh Regiment (detached from)
  - Selby Force (Brigadier Arthur Selby)
    - 3rd Battalion, Coldstream Guards
    - 1 × company Northumberland Fusiliers (Machine Gunners)
    - 1 × company, 1st Battalion, South Staffordshire Regiment
    - 1 × company, 1st Battalion, Cheshire Regiment
    - 1 × platoon, 1st Battalion Durham Light Infantry
    - 1 × troop, 7th Queen's Own Hussars
    - 1 × section, 8th Field Regiment Royal Artillery
    - 1 × section, 107th (South Nottinghamshire Hussars) Regiment, Royal Horse Artillery
  - 6th Australian Division (Major General Iven Mackay, from 11 December)
    - 16th Australian Infantry Brigade (Brigadier Arthur Allen)
      - 2/1st Australian Battalion
      - 2/2nd Australian Battalion
      - 2/3rd Australian Battalion
    - 17th Australian Infantry Brigade (Brigadier Stanley Savige)
      - 2/5th Australian Battalion
      - 2/6th Australian Battalion
      - 2/7th Australian Battalion
    - 19th Australian Infantry Brigade (Brigadier Horace Robertson)
      - 2/4th Australian Battalion
      - 2/8th Australian Battalion
      - 2/11th Australian Battalion
    - 6th Division Reconnaissance Regiment (Reconnaissance)
    - 2/1st Field Regiment
    - 2/2nd Field Regiment
    - 2/3rd Field Regiment
    - 2/1st Field Company, Royal Australian Engineers
    - 2/2nd Field Company, Royal Australian Engineers
    - 2/3rd Field Company, Royal Australian Engineers

The Western Desert Force consisted of about 31,000 soldiers, 120 guns, 275 tanks and sixty armoured cars. The 4th Indian Division was exchanged with the 6th Australian Division for the pursuit after the first part of Operation Compass.

== See also ==
- North African campaign timeline
- List of British military equipment of World War II
- List of Australian military equipment of World War II
- List of Italian military equipment in World War II
- Military history of Italy during World War II
