= 10th Army (Italy) =

Field army of the Royal Italian Army in World War I and World War II

The 10th Army (Italian: 10ª Armata) was a field army of the Royal Italian Army, which fought in World War I and in Italian North Africa during World War II.

== World War I ==
=== Formation ===
After the Battle of Caporetto (November 1917) the Italian Army (Regio Esercito) was reorganized by Armando Diaz. In the summer of 1918 (after the Battle of the Solstice) the Command continued to modify these changes and in preparation for the Italian Offensive planned for October 1918, the new 10th Italian Army was formed on 14 October. It was a British–Italian Army under command of the Earl of Cavan. It consisted of

- 1 Italian Army corps, the XI Corps (Italian) (Corpo d'Armata) of Lt. General Giuseppe Paolini.
  - 37th division of Maj. General Giovanni Castagnola (Brigata Macerata of Brig. General Florenzio Tagliaferri, 121st and 122nd Infantry Regiments; Brigata Foggia of Brig. General Raffaele Radini Tedeschi, 280th and 281st Infantry Regiments)
  - 23rd Bersaglieri Division of Lt. General Gustavo Fara (VI Brigade of Brig. General Giovanni Deo, 8th and 13th Regiments; VII Brigade of Brig. General Alessandro Pirzio Biroli, 2nd and 3rd Regiments)
- 2 divisions of the British XIV Corps of the General James Babington.
  - 7th Division of Maj. General Thomas Herbert Shoubridge (20th, 22nd and 91st Infantry Brigade, 22nd and 35th Field Artillery Brigade, 2 batteries of trench mortars plus a pioneer battalion).
  - 23rd division of the Maj. General H.F. Thuillier (68th, 69th and 70th infantry brigades, a group of cavalry squadrons, the 102nd and 103rd field artillery brigades, 2 batteries of trench mortars and another pioneer battalion).

At the same time General Jean César Graziani of France was asked to command another new Italian Army (joint), the 12th Army consisting of I Corps (Italy), the 52nd Division – Alpini (Italy) and 23rd Division (France).

=== The Final Battle ===
The newly constituted 10th Army participated in the victory of the Battle of Vittorio Veneto (October–November 1918). The Army was inserted between the Italian 8th and 3rd Armies at the Piave River. The 8th Army was to cross the Piave River and advance to Vittorio in order to split the Austro-Hungarian Trentino Army from the ones defending Piave. The 10th Army was to protect their right flank. They were also expected to cross the Piave by breaking the Austro-Hungarian defenses at Grave di Papadopoli, a large island in the river.

The 10th Army was augmented by the addition of the following Italian troops prior to the battle:

- XI Reparto d'Assalto (Arditi).
- A squadron of cavalry of the 11th Cavalleggeri di Foggia.
- Three battalions of engineers: two bridge building units and one sapper unit.
- 10th and 14th armored car squadrons.
- Artillery: 2 field artillery regiments and a bomb group.
- Fifty Sailors (18th Pontieri Company)

The pontieri played an important preparatory role by transporting a contingent of British soldiers by boat to the island to surprise the Austro-Hungarian garrison there and gain control of the island before the commencement of the battle.

The 10th Army provided one of the early successes in the Battle as it established a bridgehead on the left bank of the river, despite high and fast waters (floods) in the river. In fact, elements of the 8th Army had to improvise and use the 10th Army's crossings in order to initially get across the river and then achieve the capture of Vittorio. The 10th Army proceeded to speed across the Italian countryside crossing the Tagliamento River towards 1) Tolmezzo (the XIV Corps) and 2) Udine (the XI Corps) as the Austro-Hungarian Army rapidly retreated and then collapsed.

The 10th Army was subsequently joined in the Battle by the 332nd Infantry Regiment (United States), as part of the British XIV Corps; the American regiment forming the advance guard of the corps. On 4 November, when the Italian armistice came into effect, the line of the 10th Army was Basagliapenta-Meretto di Tomba-Coseano-S. Daniele-Pinzano.

== World War II ==
In 1940, the 10th Army was based in Cyrenaica (eastern Libya) and faced the British in the Kingdom of Egypt, a British ally. The 5th Army was based in Tripolitania (western Libya) opposite French Tunisia.

When Italy declared war on 10 June 1940 the 10th Army consisted of five divisions and the 5th Army consisted of nine. After the Fall of France at the end of June, several divisions were transferred from the 5th Army to strengthen the 10th Army, which was increased to ten divisions.

=== Italian invasion of Egypt ===
On 13 September 1940, about four divisions of the 10th Army conducted the Italian invasion of Egypt. Four infantry divisions and the Maletti Group marched 100 kilometres (62 mi) in four days and stopped at Sidi Barrani. The Maletti Group included most of the M11/39 medium tanks in North Africa and numerous L3 tankettes. Defensive positions were prepared by the Italians in fortified camps.

=== British counter-attack ===
In December 1940 during Operation Compass, the British counter-attacked in what initially was to be a five-day raid against the Italian camps in Egypt. The Italian camps were overrun and the rest of the 10th Army was pushed further and further back into Italian Libya. Many Italian soldiers surrendered once the British troops encircled them in fortified places like Bardia and Tobruk.

=== Destruction at Beda Fomm ===
At the Battle of Beda Fomm (6–7 February 1941), most of the remainder of the retreating 10th Army was isolated by Combeforce (Lieutenant-Colonel John Combe) a small advance guard of the 7th Armoured Division (Major-General Michael O'Moore Creagh). Combeforce took a shortcut across the desert, to block the Italian army's retreat, while the 6th Australian Division continued the coastal pursuit. The force was delayed by the harsh terrain, so Combeforce was divided and the lighter, faster elements were detached to complete the interception, leaving the tracked vehicles to follow.

The first elements arrived at Msus late on the afternoon of 4 February and cleared the local garrison. During the following night and day the advance continued and the British artillery and infantry were in position across the coast road by 4:00 p.m. on 5 February. The head of the retreating Italian column arrived 30 minutes later. The Italians were stunned to find the British force blocking them at Beda Fomm, whose strength they greatly overestimated. With the Australians in pursuit, a desperate battle ensued, in which newly arrived Fiat M13/40 medium tank battalions were thrown against the British positions, at great loss. In the afternoon of 6 February, the 7th Armoured Division tanks arrived and harassed the Italian eastern flank.

On the morning of 7 February, the Italians attempted a final, desperate attempt to break through. By this stage, the British units were almost out of food, petrol and ammunition. Although the British blocking line was almost breached, the encircled Italian units – convinced of the overwhelming size and strength of the blocking force – surrendered. The 10th Army was destroyed.

== Commanders ==
- General Francesco Guidi (October 1939 – Summer 1940)
- General Mario Berti (Summer 1940 – December 1940)
- General Italo Gariboldi (December 1940 in temporary command of the Tenth Army because General Mario Berti was on sick leave and February 1941 after Berti's replacement, General Giuseppe Tellera, had been killed in action)
- General Giuseppe Tellera (December 1940 – February 1941 [KIA])

== Order of battle ==
- 10th Army (HQ Bardia) Commander – General Mario Berti (followed by General Italo Gariboldi; who was followed by General Giuseppe Tellera from 23 December 1940 until his death at Beda Fomm; who was followed by General Annibale Bergonzoli who surrendered to the British
  - Babini Group
    - III Tank Battalion "M" (M13/40 tanks)
    - V Tank Battalion "M" (M13/40 tanks)
  - 10th Bersaglieri Regiment
  - 12th Bersaglieri Regiment
  - 12th Artillery Regiment "Savona"
  - 26th Artillery Regiment "Pavia"
  - 55th Artillery Regiment "Brescia"
  - various machine gun battalions
  - XX Corps, HQ in Giovanni Berta (today Al Qubbah), Generale di Corpo d'Armata Ferdinando Cona
    - 60th Infantry Division "Sabratha" (Derna)
  - Libyan Divisions Group, HQ in Sidi Barrani, Generale di Corpo d'Armata Sebastiano Gallina
    - 1st Libyan Division (Al Maktilah)
    - 2nd Libyan Division (Tummar)
    - 4th CC.NN. Division "3 Gennaio" (Sidi Barrani)
    - 2nd Tank Group, Colonel Antonio Trivioli
      - II Tank Battalion "M" (minus one company; M11/39 tanks)
      - LXI Tank Battalion "L" (L3/35 tankettes)
    - Maletti Group (Nibeiwa)
      - Mixed Tank Battalion (1x M11/39 company, 1x L3/35 company)
  - XXI Corps, HQ in Sofafi, Generale di Corpo d'Armata Lorenzo Dalmazzo
    - 63rd Infantry Division "Cirene" (Rabia / Sofafi)
    - 64th Infantry Division "Catanzaro" (Buq Buq)
    - XX Tank Battalion "L" (L3/35 tankettes)
    - LX Tank Battalion "L" (minus one company; L3/35 tankettes)
    - LXIII Tank Battalion "L" (L3/35 tankettes)
  - XXII Corps, HQ in Tobruk, Generale di Corpo d'Armata Enrico Pitassi Mannella
    - 61st Infantry Division "Sirte" (Tobruk)
    - 1st Tank Group, Colonel Pietro Aresca
      - I Tank Battalion "M" (M11/39 tanks)
      - XXI Tank Battalion "L" (L3/35 tankettes)
      - LXII Tank Battalion "L" (L3/35 tankettes)
    - Fortress and artillery troops in Tobruk
  - XXIII Corps, HQ in Bardia, Generale di Corpo d'Armata Annibale Bergonzoli
    - 1st CC.NN. Division "23 Marzo" (along the coast between Buq Buq and Sidi Barrani)
    - 2nd CC.NN. Division "28 Ottobre" (Sollum)
    - 62nd Infantry Division "Marmarica" (covering the escarpment between Sofafi and Halfaya)
    - Frontier Guards and Fortress troops in Bardia
  - Regia Aeronautica (as of 10 June 1940)
    - 5th Squadron General Felip Porro
      - 2 Stormo: 60 CR.32, 25 CR.42
      - 10 Stormo: 31 SM.79
      - 14 Stormo: 43 SM.81, 12 SM.79, 1 BR.20
      - 15 Stormo: 21 SM.81, 37 SM.79, 3 BR.20
      - 33 Stormo: 31 SM.79
      - 50 Stormo: 68 Ba.65, 17 Ro.17, 23 Ca.31
      - 10 Gruppo: 27 CR.42
    - Colonial Garrison
      - 1 Gruppo: 32 Ghibli
      - 2 Gruppo: 27 various models
    - Air Observation
      - 64 Gruppo: 5 RO 1 Bis, 9 Ro.37 Bis
      - 73 Gruppo: 1 Ro.1 Bis, 8 Ro.37 Bis
      - 143 (Sea) Squadron: 6 Cant Z.501 (flying boats)

== See also ==
- Italian Expeditionary Force
- Armistice of Villa Giusti
- Military history of Italy during World War II
- Italian invasion of Egypt
- Operation Compass
- Maletti Group
