= Maletti Group =

Mechanised unit of the Italian Royal Army in the Second World War

- Raggruppamento Maletti
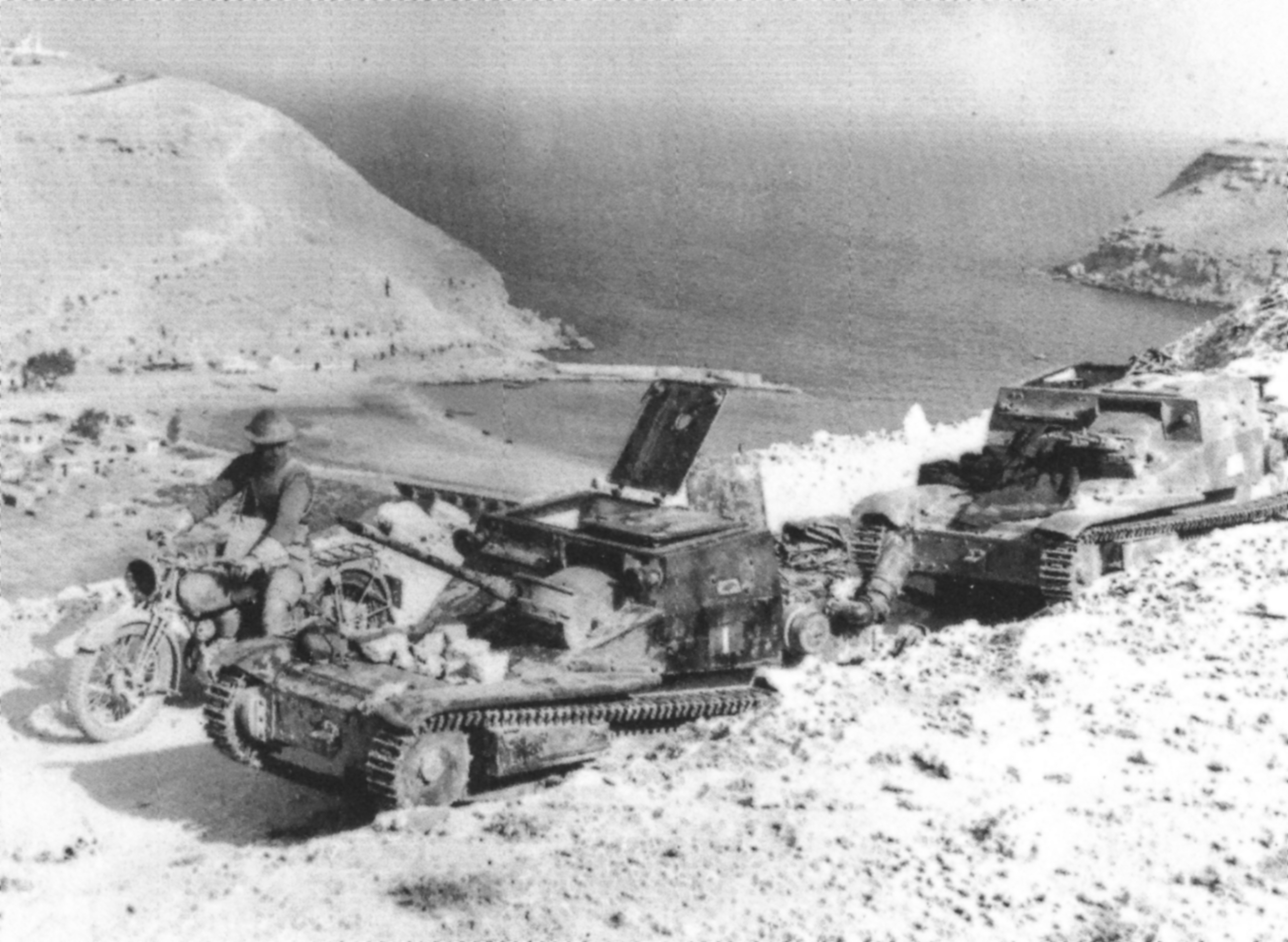
- Captured L3/35 and L3 cc tankettes outside Bardia, Libya 1941
- Active: June–December 1940
- Disbanded: December 1940
- Country: Italy
- Branch: Army
- Type: Mechanised
- Size: 6 infantry battalions 2 tank battalions
- Engagements: Italian invasion of Egypt; Operation Compass

Commanders
- General: Pietro Maletti †

The Maletti Group (Italian: Raggruppamento Maletti) was an ad hoc mechanised unit formed by the Italian Army (Regio Esercito) in Italian North Africa (Africa Settentrionale Italiana, ASI), early in the Western Desert Campaign of the Second World War. The Italian army had three armoured divisions in Europe but all were needed for the occupation of Albania and the forthcoming invasion of Greece, which began on 28 October 1940. The Raggruppamento Maletti was formed in June 1940, as part of the 10th Army (General Mario Berti) and contained all of the M11/39 medium tanks in Libya.

The medium tanks and tankettes already in the colony were to be combined with medium tanks sent from Italy, to form a new armoured division. A new headquarters, the Libyan Tank Command was established on 29 August as the Raggruppamento Maletti (Maletti Group). The group took part in Operazione E, the Italian invasion of Egypt in 1940 and reached Sidi Barrani on 16 September. The group was destroyed at the Nibeiwa camp on 9 December, during Operation Compass, a British raid against the 10th Army positions inside Egypt. The rest of the command and tank units arriving in Libya were combined in the Babini Group which was destroyed at the Battle of Beda Fomm (6–7 February 1941), the defeat of the 10th Army, which led to the British occupation of Cyrenaica.

== Background ==
=== 32nd Tank Infantry Regiment ===
The 32nd Tank Infantry Regiment was formed on 1 December 1938 and on 1 February 1939 became part of the 132nd Armored Division "Ariete", the second Italian armoured division. At the Italian declaration of war on 11 June 1940, the 32nd Tank Infantry Regiment moved with the Ariete from Veneto to the border with France, as part of the Army of the Po but the war ended so quickly that the division was not used. On 28 July 1939, the I and II Tank Battalion "M"s received 96 Fiat M11/39 tanks to replace its Fiat 3000s. The inadequacies of the M11/39 tanks led to a decision on 26 October 1939, to replace them with M13/40 tanks and the first batch, built by Ansaldo at Genoa in October 1940, were used to equip the III Tank Battalion "M" with 37 of the new tanks.

=== Raggruppamento Maletti ===
The I Tank Battalion "M" (Major Victor Ceva) and the II Tank Battalion "M" (Major Eugenio Campanile) and their M11/39 tanks, landed in Libya on 8 July 1940 and transferred from the 32nd Tank Infantry Regiment in Italy to the command of the 4th Tank Infantry Regiment in Libya. The two battalions had an establishment of 600 men, 72 tanks, 56 other vehicles, 37 motorcycles and 76 trailers. The medium tanks reinforced the 324 L3/35 tankettes already in Libya. Raggruppamento Maletti (General Pietro Maletti) was formed at Derna the same day, with seven Libyan motorised infantry battalions, a company of M11/39 tanks, a company of L3/33 tankettes, motorised artillery and supply units as the main motorised unit of the 10th Army and the first combined arms unit in North Africa.

== Prelude ==
=== Libyan Tank Command ===
On 29 August, as more tanks arrived from Italy, the Comando carri della Libia (Libyan Tank Command) was formed under the command of General Valentino Babini, with three Raggruppamenti. Raggruppamento Aresca (Colonel Pietro Aresca) with the I Tank Battalion "M" and the XXI, LXII and LXIII Tank Battalion "L"s, Raggruppamento Trivioli (Colonel Antonio Trivioli), with the II Tank Battalion "M", less one company and the IX, XX and LXI Tank Battalion "L"s and Raggruppamento Maletti with the LX Tank Battalion "L" and the remaining M11/39 company from the II Tank Battalion "M". Raggruppamento Maletti became part of the Regio Corpo Truppe Coloniali della Libia (Royal Corps of Libyan Colonial Troops), with the 1st Libyan Division and the 2nd Libyan Division.

=== Operazione E ===
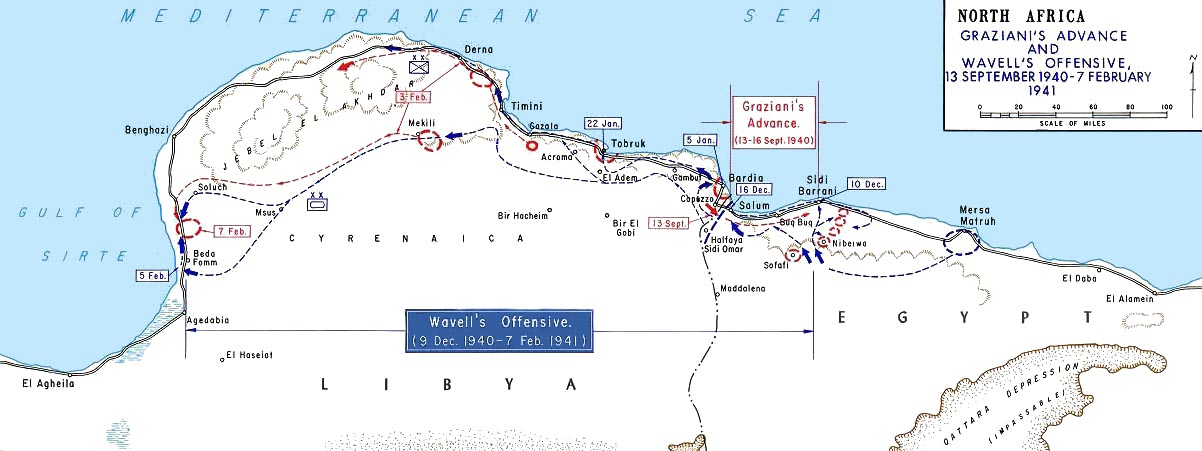
Military operations, 13 September 1940 – 7 February 1941 (click to expand)

Marshal Rodolfo Graziani revised Operazione E, the plan for the invasion of Egypt by the 10th Army. Sidi Barrani was made the objective, six days before the deadline for an invasion imposed by Mussolini. XXII Corps (Generale di Corpo d'Armata Petassi Manella) was in general reserve with the un-motorised divisions 64th Infantry Division "Catanzaro" and 4th CC.NN. Division "3 Gennaio". XXI Corps (Generale di Corpo d'Armata Lorenzo Dalmazzo) was at Tobruk as the 10th Army reserve, with the un-motorised divisions 61st Infantry Division "Sirte" and 2nd CC.NN. Division "28 Ottobre" and LX Tank Battalion "L". The XXIII Corps (Generale di Corpo d'Armata Annibale Bergonzoli) was the invasion spearhead and comprised the motorised 1st CC.NN. Division "23 Marzo", part-motorised 62nd Infantry Division "Marmarica" (with LXII Tank Battalion "L"), part-motorised 63rd Infantry Division "Cirene" (with LXIII Tank Battalion "L"), the un-motorised 1st Libyan Division, the un-motorised 2nd Libyan Division (with the IX Tank Battalion "L"), motorised Raggruppamento Maletti and Raggruppamento Aresca. Raggruppamento Trivioli was in reserve at Bardia.

A northern column with the Italian non-motorised divisions was to advance along the coast on the Via Balbia, cross the frontier and attack through the Halfaya Pass, to occupy Sollum and capture Sidi Barrani. A southern column with the 1st Libyan Division, 2nd Libyan Division and the Raggruppamento Maletti was to advance along the track from Dayr al Hamra to Bir ar Rabiyah and Bir Enba south of the escarpment, around the British inland (southern) flank. The flanking manoeuvre by the Raggruppamento Maletti misfired, because it lacked adequate maps and navigation equipment for desert travel and the group got lost as it moved to its jumping-off point at Sidi Omar.

XXIII Corps HQ had to send aircraft to guide the group into position. The accompanying 1st Libyan Division and 2nd Libyan Division were also delayed in reaching the rendezvous near Fort Capuzzo and the fiasco led Graziani to cancel the wide flanking manoeuvre. The 10th Army, in a mass of five divisions and the armoured groups, was ordered to move down the coast road, occupy Sollum and advance to Sidi Barrani through Buq Buq. Once at Sidi Barrani, the army would consolidate, extend the Via Balbia by building the Via della Vittoria to move supplies forward, destroy British counter-attacks and then advance to Mersa Matruh. The immobility of the non-motorised infantry divisions forced Graziani to use the coast road, despite the mechanised forces in the army, to try to defeat the British with mass rather than manoeuvre.

== Western Desert Campaign ==
=== Invasion of Egypt ===
XXIII Corps advanced to Sidi Barrani along the coast road, having received enough lorries to motorise one infantry division and partly to motorise two more for the advance. Bergonzoli planned the advance with the 1st Raggruppamento Carri forward, followed by the fully motorised 1st CC.NN. Division "23 Marzo" and the 62nd Infantry Division "Marmarica" and 63rd Infantry Division "Cirene", which had been partly motorised and could shuttle elements forward. The un-motorised 1st Libyan Division and 2nd Libyan Division, were to march on foot for the 97 km (60 mi) to the objective and the Raggruppamento Maletti was to form the rearguard. The 1st Raggruppamento Carri was also kept in reserve, except for the LXII Tank Battalion "L" with L3/33 tankettes, which was attached to the 62nd Infantry Division "Marmarica" and the LXIII Tank Battalion "L" assigned to the 63rd Division Infantry "Cirene". The 2nd Raggruppamento Carri remained at Bardia, except for the IX Tank Battalion "L" which joined the 2nd Libyan Division. The Raggruppamento Maletti (3rd Raggruppamento Carri) had the II Tank Battalion "M" with M11/39 tanks and three Libyan infantry battalions, all motorised.

The 10th Army advanced to Sollum then along the coast road two divisions forward, behind a screen of motorcyclists, tanks, motorised infantry and artillery. On 14 September, the rest of the 1st Raggruppamento Carri followed the 1st Libyan Division and 2nd Libyan Division toward Bir Thidan el-Khadim. At Alam el Dab, just short of Sidi Barrani, about fifty Italian tanks supported by motorised infantry and artillery, tried to outflank and trap the British rear guard, which forced the 3rd Coldstream Guards battalion to retreat. By late on 16 September, the 1st Raggruppamento Carri had reached an area south-east of Sidi Barrani, with the 1st CC.NN. Division "23rd Marzo" and the XXIII Corps artillery, having been used cautiously for infantry support. The Raggruppamento Maletti was west of the objective, having been hampered by lack of supplies and disorganisation. The 1st CC.NN. Division "23 Marzo" took Sidi Barrani and the advance stopped at Maktila, 10 mi (16 km) beyond.

=== Operation Compass ===
==== Nibeiwa ====
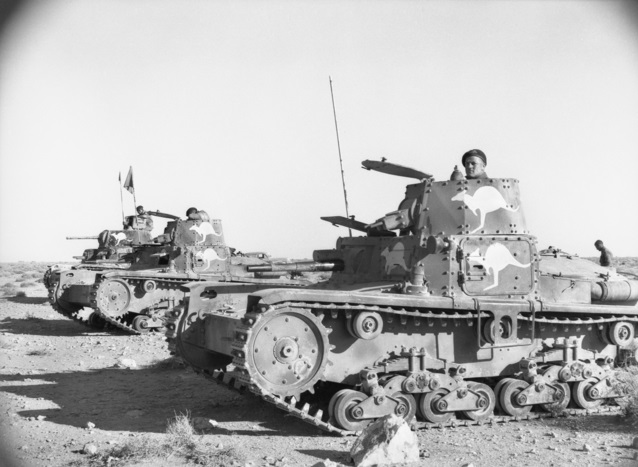
Captured Italian Fiat M11/39 tanks (005042)

The 10th Army planned to advance on Mersa Matruh on 16 December but the attack was forestalled by Operation Compass. Only the IX Tank Battalion "L" with L3/33 tankettes attached to the 2nd Libyan Division, the II Tank Battalion "M" with M11/39s, with the Raggruppamento Maletti at Nibeiwa camp and the LXIII and XX Tank Battalion "L"s, with the XXI Corps HQ, were still in Egypt. The five fortified camps from the coast to the escarpment were well defended but too far apart for overlapping fields of fire and the defenders relied on ground and air patrols to link the camps and watch the British. The camp at Nibeiwa was a rectangle about 1.6 km × 2.4 km (1 mi × 1.5 mi), with a bank and an anti-tank ditch. Mines had been laid but at the north-west corner, there was a gap in the minefield for delivery lorries and a British night reconnaissance found the entrance.

A lack of Italian air–ground co-operation was exploited by the British to attack Nibeiwa camp from the rear, with the 11th Brigade Group of the 4th Indian Division and the Matilda infantry tanks of the 7th Royal Tank Regiment (7th RTR). Italian air reconnaissance spotted British vehicle movements in the area but Maletti was apparently not informed. On 8 December, Maletti alerted the nearby 2nd Libyan Division that unusual low-level flying by the RAF was probably intended to disguise the movement of armoured units. At 6:30 a.m. on 9 December, well before the beginning of the main British attack, Maletti had contacted the commanders of the 1st Libyan Division and the 2nd Libyan Division, reporting the British preparatory movements.

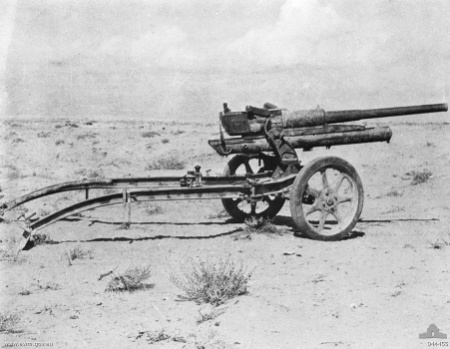
Italian 47 mm anti-tank gun, 1941 (AWM 044455)

At 5:00 a.m. on 9 December, British artillery commenced a one-hour diversionary bombardment from the east and at 7:15 a.m., the main 4th Indian divisional artillery opened fire. The 11th Indian Infantry Brigade Group and the 7th RTR attacked from the north-west, with Bren carriers on the flanks, all firing on the move. About twenty Italian medium tanks outside the camp were destroyed in the initial British attack, while warming their engines before breakfast. Italian artillery and machine-gun fire began as isolated parties of Italians tried to hunt the British Infantry tanks with hand grenades. At 7:45 a.m. Scottish and Indian infantry began methodically to sweep through the camp, backed by artillery and the tanks. By 10:40 a.m., the camp had been overrun and 2,000 Italian and Libyan prisoners had been taken, along with a large quantity of supplies and water for a British loss of 56 men. A total of 819 Italian and Libyan soldiers had been killed along with Maletti and 1,338 were wounded.

== Aftermath ==
=== Analysis ===
In his history of the 32nd Tank Infantry Regiment, Maurizio Parri wrote that a company of the II Tank Battalion "M" with its M11/39s had tried to counter-attack the British Matildas but the crews misunderstood flag signals, which caused delays and the attack failed. In 1944, Moorehead wrote that Maletti was wounded while rallying his men, then retreated to his tent with a machine-gun, where he was killed. Maletti's mortal remains were to be seen at the entrance of his tent by war correspondents who visited the camp. Moorehead wrote that he saw unattended donkeys wandering around looking for water and soldiers looting extravagant Italian army uniforms and lunching on luxury foods, wines and Recoaro mineral water. New equipment, weapons and ammunition strewed the ground, already disappearing under the sand and dozens of dug-outs were found to be full of food, new equipment and ammunition.

== Orders of battle ==
8 July 1940 (Note: Details taken from Christie (1999) unless specified.)

- Infantry (1st and 5th Libyan regiments)
  - I Libyan Infantry Battalion
  - III Libyan Infantry Battalion
  - IV Libyan Infantry Battalion
  - V Libyan Infantry Battalion
  - XVII Libyan Infantry Battalion
  - XVIII Libyan Infantry Battalion
  - XIX Libyan Infantry Battalion
  - Saharan Battalion
- Artillery
  - 1 × 65/17 Group (12 × guns)
  - 1 × 75/27 Group (8 × guns)
  - 2 × 47/32 anti-tank companies
  - 1 × 81mm mortar company
  - 2 × 20 mm anti-aircraft batteries
- Tanks
  - 1 × M11/39 tank company
  - 1 × L3/35 tankette company
- Engineers
  - 2 × Engineer companies
- Transport
  - 160 Camels
  - 500 vehicles

December 1940 (Note: Sidi Barrani became the base of Raggruppamento Maletti; its constituent formations changed several times up to December.)

- Raggruppamento Headquarters
- Infantry
  - I Libyan Infantry Battalion
  - V Libyan Infantry Battalion
  - XVII Libyan Infantry Battalion
  - XIX Libyan Infantry Battalion
  - I Saharan Battalion
- Artillery
  - I Gruppo 65/17 (12 × 65/17 guns)
  - II Gruppo 75/27 (12 × 75/27 guns)
  - 1 × Battery of 105/28 guns (4 × 105/28 guns)
  - 1 × Mortar company (9 × 81 mm mortar)
  - 1 × Anti-tank company (8 × 47/32 guns)
  - 1 × Anti-tank company (8 × 47/32 guns)
  - 1 × Battery AA guns (8 × 20 mm guns)
  - 1 × Battery AA guns (8 × 20 mm guns)
- Armour
  - II Tank Battalion "M" 4th Tank Infantry Regiment, (22 × M11/39)

== See also ==
- Military history of Italy during World War II
- Motorised infantry
