= Armando Pescatori =

Italian general during World War II

- Born: 11 February 1884; Parma, Kingdom of Italy
- Died: 23 August 1957 (aged 73); Rome, Italy
- Military career
- Allegiance: Kingdom of Italy
- Branch: Royal Italian Army
- Rank: Lieutenant General
- Commands: 90th Infantry Regiment "Salerno"; 2nd Libyan Division
- Conflicts: Italo-Turkish War; Battle of the Two Palms; First Italo-Senussi War; World War I; Battle of Vittorio Veneto; Pacification of Libya; World War II; Italian invasion of Egypt; Operation Compass; Battle of Sidi Barrani
- Awards: Silver Medal of Military Valor (twice); Bronze Medal of Military Valor (twice); Military Order of Italy; Order of the Crown of Italy

Armando Pescatori (Parma, 11 February 1884 – Rome, 23 August 1957) was an Italian general during World War II. Among Italy's most experienced generals in colonial warfare, he is noted for leading the 2nd Libyan Division also known as the "Pescatori Division".

== Biography ==
Pescatori was born in Parma on 11 February 1884, the son of Francesco Pescatori. On 14 September 1904 he began to attend the Royal Military Academy of Infantry and Cavalry in Modena. He graduated with the rank of infantry second lieutenant on 5 September 1907 and was assigned to the 4th Infantry Regiment "Piemonte".

After promotion to lieutenant on 5 September 1910, he participated in the Italo-Turkish War (1911-1912) and in the subsequent counterguerrilla operations in Libya from 1912 to 1915, being decorated with a silver and two bronze medals of military valor. He then returned to Italy and participated in the First World War with the rank of captain (with the 3rd Infantry Regiment "Piemonte") and later major. He distinguished himself at the command of a battalion of the 221st Infantry Regiment "Iono", and was awarded another bronze medal for military valor, subsequently transformed into a silver medal, for an action on the Tagliamento on November 4, 1918, during the battle of Vittorio Veneto.

Between 1920 and 1921 he attended the Army War School in Turin, and during the next decade he served in Italy's African colonies, becoming an officer of the Royal Corps of Colonial Troops of Cyrenaica. In 1923-1924 he was briefly in command of a battalion of the 48th Infantry Regiment "Ferrara" in Bari. On February 5, 1928, he was promoted to staff lieutenant colonel and returned to Italy, where he was assigned to the Bologna Army Corps, for special assignments. On 14 September 1931 he was promoted to colonel and became teacher of colonial operations at the War School in Turin from 1931 to 1934, after which he commanded the 90th Infantry Regiment "Salerno" from 1934 to 1937. On 20 May 1937 he returned to Cyrenaica as deputy commander of the 62nd Infantry Division Marmarica (under the command of General Angelo Rossi), then stationed in Tobruk, with the post of deputy commander. He retained this post after his promotion to brigadier general on 1 July 1937 and until 10 April 1939, when he was transferred to the Armed Forces High Command of North Africa in Tripoli.

On 1 March 1940, due to his deep colonial knowledge, he was given command of the new 2nd Libyan Division, composed of two groups of Libyan infantry (the 3rd and 4th) with three battalions each, a group of Libyan artillery on three batteries of 77/28 mm guns, two batteries of 20/65 Mod. 1935 machine guns, a company of 47/32 anti-tank guns, a battalion of engineers and various divisional services. The officers and specialized cadres were Italian, while the majority of the troops were Libyan. The division was also known as the "Pescatori" Division, after its commander. The commander of the 1st Division was General Luigi Sibille. These troops, which were also known as Regio Corpo Truppe Libiche, were intended to take part in the Italian invasion of Egypt.

During the Second World War, Italy declared war on 10 June 1940, Pescatori was still in command of the 2nd Libyan Division; on 1 July he was promoted to Major General, and on 16 September he participated in the conquest of Sidi Barrani in Egypt. He then settled in two camps at Tummar with his troops until 10 December 1940, when his division was overwhelmed and defeated by British troops during Operation Compass and he was captured and sent to India as a prisoner of war, being held in the Dehradun generals' POW camp until 1945. In June 1947, Pescatori was part of the monarchist movement and was associated with Marshal Giovanni Messe, who was a contender for the movement's leadership. After being repatriated, he was awarded the Officer Cross of the Military Order of Italy and promoted to Lieutenant General; he settled in Rome and became president of the local Officer's Club from 1947 to 1950. He died in the capital on 23 August 1957, at the age of 73.
