= Sebastiano Gallina =

Italian general

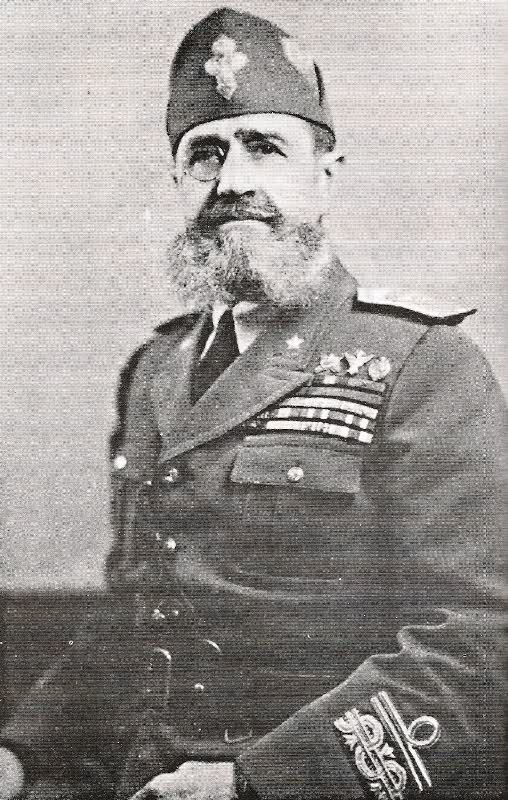
- Born: 5 October 1873; Cortemilia, Kingdom of Italy
- Died: 9 January 1945 (aged 71); Orbassano, Italian Social Republic
- Military career
- Allegiance: Kingdom of Italy
- Branch: Royal Italian Army
- Rank: Lieutenant General
- Commands: 2nd Libyan Battalion; 43rd Infantry Regiment; 1st Eritrean Mixed Brigade; Southern Libya Military Command; Libyan Army Corps
- Conflicts: Italo-Turkish War; World War I; Battle of Caporetto; Pacification of Libya; Second Italo-Ethiopian War; March of the Iron Will; World War II; Italian invasion of Egypt; Battle of Sidi Barrani
- Awards: Silver Medal of Military Valour (three times); Bronze Medal of Military Valour (three times); Order of the Crown of Italy; Colonial Order of the Star of Italy

Sebastiano Gallina (5 October 1873 – 9 January 1945) was an Italian general who served in the Italo-Turkish War, World War I, the Pacification of Libya, the Second Italo-Ethiopian War and World War II. Having spent most of his career in Italy's African colonies, he was considered among the most experienced Italian generals in colonial warfare.

== Biography ==
Gallina was born in Cortemilia, Piedmont, on 5 October 1873, the son of Patrizio and Camilla Genina. He enlisted in the Royal Italian Army as an infantry officer and fought as a lieutenant in the 18th Infantry Regiment during the Italo-Turkish War, receiving a Bronze Medal of Military Valour after distinguishing himself in the battle of Sciara-Sciat (9 November 1911). He remained in Libya after the end of the war, participating in counterguerrilla operations against Libyan rebels in the Fezzan region in 1914.

He returned to Italy after the outbreak of World War I and became a staff lieutenant colonel in the Fifth Army Corps; he was wounded twice during the battle of Caporetto and awarded a Silver Medal of Military Valour. After the end of the war he returned to Libya, serving with the Royal Corps of Colonial Troops of Tripolitania, and participating in the pacification of Libya. Leading the 2nd Libyan Battalion, he distinguished himself in the clashes of Ras El Gattara (21-22 February 1923) and Beni Ulid (27 December 1923), which earned him two more bronze medals of Military Valour. After promotion to colonel, he assumed command of the 43rd Infantry Regiment "Forlì" in the late 1920s, after which he left the army.

He returned to active duty on 10 March 1935, being sent to Eritrea in preparation for the outbreak of the Second Italo-Ethiopian War. With the rank of brigadier-general, he distinguished himself at the command of the 1st Eritrean Mixed Brigade; during the march towards Addis Ababa he was entrusted with the command of a flanking column, consisting of the 1st Eritrean Mixed Brigade, which marching through a very difficult and almost unknown terrain, achieved all assigned objectives. The "Gallina" column was the first to arrive in sight of Addis Ababa after marching for more than 400 kilometers in extremely difficult conditions. After the conquest of the capital, his Brigade was entrusted with the task of protecting the railway to Djibouti. He was later included by the Allies in a list of war criminals for crimes committed during the conquest of Ethiopia.

In 1936 Gallina was promoted to major general for war merit; after the conquest of Ethiopia he remained in East Africa where he led counter-guerrilla operations, being decorated with an additional two Silver Medals of Military Valour. On 4 April 1939 he was promoted to lieutenant general, and on 13 September that year he assumed command of the troops of southern Libya. He was still there when the Italy entered World War II on 10 June 1940. On 6 July 1940, due to his vast African experience, despite his advanced age (66 years), he was placed in command of the Libyan Army Corps (1st and 2nd Libyan Division, "Maletti" Group), with which he participated in the Italian invasion of Egypt (9-16 September 1940). After the capture of Sidi Barrani was conquered (16 September), the 10th Army of General Mario Berti stood in defense.

Gallina remained in Egypt with his units in the occupied zone, but his corps was destroyed and he was captured during the British counter-offensive on 10 December. He was then transferred to India, and imprisoned in the generals' POW camp of Dehradun; after suffering a mental breakdown, he was repatriated for medical reasons in March 1943, during a prisoner exchange held in Turkey.

After returning to Italy he retired to private life in Trana, near Turin, but was killed when the train on which he was travelling between Giaveno and Turin was strafed in Orbassano by Allied aircraft on 9 January 1945.
