= 62nd Infantry Division "Marmarica" =

Infantry division of the Royal Italian Army during World War II

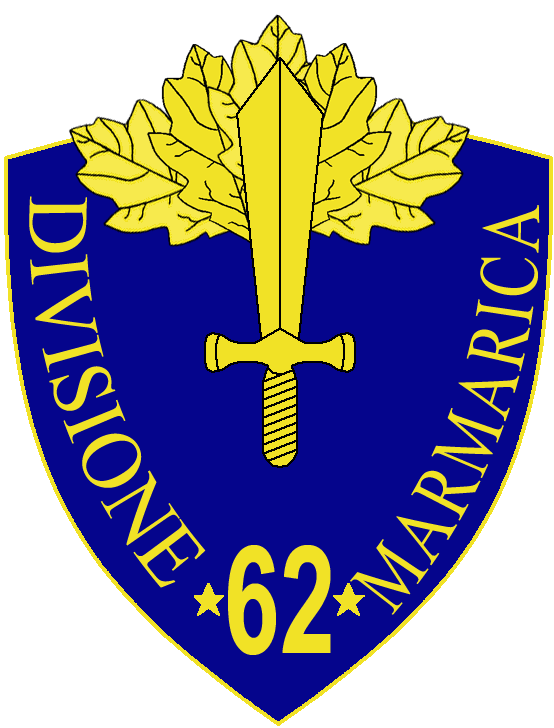
- 62nd Infantry Division "Marmarica" insignia
- Active: 1937–1941
- Country: Kingdom of Italy
- Branch: Royal Italian Army
- Type: Infantry
- Size: Division (Italian infantry divisions had at full strength about 13,000 men.)
- Garrison/HQ: Derna
- Engagements: World War II

Commanders
- Notable commanders: Ruggero Tracchia

Insignia
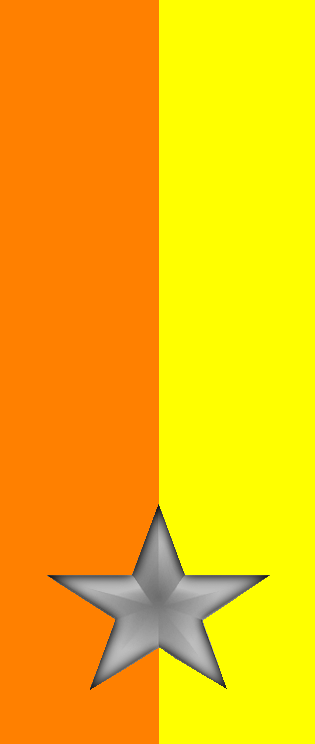
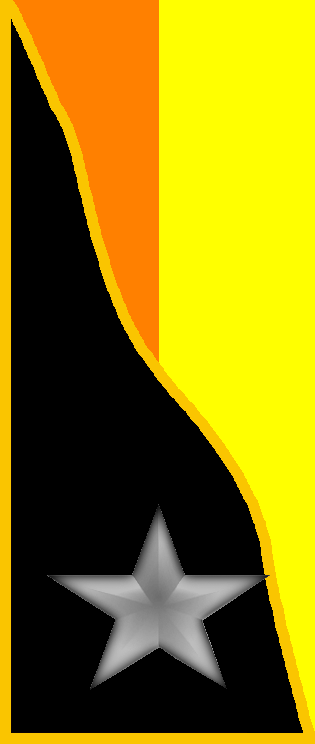
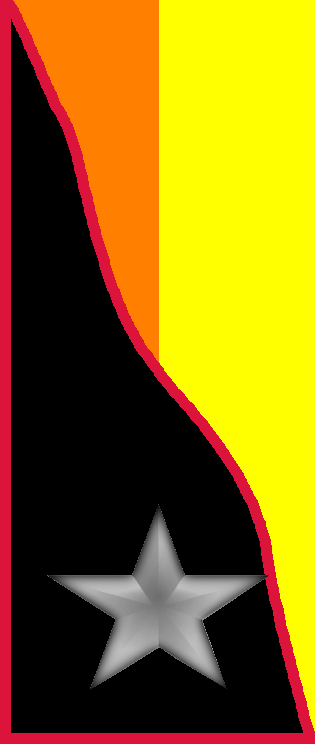
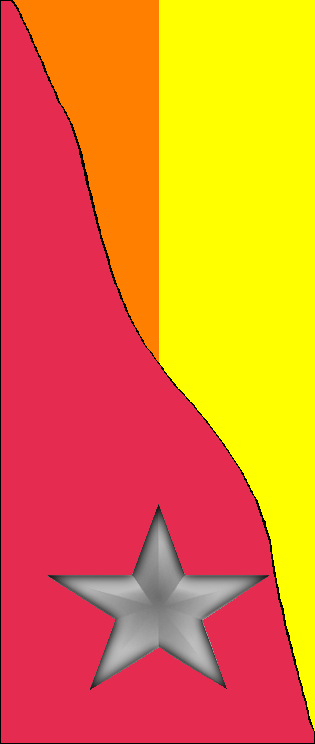
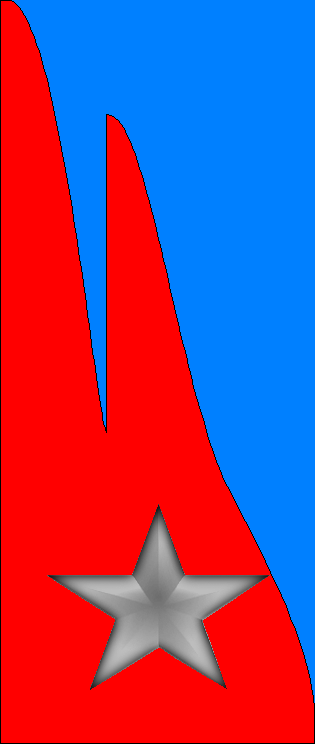
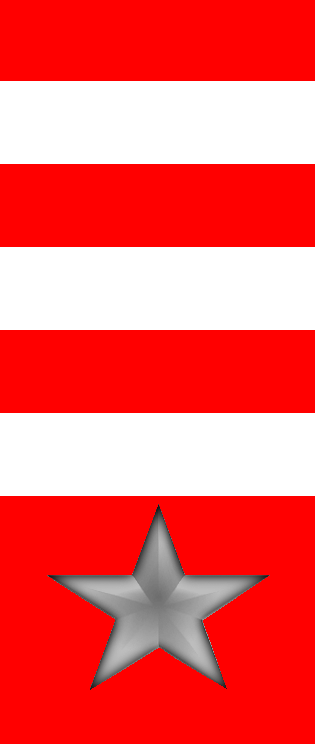
- Identification symbol: Marmarica Division gorget patches

The 62nd Infantry Division "Marmarica" (Italian: 62ª Divisione di fanteria "Marmarica") was an infantry division of the Royal Italian Army during World War II. The division was formed on 9 May 1937 in Derna in Italian Libya and named Marmarica after the antique name for the surrounding region. The division's regimental depots were in mainland Italy in Abruzzo and shared with the 24th Infantry Division "Pinerolo", with both divisions recruiting their troops from and training them there. The Marmarica was classified as an auto-transportable division, meaning it had some motorized transport, but not enough to move the entire division at once. The division was destroyed on 5 January 1941 during the Battle of Bardia.

== History ==
The division's lineage begins with the Brigade "Treviso" established in March 1915 with the 115th and 116th infantry regiments. The brigade fought on the Italian front in World War I. The brigade and its regiments were disbanded on 11 November 1917 after they were annihilated in the Battle of Caporetto.

The brigade and its two regiments were reformed on 28 February 1918 in Recoaro by renaming the 99th and 100th infantry regiments. The brigade returned to the front on 4 April 1918 and was disbanded after the war's end. On 9 May 1937 the 62nd Infantry Division "Marmarica" was activated in Derna in Libya. On 15 May of the same year the division received the 115th Infantry Regiment "Treviso" from the 102nd Motorized Division "Trento". On 18 July 1937 the 116th Infantry Regiment "Treviso" was reactivated in Racalmuto in Sicily and transferred on 17 September to Libya. The 116th Infantry Regiment had already been active from 15 July 1935 to 1 November 1936 and had deployed with the 102nd Motorized Division "Trento" to Libya during the Second Italo-Ethiopian War. In 1937 the 44th Artillery Regiment was reactivated in Italy and then transferred to Libya to join the Marmarica.

The division's major units were:

- 62nd Infantry Division "Marmarica", in Derna
  - 115th Infantry Regiment "Treviso", in Derna
  - 116th Infantry Regiment "Treviso", in Tobruk
  - 44th Artillery Regiment, in Derna

In 1939 the division's three regiments were renamed "Marmarica".

=== World War II ===
After Italy's entry into World War II on 10 June 1940 the Marmarica moved to Bardia near the border with British Egypt. From 14 June 1940 to 23 July 1940 the division skirmished with British forces in the area of Fort Capuzzo. From 9 September 1940 the Marmarica participated in the Italian invasion of Egypt, with the division covering the 10th Army's right (inland) flank during the advance to Sidi Barrani. On 13 September 1940, the division passed the Halfaya Pass and was ordered to stop and prepare for the defense.

The British Operation Compass started on 18 November 1940 and cut the division off from the bulk of the Axis forces. During the Battle of Marmarica on 11 December 1940, the division was located at Sidi Omar to the south of Sollum. During the first day of fighting it became obvious that the Marmarica's positions were untenable, therefore the division retreated to the stronghold of Bardia, where the divisions entered new defensive positions by 16 December 1940.

On 3 January 1941, the British resumed their offensive, resulting in the Battle of Bardia. As the Allied forces advanced, several large Italian units were surrounded, cut off from supplies, and defeated. After some hard fighting, one position after another surrendered. The Australians captured Bardia on 5 January, taking 36,000 prisoners and 462 guns for a loss of 130 dead and 326 wounded of their own. Whenever the Italians choose to fight, the fighting was fierce. An Australian historian later wrote that "in parts their defense was most efficient and often extremely brave." But the majority of Italian units surrendered without fight, their morale sapped by hunger, thirst, lice and dysentery.

== Organization ==
62nd Infantry Division "Marmarica" organization in 1940

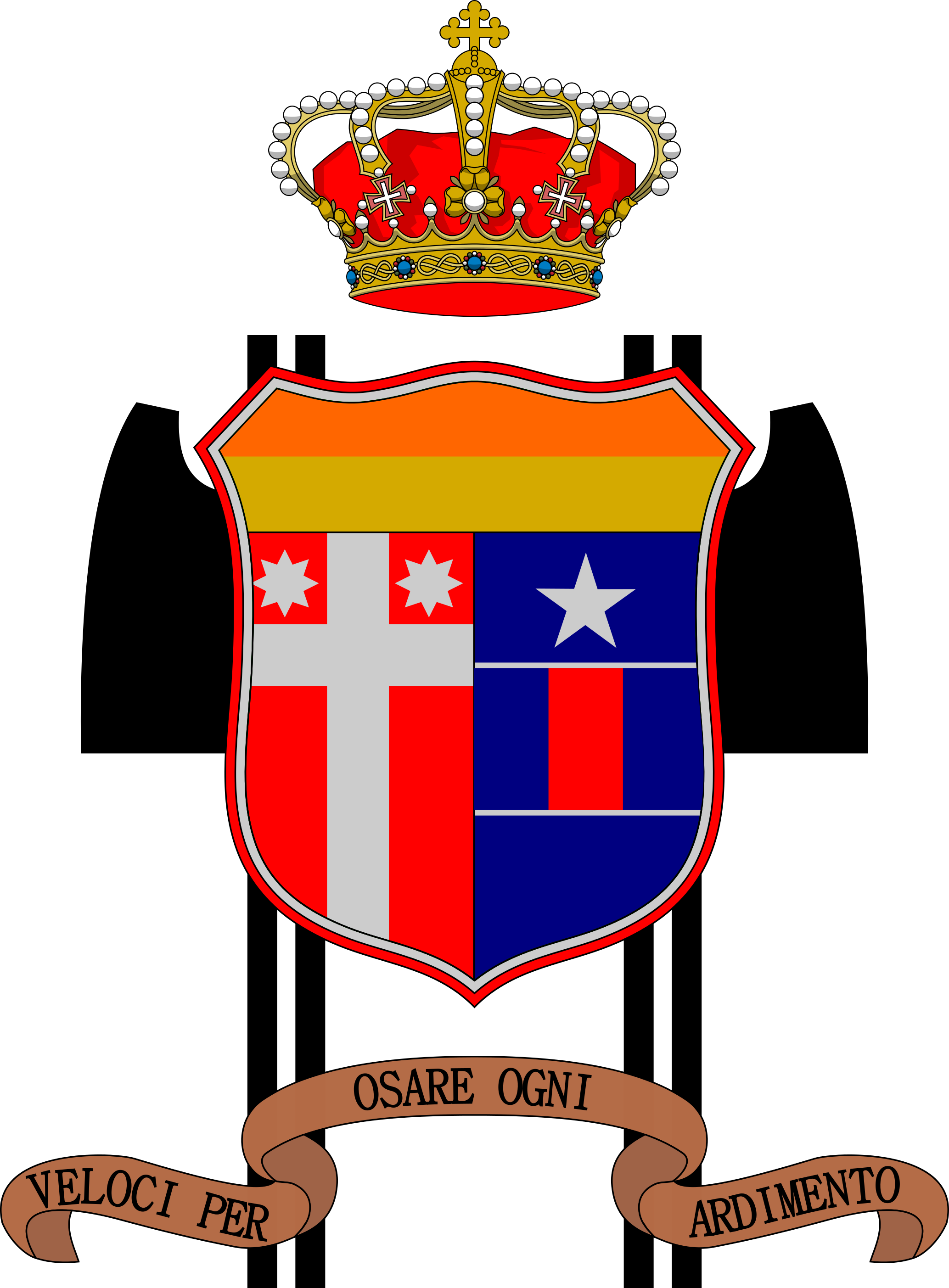
Coat of Arms of the 115th Infantry Regiment "Treviso", 1939

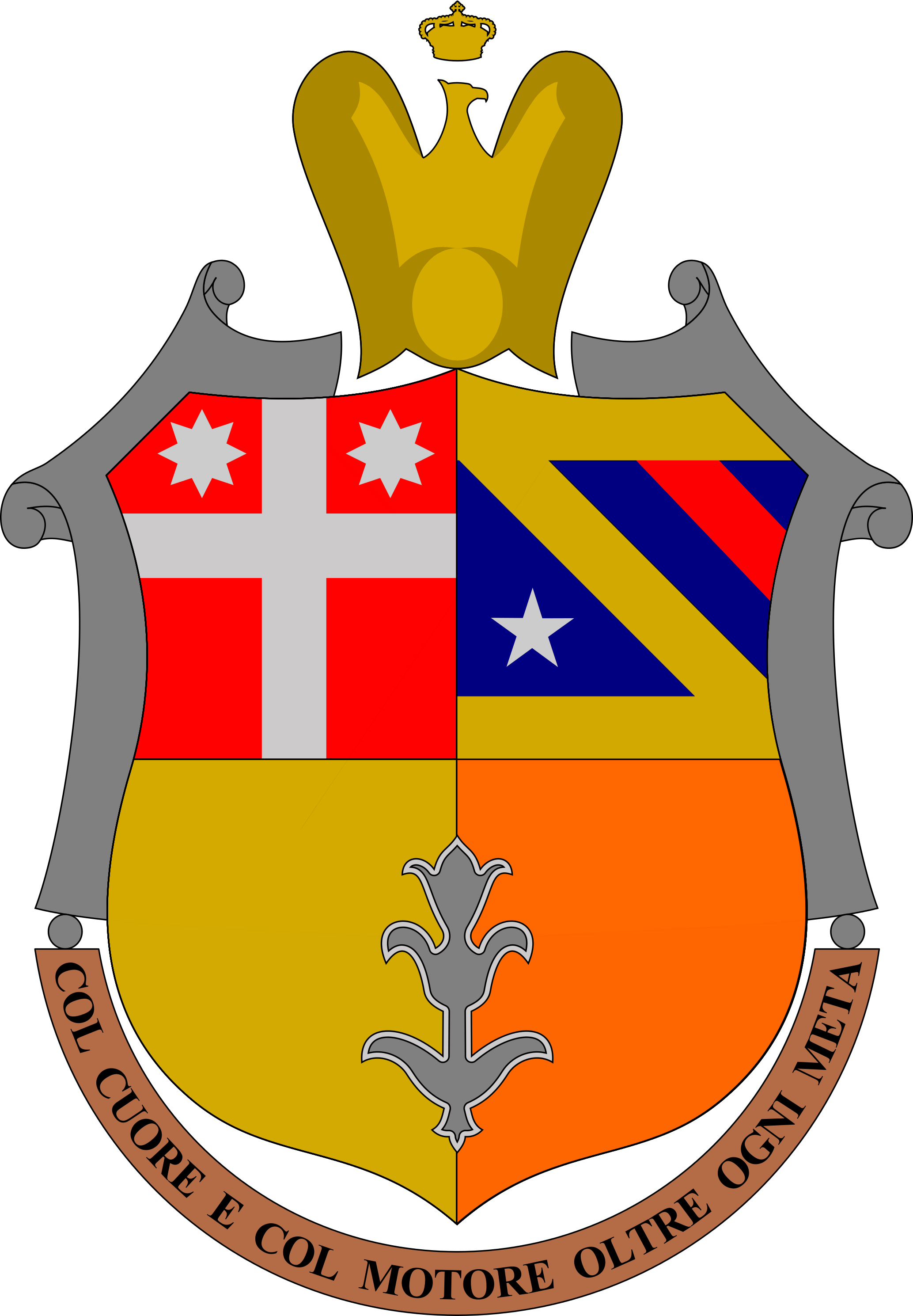
Coat of Arms of the 116th Infantry Regiment "Treviso", 1939

- 62nd Infantry Division "Marmarica"
  - Headquarters
    - Command Company
    - 1 × Carabinieri Section
    - 262nd Field Post Office
    - 62nd Infantry Division Command Transport Squad
  - 115th Infantry Regiment "Marmarica" (Note: Named 115th Infantry Regiment "Treviso" until 1939 when the army reorganized its divisions as binary divisions and divisional infantry regiments took the name of the division.)
    - Command Company
    - 3 × Fusilier battalions
    - Support Weapons Battery (65/17 mod. 13 infantry support guns)
    - Mortar Company (81mm mod. 35 mortars)
  - 116th Infantry Regiment "Marmarica" (Note: Named 116th Infantry Regiment "Treviso" until 1939 when the army reorganized its divisions as binary divisions and divisional infantry regiments took the name of the division.)
    - Command Company
    - 3 × Fusilier battalions
    - Support Weapons Battery (65/17 mod. 13 infantry support guns)
    - Mortar Company (81mm mod. 35 mortars)
  - 44th Artillery Regiment "Marmarica"
    - Command Unit
    - I Group (75/27 mod. 06 field guns; formed by the depot of the 3rd Artillery Regiment "Fossalta", re-equipped with 100/17 mod. 14 howitzers)
    - II Group (75/27 mod. 06 field guns; formed by the depot of the 17th Artillery Regiment "Sforzesca")
    - III Group (75/27 mod. 06 field guns; formed by the depot of the 18th Artillery Regiment "Gran Sasso")
    - 62nd Anti-aircraft Battery (20/65 mod. 35 anti-aircraft guns)
    - 262nd Anti-aircraft Battery (20/65 mod. 35 anti-aircraft guns)
    - Ammunition and Supply Unit
  - LXII Tank Battalion L (L3/35 tankettes)
  - LXII Machine Gun Battalion
  - LXII Mixed Engineer Battalion
    - 62nd Telegraph and Radio Operators Company
    - 1 × Engineer Company
    - 1 × Searchlight Section
  - LXII Replacements Battalion
  - 62nd Bersaglieri Motorcyclists Company
  - 62nd Anti-tank Company (47/32 mod. 35 anti-tank guns)
  - 62nd Transport Unit
  - 1 × Medical Section
    - 2 × Field hospitals
    - 1 × Surgical unit
  - 1 × Supply Section

== Commanding officers ==
The division's commanding officers were:

- Generale di Divisione Angelo Rossi (9 May 1937 - 9 December 1938)
- Generale di Brigata Armando Pescatori (acting, 10 December 1938 - 9 April 1939)
- Generale di Divisione Francesco Laviano (10 April 1939 - 24 May 1940)
- Generale di Divisione Ruggero Tracchia (25 May 1940 - 5 January 1941, POW)

== Bibliography ==
- Churchill, Winston (1949). Volume 2: Their Finest Hour. The Second World War (1st ed.). Houghton Mifflin Company.
- Latimer, Jon (2000). Operation Compass 1940: Wavell's Whirlwind Offensive. Oxford: Osprey. ISBN 1-85532-967-0.
- Mead, Richard (2007). Churchill's Lions: A biographical guide to the key British generals of World War II. Stroud (UK): Spellmount. pp. 544 pages. ISBN 978-1-86227-431-0.
- Paoletti, Ciro (2008). A Military History of Italy. Greenwood Publishing Group. ISBN 978-0-275-98505-9.
