= 2nd Libyan Division (Italy) =

Infantry division of the Royal Italian Army during World War II

- Active: 1939–1941
- Country: Kingdom of Italy
- Branch: Royal Italian Army
- Type: Infantry
- Size: Division
- Nickname: Pescatori
- Engagements: World War II: Italian invasion of Egypt; Battle of Sidi Barrani

The 2nd Libyan Division (Italian: 2ª Divisione libica) was an infantry division of the Royal Italian Army during World War II. In December 1940, the division formed, together with the 1st CC.NN. Division "23 Marzo" and 2nd CC.NN. Division "28 Ottobre", the XXIII Army Corps. The corps participated in the Italian invasion of Egypt and was destroyed during the Battle of Sidi Barrani.

== History ==
On 1 March 1940, the 2nd Libyan Division and 1st Libyan Division were formed from existing units in Italian Libya. Both divisions consisted of Italian officers and local non-commissioned officers and troops. In September 1940 the 2nd Libyan Division participated in the Italian invasion of Egypt. The original invasion plan of a flanking move through the desert had been modified due to the shortage of transport capacity and so the 1st Libyan Division and 2nd Libyan Division were brought close to the coastal road to be the spearhead for the CC.NN. divisions of XXIII Army Corps. The Maletti Group would operate as a flank guard. After entering Egypt the Italian units stopped and built a series of fortified camps around Sidi Barrani.

The British noted that the Italian camps were dispersed and separated by large distances, which meant they could not support each other if attacked. Accordingly the plan for Operation Compass envisioned to defeat the Italians in detail in a five-day raid. On 9 December, the 2nd Libyan Division was located at Tummar and the British attack commenced on Tummar began at 13.50, after 7th Royal Tank Regiment had refuelled and re-armed and artillery had softened up the defences for an hour. A north-west approach was made and the tanks broke through the perimeter without much difficulty and were followed by the infantry. However, the defenders put up stronger opposition than at Nibeiwa but by 16.00 Tummar West had been overrun, except for the extreme north-east corner. The British tanks then shifted their point of attack to Tummar East, the greater part of which was captured by nightfall.

On 10 December, the 16th Indian Infantry Brigade was brought forward from the 4th Indian Infantry Division reserve and with elements of the 11th Indian Infantry Brigade were sent forward to attack Sidi Barrani. Moving forward it was in position barring the south and south-western exits to Sidi Barrani by 13.30. At 16.00, supported by the whole of the division's artillery, the attack, again with the support of 7th RTR, went in. The town was captured by nightfall and the remains of the two Libyan divisions and the 4th CC.NN. Division "3 Gennaio" were trapped between 16th Infantry Brigade and Selby Force. By 15 December, Sollum and Halfya had been captured as well as Fort Capuzzo and all Italian forces had been cleared from Egypt. The 2nd Libyan Division lost 26 officers and 1,327 men killed and 32 officers and 804 men wounded, with the survivors being taken prisoner. The division was declared lost on 11 December 1940.

== Organization ==
2nd Libyan Division organization

- 2nd Libyan Division
  - Headquarters
    - Command Company
    - 1 × Carabinieri section
    - 27th Field Post Office
  - 3rd Libyan Infantry Grouping
    - II Libyan Infantry Battalion "Offella"
    - VI Libyan Infantry Battalion "Gefara"
    - VII Libyan Infantry Battalion "Buerat"
  - 4th Libyan Infantry Grouping
    - XIV Libyan Infantry Battalion "Sorman"
    - XV Libyan Infantry Battalion "Tefren"
    - XVI Libyan Infantry Battalion "Aziza"
  - 2nd Libyan Artillery Grouping
    - I Libyan Artillery Group (77/28 field guns)
    - II Libyan Artillery Group (77/28 field guns)
    - 1st Libyan Anti-aircraft Battery (20/65 mod. 35 anti-aircraft guns)
    - 2nd Libyan Anti-aircraft Battery (20/65 mod. 35 anti-aircraft guns)
  - II Libyan Mixed Engineer Battalion
    - 1 × Libyan engineer company
    - 1 × Libyan telegraph and radio operators company
    - 1 × Searchlight section
  - 2nd Libyan Anti-tank Company (47/32 mod. 35 anti-tank guns)
  - 2nd Libyan Transport Group
  - 1 × Medical section
  - 1 × Supply section

Attached to the division in Egypt:

- IX Tank Battalion "L" (L3/33 and L3/35 tankettes)

== Commanding officers ==
The division's commanding officers were:

- Generale di Divisione Armando Pescatori (1 March 1940 - 11 December 1940, POW)

== Bibliography ==
- Jowett, Philip S. (2000). The Italian Army 1940-45 (1): Europe 1940-1943. Osprey, Oxford - New York. ISBN 978-1-85532-864-8.
- Macksey, Major Kenneth (1971). Beda Fomm: The Classic Victory. Ballantine's Illustrated History of the Violent Century, Battle Book Number 22. New York: Ballantine Books. ISBN 978-0-345-02434-3.
- Paoletti, Ciro (2008). A Military History of Italy. Greenwood. ISBN 978-0-275-98505-9.
- Playfair, I. S. O.; et al. (1959) [1954]. Butler, J. R. M. (ed.). The Mediterranean and Middle East: The Early Successes Against Italy (to May 1941). History of the Second World War, United Kingdom Military Series. Vol. I (3rd impression ed.). HMSO. OCLC 888934805.
