= 1st Libyan Division (Italy) =

Infantry division of the Royal Italian Army during World War II

- Active: 1939–1941
- Country: Kingdom of Italy
- Branch: Royal Italian Army
- Type: Infantry
- Size: Division
- Nickname: Sibille
- Engagements: World War II

The 1st Libyan Division (Italian: 1ª Divisione libica) was an infantry division of the Royal Italian Army during World War II. It was commanded by general Luigi Sibille. The division took part in the Italian invasion of Egypt and was destroyed during the Battle of Sidi Barrani.

== History ==
The division's history begins with the Italian Libyan Colonial Division formed in the 1920s with local troops from Italian Libya. The division fought in the Second Italo-Abyssinian War.

On 1 March 1940 the 1st Libyan Division and 2nd Libyan Division were formed from existing units in Italian Libya. Both divisions consisted of Italian officers and local non-commissioned officers and troops. By the time Italy entered World War II the division had 7,224 troops and its commanding general was Luigi Sibille.

In September 1940 the 1st Libyan Division participated in the Italian invasion of Egypt. On 13 September the 1st Libyan Division and 1st Paratroopers Regiment "Fanti dell'Aria" attacked Sollum in British Egypt, which was defended by platoons of the Coldstream Guards. The British laid mines in the area and quickly withdrew to Marsa Matruh after suffering 50 casualties.

In December 1940 the 1st Libyan Division was deployed farthest of all Italian division into Egypt. Consequently its camp at Maktila was the first to be attacked during the British Operation Compass. On 10 December 1940, amid a howling sandstorm, the division offered stiff resistance, but by 11 December the division had disintegrated with heavy losses. The division was declared lost on 11 December 1940.

== Organization ==
1st Libyan Division organization

- 1st Libyan Division
  - Headquarters
    - Command Company
    - 1 × Carabinieri section
    - 262nd Field Post Office (replaced by the 26th Field Post Office in September 1940)
  - 1st Libyan Infantry Grouping
    - VIII Libyan Infantry Battalion "Bardia"
    - IX Libyan Infantry Battalion "Agedabia"
    - X Libyan Infantry Battalion "Nufilia"
  - 2nd Libyan Infantry Grouping
    - XI Libyan Infantry Battalion "Derna"
    - XII Libyan Infantry Battalion "Barce"
    - XIII Libyan Infantry Battalion "Zezem"
  - 1st Libyan Artillery Grouping
    - VI Libyan Artillery Group (77/28 field guns)
    - VII Libyan Artillery Group (77/28 field guns)
    - 6th Libyan Anti-aircraft Battery (20/65 mod. 35 anti-aircraft guns)
    - 7th Libyan Anti-aircraft Battery (20/65 mod. 35 anti-aircraft guns)
  - I Libyan Mixed Engineer Battalion
    - 1 × Libyan engineer company
    - 1 × Libyan telegraph and radio operators company
    - 1 × Searchlight section
  - 1st Libyan Anti-tank Company (47/32 mod. 35 anti-tank guns)
  - 1st Libyan Transport Group
  - 1 × Medical section
  - 1 × Supply section

== Commanding officers ==
The division's commanding officers were:

- Generale di Brigata Luigi Sibille (1 March 1940 - 8 July 1940)
- Generale di Brigata Giovanni Cerio (9 July 1940) - 11 December 1940, POW)

== See also ==
- Italian Libyan Colonial Division
- 2nd Libyan Division
- Maletti Group
- History of Libya as Italian Colony
