= XXIII Army Corps (Italy) =

Formation of the Italian World War II army

The Italian XXIII Army Corps (Italian: XXIII Corpo d'Armata) was a formation of the Italian army in World War II.

== History ==
There was a XXIII Corps in World War I, formed in Padua, which existed between 10 April 1917 and 15 July 1919.

The Corps was reformed in Al-Khums in Libya on 15 October 1939 and participated in the Italian Invasion of Egypt.
Like the rest of the Italian 10th Army, it had to retreat and took up defensive positions in the major Italian fortification of Bardia.
During the Battle of Bardia, the town was overrun by the 6th Australian Division, and despite its numerical superiority, the entire XXIII Corps was taken prisoner on 5 January 1941 and disbanded.

On 15 June 1942, a new XXIII Corps was formed in Trieste to defend the coast and the Trieste. On 10 September 1943, the Corps was disarmed by the Germans and disbanded.

== Composition ==
=== In 1940 ===
- 1st CC.NN. Division "23 Marzo"
- 2nd CC.NN. Division "28 Ottobre"
- 2nd Libyan Division

=== 1942–1943 ===
- 2nd Infantry Division "Sforzesca"
- 23rd Border Guard Command

== Commanders ==
- Gen. C.A. Annibale Bergonzoli (15 October 1939 - 5 January 1941) POW
- Gen. C.A. Alberto Ferrero (15 June 1942 - 10 September 1943)

== Sources ==
- Regio Esercito
