= Sidi Barrani =

Sidi Barrani سيدي براني
- Town
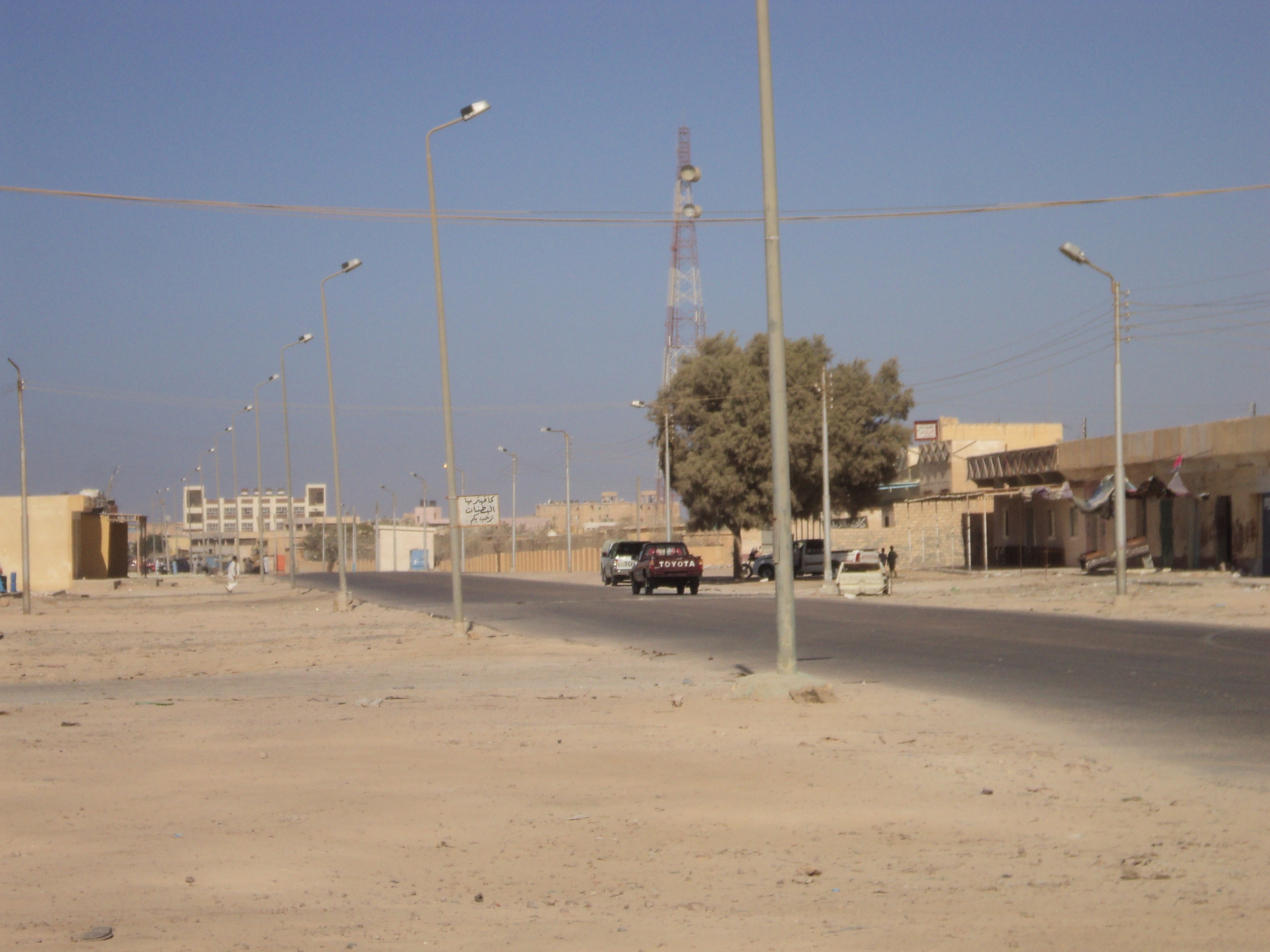

- Location in Egypt
- Coordinates: 31°36′39″N 25°55′32″E
- Country: Egypt
- Governorate: Matruh

Area
  - Total: 1,000 sq mi (2,589 km^{2})
- Elevation: 43 ft (13 m)

Population (2021)
  - Total: 63,098
  - Density: 63.12/sq mi (24.37/km^{2})
- Time zone: UTC+2 (EET)
  - Summer (DST): UTC+3 (EEST)

Sidi Barrani (Arabic: سيدي براني pronounced [ˈsiːdi bɑɾˈɾɑːni]) is a town in Egypt, near the Mediterranean Sea, about 95 km (59 mi) east of the Egypt–Libya border, and around 240 km (150 mi) from Tobruk, Libya.

Named after Sidi es-Saadi el Barrani, a Senussi sheikh who was a head of its Zawiya, the village is mainly a Bedouin community. It has food, gasoline outlets and one small hotel, but virtually no tourist activity or visited historical curiosities. It is the site of an Egyptian Air Force base.

== History ==
Located close to the Roman city of Zygra, in the Roman province of Libya Inferior, Sidi Barrani is often mentioned in historical records to mark the limit of the initial Italian invasion of Egypt from Libya. The Italian Tenth Army built a series of forts in the vicinity.

American Field Service volunteers, providing ambulance services and serving with the British 8th Army were based in the area, in June 1942, 30 miles east of Sidi Barrani.

Sidi Barrani was a destination during the annular solar eclipse on October 3, 2005, as expeditions traveled to the best observation point, Zawiet Mahtallah, 27 km (17 mi) east of Sidi Barrani.

== Climate ==
Köppen-Geiger climate classification system classifies its climate as hot desert (BWh), but it is part of the northern coast of Egypt which has moderated temperatures.

Climate data for Sidi Barrani
| Month | Jan | Feb | Mar | Apr | May | Jun | Jul | Aug | Sep | Oct | Nov | Dec | Year |
|---|---|---|---|---|---|---|---|---|---|---|---|---|---|
| Mean daily maximum °C (°F) | 17.5 (63.5) | 18.1 (64.6) | 19.5 (67.1) | 22.2 (72.0) | 25.1 (77.2) | 27.0 (80.6) | 28.0 (82.4) | 28.7 (83.7) | 28.5 (83.3) | 26.4 (79.5) | 22.9 (73.2) | 18.8 (65.8) | 23.6 (74.4) |
| Daily mean °C (°F) | 12.3 (54.1) | 13.2 (55.8) | 14.2 (57.6) | 16.6 (61.9) | 19.3 (66.7) | 22.0 (71.6) | 23.8 (74.8) | 24.5 (76.1) | 23.5 (74.3) | 20.9 (69.6) | 17.4 (63.3) | 13.6 (56.5) | 18.4 (65.2) |
| Mean daily minimum °C (°F) | 6.9 (44.4) | 7.6 (45.7) | 8.8 (47.8) | 11.2 (52.2) | 13.5 (56.3) | 17.0 (62.6) | 19.6 (67.3) | 20.2 (68.4) | 18.6 (65.5) | 16.0 (60.8) | 12.2 (54.0) | 8.3 (46.9) | 13.3 (56.0) |
| Average rainfall mm (inches) | 41 (1.6) | 19 (0.7) | 13 (0.5) | 5 (0.2) | 3 (0.1) | 0 (0) | 0 (0) | 0 (0) | 1 (0.0) | 21 (0.8) | 18 (0.7) | 42 (1.7) | 163 (6.3) |
| Average relative humidity (%) | 65 | 60 | 64 | 63 | 69 | 72 | 74 | 76 | 70 | 68 | 66 | 67 | 68 |
| Mean daily sunshine hours | 7.0 | 7.4 | 9.0 | 9.9 | 9.9 | 12.3 | 12.7 | 12.2 | 10.9 | 9.7 | 7.3 | 6.8 | 9.6 |
Source: Arab Meteorology Book

== In popular media ==
In Kurt Vonnegut's novel Bluebeard, Sidi Barrani is the site where Dan Gregory (a tormenting magazine illustrator and Nazi sympathizer) was killed on 7 December 1940 during the Battle of Sidi Barrani. The battle continued until 10 December, in which 30,000 British troops defeated almost 80,000 Italian soldiers holding the town.

"Did I ever tell you about the time I was in Sidi Barrani?" was a catchphrase for Kenneth Horne in the BBC radio comedy show Much-Binding-in-the-Marsh which ran from 1944 to 1954 and was initially about life on a mythical Royal Air Force (RAF) station.

Spike Milligan was, according to his memoirs, posted to Sidi Barrani during the Second World War.
