= Umberto Somma =

Italian general

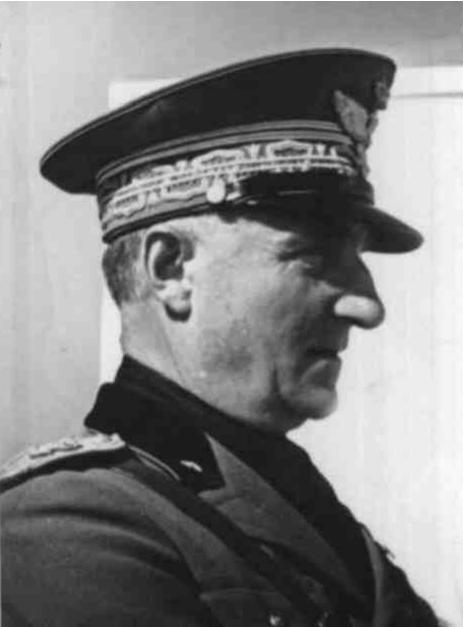
- Born: 20 November 1878; Pistoia, Kingdom of Italy
- Died: 31 December 1955 (aged 77); Rome, Italy
- Military career
- Allegiance: Kingdom of Italy
- Branch: Royal Italian Army
- Rank: Lieutenant General
- Commands: Central Infantry School; 82nd Infantry Regiment "Torino"; 83rd Infantry Regiment “Venezia” Pistoia Military District; 8th Infantry Brigade; 2nd CC.NN. Division "28 Ottobre"; 9th Infantry Division "Pasubio"; XXII Army Corps
- Conflicts: Italo-Turkish War; First Italo-Senussi War; World War I; Battles of the Isonzo; Battle of Caporetto; Second Italo-Ethiopian War; World War II
- Awards: Silver Medal of Military Valor; Bronze Medal of Military Valor; War Merit Cross; Military Order of Savoy; Order of the Crown of Italy; Order of Saints Maurice and Lazarus; Maurician Medal

Umberto Somma (20 November 1878 – 31 December 1955) was an Italian general during the interwar period and World War II. He was also a member of the Italian Senate from 1939 to 1943.

== Biography ==
After joining the Royal Italian Army in 1896, he was promoted to corporal and later sergeant on the following year, and in 1898 he was assigned to the 6th Infantry Regiment. In 1903 he was transferred to the 4th Infantry Regiment, where he was promoted to second lieutenant and later lieutenant. In 1912-1913 he took part in the Italian-Turkish war and then in the First Italo-Senussi War in the staff of the 5th Special Infantry Division, being promoted to the rank of captain and receiving a Bronze Medal of Military Valor.

He then participated as captain and later major in the First World War in the 127th Mobile Infantry Regiment, being seriously wounded in May 1917, while leading an assault on Mount Kuk (for which he was awarded a Silver Medal of Military Valor) during the Tenth Battle of the Isonzo, and later again in November 1917 during the battle of Ragogna (during the retreat that followed the battle of Caporetto), which left him blind in his left eye and with walking problems. He was then hospitalized in Udine and later transferred westwards to avoid capture. After two months, having been promoted to lieutenant colonel for war merits, he returned to service as command of a machine gun unit in Brescia, where he remained until the end of the war. He was then promoted to colonel and made commander of the Central Infantry School and later, from 16 December 1919, of the 82nd Infantry Regiment, until 1924, when he assumed command of the 83rd Infantry Regiment "Venezia".

After a period at the disposal of the Ministry of War, he was promoted to brigadier general and given command of the Military District of Pistoia and then of the 8th Infantry Brigade, stationed in Parma, where he remained from 1929 to 1933, after which he was Inspector of Infantry until 1935. In January 1935, after promotion to major general, he assumed command of the 2nd CC.NN. Division "28 Ottobre", participating at its command in the Second Italo-Ethiopian War, until September 1936. From September 1936 to October 1937 he then commanded the 9th Infantry Division "Pasubio", after which he was attached to the Florence Army Corps (1937-1939) and to the Ministry of War (March–September 1939) and then at the disposal of the Chief of Staff of the Army. After promotion to lieutenant general in March 1939 he assumed command of the XXII Army Corps, stationed in Libya, until 9 June 1940, when he was replaced by Enrico Pitassi Mannella and retired after having reached the age limits, just before Italy's entry into the Second World War.

In the meantime, on 21 December 1939, he had become a member of the Senate of the Kingdom of Italy; within the Senate he was a member, and later secretary, of the Commission for Italian Africa Affairs. On 18 January 1945 the High Court for Sanctions against Fascism stripped him of his Senatorial rank, but this was appealed and annulled in 1948. He died in 1955.
