= Giuseppe Tellera =

General in the Italian Army during World War II

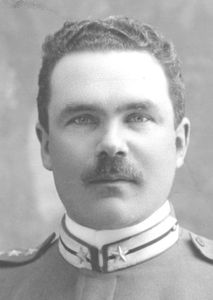
- Born: 14 March 1882; Bologna, Kingdom of Italy
- Died: 7 February 1941 (aged 58); Beda Fomm, Italian Libya
- Military career
- Allegiance: Kingdom of Italy
- Branch: Royal Italian Army
- Service years: 1902–1941
- Rank: Lieutenant General
- Commands: Tenth Army (Italy)
- Conflicts: World War II; North African Campaign; Battle of Beda Fomm (DOW)
- Awards: Gold Medal of Military Valor

Giuseppe Tellera (March 14, 1882 – February 7, 1941) was a general in the Italian Army during World War II.

== Italian Tenth Army ==
On 23 December 1940 General Tellera took over the command of the Italian Tenth Army from Lieutenant General Italo Gariboldi. The Tenth Army was then trying to stop the British Operation Compass, which had begun 9 December with the Attack on Nibeiwa.

At the beginning of the offensive, the Tenth Army consisted of four Army Corps with nine divisions and two brigade-sized armored groups, but by 23 December, the 1st Libyan Division, the 2nd Libyan Division, the 4th CC.NN. Division "3 Gennaio" and the Maletti Group had been destroyed at the Battle of Sidi Barrani. Also, the 1st CC.NN. Division "23 Marzo", the 2nd CC.NN. Division "28 Ottobre", the 62nd Infantry Division "Marmarica", the 63rd Infantry Division "Cirene" and remnants of the 64th Infantry Division "Catanzaro" were encircled at Bardia. That left Tellera with only the 61st Infantry Division "Sirte" and the Babini Group.

Tellera, who had served as a staff officer during the First World War on the Italian front and been the Chief of Staff under General Balbo and Graziani, set out to build up a defence with whatever reinforcements that he received. The 61st Infantry Division "Sirte" was sent to garrison Tobruk, and the rest of the units remained near Gazala. After the British had captured Bardia and Tobruk, Tellera ordered the newly-arrived 60th Infantry Division "Sabratha" to set up a defensive line between Derna and Al Qubbah, and the Special Armored Brigade took up positions at Mechili.

On 24 January 1941, the British 7th Armoured Division dislodged the Special Armored Brigade during the action at Mechili, and the Australian 6th Division attacked the Sabratha on 25 January. On 29 January, Tellera ordered a general retreat along the Via Balbia road towards Benghazi. However, the British Combeforce had already blocked the road at Beda Fomm. The Italians attempted to break out on 6–7 February during the Battle of Beda Fomm and Tellera rode into battle in a M13/40 tank, but the repeated but poorly-coordinated frontal attacks by the Italian armour were futile, and the last remnants of the Tenth Army were forced to surrender.

After the battle, British forces found a gravely injured Tellera in one of the disabled tanks of the VI Tank Battalion M13/40, which he had led personally into a last desperate attack against British forces. He died of wounds in hospital the following day.

Struck by his heroic resistance, the British Army buried him with full military honours in Benghazi.

== Awards and honours ==
For his gallantry in action Lt. Gen. Tellera was posthumously awarded the Medaglia d'oro al valor militare, the highest military decoration in the Italian Army. The award citation read as follows:

“Chief of staff of the Armed Forces North Africa, with organized and active perception, especially in the period that led to the victory of our arms Sidi El Barrani. He took over, in a particularly critical situation, the command of an Army Corps, kept during the forced withdrawal from Cyrenaica Gebel, more serene calm, giving evidence of high-capacity light control and eminent personal worth. In the battle of South Bengasino when the enemy had made impossible the withdrawal of our troops on Agedabia, stopped in a two days fighting, the vehemence of the opponent, and inflict heavy losses, forcing it to desist from its push into Sirtica. Gather the troops remaining in extreme defense in a place of particular importance, he tried repeatedly, with great personal risk, to collect the last means to break through and break the enemy encirclement. In this supreme and heroic effort, fell gloriously on the field, properly sealing a life of dedication to the entire country”. Sidi El Barrani (AS), September 1940-Agedabia, February 6, 1941.
