= Alfonso Ollearo =

Italian general

- Born: 16 December 1885; San Salvatore Monferrato, Kingdom of Italy
- Died: 28 November 1957 (aged 71); Alessandria, Italy
- Military career
- Allegiance: Kingdom of Italy; Italian Social Republic
- Branch: Royal Italian Army; National Republican Army
- Rank: Lieutenant General
- Commands: 5th Artillery Regiment; 2nd Infantry Division Sforzesca; XXII Army Corps
- Conflicts: Italo-Turkish War; First Italo-Senussi War; World War I; Second Italo-Ethiopian War; World War II; Battle of the Western Alps; Greco-Italian War; Italian occupation of France
- Awards: Silver Medal of Military Valor (twice); Bronze Medal of Military Valor (twice); Military Order of Savoy; Order of the Crown of Italy; Order of Saints Maurice and Lazarus; Colonial Order of the Star of Italy

Alfonso Ollearo (16 December 1885 – 28 November 1957) was an Italian general during World War II. He was State Undersecretary for the Army of the Italian Social Republic from December 1943 to June 1944.

== Biography ==
He was born in San Salvatore Monferrato, province of Alessandria, on December 16, 1885, the son of Giovanni Ollearo and Carolina Coggiola. Following family tradition, he pursued a military career and took part in the conquest of Libya with the rank of lieutenant in the 26th Field Artillery Regiment, distinguishing himself in two clashes that took place in 1913, for which he was awarded a Silver Medal of Military Valor. He then participated in the First World War with the 1st Special Mountain Artillery Group, earning a second Silver Medal for Military Valor in 1918.

After promotion to colonel in 1934, he assumed command of the 5th Artillery Regiment, participating in the Second Italo-Ethiopian War at the command of the "Agostini" Column, receiving a bronze medal for military valor for his behavior during the fighting on the Dawa River between 22 and 23 January 1936. He was promoted to brigadier general on January 1, 1937, and in the same year he was assigned to the Ministry of Colonies. On 31 July 1939 he was awarded the Knight's Cross of the Military Order of Savoy.

When the Kingdom of Italy entered the war on 10 June 1940, he assumed command of the 2nd Infantry Division Sforzesca, part of the IV Corps (General Camillo Mercalli) operating within the 4th Army of General Alfredo Guzzoni. During the campaign against France in June 1940, the division was tasked with attacking the forts of Janus and Gondran on the road to Briançon, action which was suspended by the signing of the Armistice of Villa Incisa on 24 June. The division was later transferred to the Greek-Albanian front in January 1941, as part of the XXV Army Corps of General Carlo Rossi, deployed in reserve in the southern sector of the front, around the Tepelenë area. On February 13, 1941, the Greek army launched an offensive along the entire front between Mount Trebeshinë, Mali i Shëndëllisë and Mali i Golicut, in an attempt to capture Vlore. The "Sforzesca" participated in the subsequent bitter defensive fighting, which managed to halt the Greek offensive by late February. After the fall of Greece, in July 1941 the "Sforzesca" returned to Novara. For the merits achieved on the Albanian front, on 15 November 1941 Ollearo was awarded the title of Officer of the Military Order of Savoy.

He was then assigned to the Ministry of War as director of non-commissioned officers and enlisted personnel until August 1942. On 29 October of the same year he was promoted to the rank of lieutenant general, and from 16 August he assumed command of the XXII Army Corps, which had its headquarters in Hyères, near Toulon, within the 4th Army of General Mario Vercellino. At the time of the armistice of Cassibile, the 4th Army was returning to Italy, and disintegrated under the joint attack of German forces from both Italy and France. Ollearo then joined the newly established Italian Social Republic.

From 31 December 1943 to 25 June 1944 he held the position of Undersecretary of the National Republican Army, organizing its headquarters in Rome, with Colonel Vittorio Nebbia as Chief of Staff. At the end of 1943 the seat of the Undersecretariat was transferred from Rome to Asolo, near Treviso. After the end of the war he was purged from tha Army.

He died in Alessandria on November 28, 1957.
