= Enrico Pitassi Mannella =

Italian general during World War II

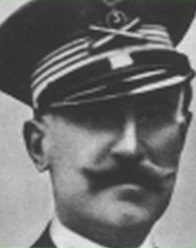
- Born: 31 May 1882; Cerignola, Kingdom of Italy
- Died: 1948 (age 66); Rome, Italy
- Military career
- Allegiance: Kingdom of Italy
- Branch: Royal Italian Army
- Rank: Major General
- Commands: 1st Anti-Aircraft Artillery Center; Artillery Branch Inspectorate; 19th Infantry Division Venezia; XXII Army Corps
- Conflicts: Italo-Turkish War; World War I; Battles of the Isonzo; Battle of Asiago; Second Italo-Ethiopian War; Italian invasion of Albania; World War II; Italian invasion of Egypt; Operation Compass; Battle of Tobruk
- Awards: Silver Medal of Military Valor; Bronze Medal of Military Valor (three times)

Enrico Pitassi Mannella (Cerignola, 31 May 1882 – Rome, 1948) was an Italian general during World War II. An artillery specialist, he was known among his colleagues as the "King of Artillerymen".

== Biography ==
He was born in Cerignola, in the province of Foggia, in 1882, to Giuseppe Pitassi Mannella and Amalia Conti, the third of seventeen children. Also known as Errico, after primary school he attended classical studies in a Jesuit college in Mondragone, in the province of Caserta. At age nineteen, on 3 November 1901, he entered the Royal Military Academy of Artillery and Engineers in Turin, graduating with the rank of artillery second lieutenant, on 21 August 1904. He was promoted to lieutenant after attending the Application School in Turin, and was then assigned to the 24th Field Artillery Regiment; from 14 July 1910 he was assigned to the central artillery school in Nettuno.

He took part in the Italo-Turkish War, where he earned a Silver Medal of Military Valor. He participated in the First World War with the 1st Heavy Field Artillery Regiment, with the rank of captain and later major, being awarded three bronze medals of military valor for actions on Monte Cengio in May and September 1916 and on the heights near Monfalcone on 12 May 1917.

From 30 May 1920 to 15 November 1921, he served as instructor at the central artillery schools of Nettuno and Civitavecchia. After being promoted to lieutenant colonel in 1925, from 24 October 1926 he returned again to the central artillery school, authoring a manual on shooting techniques for artillery officers. In the same year he accompanied Colonel Alessandro Pirzio Biroli on a mission at the military academy of Ecuador and held a series of lectures on technical subjects of artillery in various foreign countries, especially in Spain.

After promotion to colonel in 1929, Mannella was given command of the 1st Anti-Aircraft Artillery Center, and after promotion to brigadier general on 11 March 1935 he commanded the artillery of the 2nd Special Army Corps in East Africa, participating in the Second Italo-Ethiopian War, and entering Addis Ababa on 5 May 1936. From the following 24 May, he returned to Rome, where he remained at the disposal of the Ministry of Italian Africa. From 5 August 1937, he was entrusted the Artillery Branch Inspectorate in Rome and was promoted to Major General. On 30 June 1938 he was appointed commander of the 19th Infantry Division Gavinana in Florence, which in 1939 was renamed 19th Infantry Division Venezia.

At the end of April 1939, Pitassi left for Albania at the head of his Division, remaining there until 9 June 1940. On the following day, which marked Italy's entry into World War II, he was transferred to Libya, where he was given command of the XXII Army Corps, part of the Tenth Army and composed of the 4th Blackshirt Division 3 Gennaio and of the 64th Infantry Division Catanzaro. On 29 June 1940 Mannella was tasked with the investigation into the death of Italo Balbo, governor of Libya, shot down over Tobruk on the evening of the previous day in a friendly fire incident. By the autumn of 1940, the XXII Army Corps had been reduced to only one division, the 61st Infantry Division Sirte, the other divisions having been transferred to other formations.

During the British offensive known as Operation Compass Mannella was given command of the defence of Tobruk; on 22 January 1941 he was captured in the British assault on the town, along with three other generals (Umberto Barberis, Vincenzo della Mura and Adolfo de Leone), Rear Admiral Massimiliano Vietina and over 20,000 of his men. He was sent to a prisoner-of-war camp in Yol, British India and remained in British captivity until after the war, being finally released in 1946. After returning to Italy, he was briefly president of the military court of Rome, and died in Rome in 1948.
