= XXII Army Corps (Italy) =

Italian army formation in World War II

The Italian XXII Army Corps (Italian: XXII Corpo d'Armata) was a formation of the Italian army in World War II.

== History ==
There was a XXII Corps in World War I, which existed between 24 May 1916 and 1 January 1920. The Corps was reformed in Tobruk in Libya on 15 September 1939 and participated in the Italian Invasion of Egypt as part of the Italian 10th Army. After the defeat at the Battle of Sidi Barrani, XXII Corps took up defensive positions at Tobruk. On 21 January 1941, the British attacked Tobruk and by the afternoon of 23 January, the last Italian nuclei of resistance surrendered. Also on this date, the XXII Corps was considered disbanded.

On 10 May 1942, a new XXII Corps was formed in Veneto to control the border with Yugoslavia. In September 1942, the Corps was transferred to Piedmont and on 11 November, following the Anglo-American landing in French North Africa, the XXII Corps crossed the Italian-French armistice line and occupied Nice. It remained as an occupation force in a large part of the Provence, until the Armistice of Cassibile of 10 September 1943, when the Corps was disarmed by the Germans and disbanded.

== Composition ==
=== Spring 1940 ===
- 64th Infantry Division "Catanzaro"
- 4th CC.NN. Division "3 Gennaio"

=== Autumn 1940 ===
- 61st Infantry Division "Sirte"

=== 1942 ===
- 136th Armored Legionary Division "Centauro"
- 2nd Cavalry Division "Emanuele Filiberto Testa di Ferro"
- 7th Infantry Division "Lupi di Toscana"
- 48th Infantry Division "Taro"
- 10th Infantry Division "Piave"
- 103rd Infantry Division "Piacenza"
- 104th Infantry Division "Mantova"

=== 1943 ===
- 48th Infantry Division "Taro"
- Command Fortress Toulon

== Commanders ==
- Gen. C.A. Umberto Somma (1939.09.15 – 1940.06.08)
- Gen. C.A. Enrico Pitassi Mannella (1940.06.09 – 1941.01.23 : POW)
- Gen. D. Federico Ferrari Orsi (1942.05.10 – 1942.08.10)
- Gen. B. Romolo Borelli (interim)
- Gen. C.A. Alfonso Ollearo (1942.08.16 – 1943.09.08)
