= First Italo-Senussi War =

1911–1917 war

The First Italo-Senussi War (1911–17) was a conflict between the Kingdom of Italy and the Senussi for control of Libya, primarily in Cyrenaica. It had two main active phases:

- The Italo-Turkish War (1911–12), when Italy invaded Libya, then the Ottoman vilayet of Trâblus Gârb
- The Senussi campaign (1915–17), part of World War I, in which Italian and British forces fought the Ottoman- and German-supported Senussi

After a period of relative peace, the Second Italo-Senussi War broke out in 1923 and lasted until 1932.
