= 2nd CC.NN. Division "28 Ottobre" =

Italian CC.NN. (Blackshirts militia) division

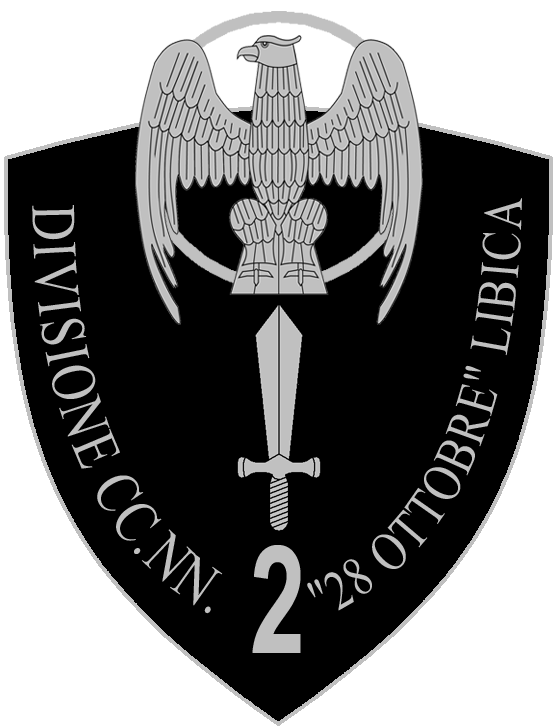
- 2nd CC.NN. Division "28 Ottobre" insignia
- Active: 10 May 1935 – 5 January 1941
- Country: Italy
- Branch: MVSN
- Type: Infantry
- Size: Division
- Garrison/HQ: Naples
- Motto: "Summa audacia et virtus"
- Engagements: Second Italo-Ethiopian War; World War II

Insignia
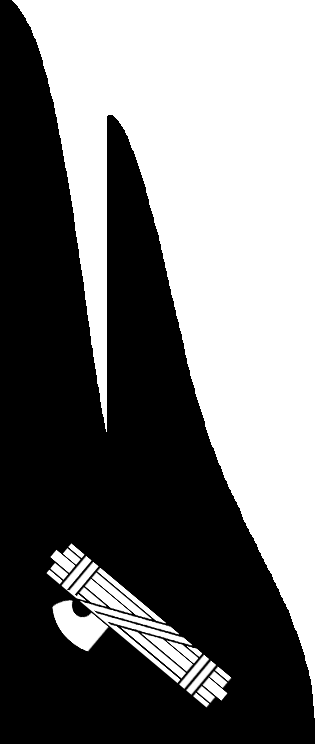
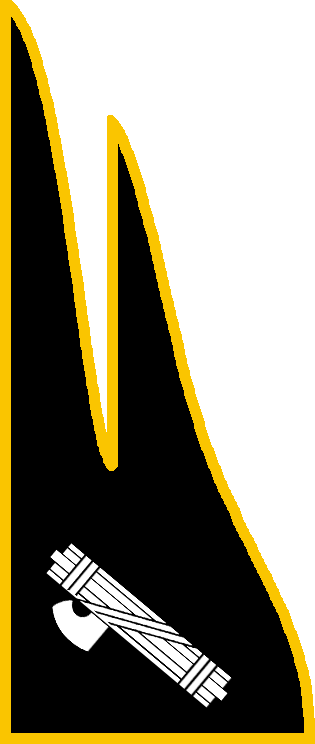
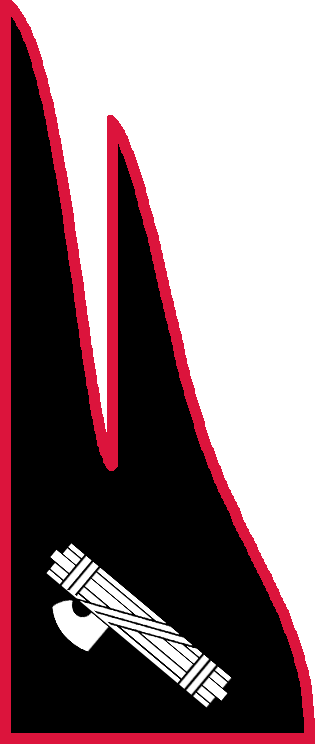
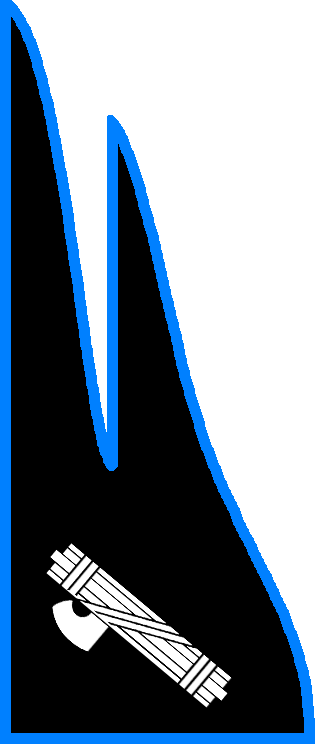
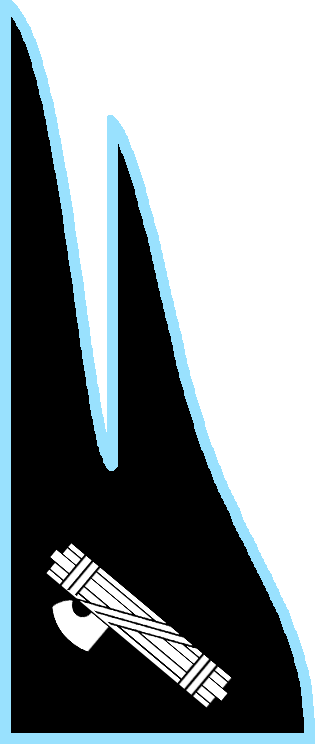
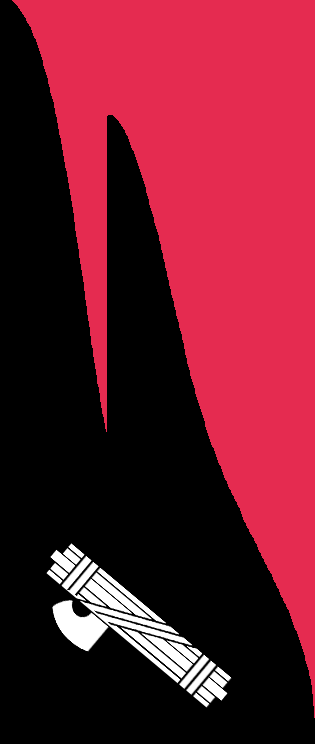
- Identification symbol: 2nd CC.NN. Division gorget patches

The 2nd CC.NN. Division "28 Ottobre" (Italian: 2ª Divisione CC.NN. "28 Ottobre") was an Italian CC.NN. (Blackshirts militia) division raised on 10 May 1935 for the Second Italo-Ethiopian War against Ethiopia. The name "28 Ottobre" ("28 October") was chosen to commemorate the Fascist March on Rome on 28 October 1922. The division took part in the Italian invasion of Egypt and was destroyed during the Battle of Bardia in January 1941.

== History ==
The division was one of six CC.NN. divisions raised in summer 1935 in preparation for the Second Italo-Ethiopian War. Its members were volunteers from the various armed militias of the National Fascist Party's paramilitary wing and came from four regions: the 114th and 116th CC.NN. legions from Lombardy, the 180th CC.NN. Legion from the Emilia-Romagna, Lombardy, and Piedmont, and the II CC.NN. Machine Gun Battalion from Liguria.

=== Second Italo-Ethiopian War ===
The division assembled in Italian Eritrea on 18 September 1935 and moved to Senafe on the border with Ethiopia. The division participated in the Second Battle of Tembien. After the war the division was repatriated and then disbanded.

=== World War II ===
The division was reformed in Naples in 1939 and sent with three other CC.NN. divisions to Italian Libya. The division took part in the invasion of Egypt in September 1940, reaching Sallum in Egypt by October. Heavily invested by British forces during Operation Compass the division retreated to Bardia, where it was encircled with other Italian units. After a short siege the division was destroyed during the Battle of Bardia on 3–5 January 1941.

== Organization ==
=== Second Italo-Ethiopian War ===
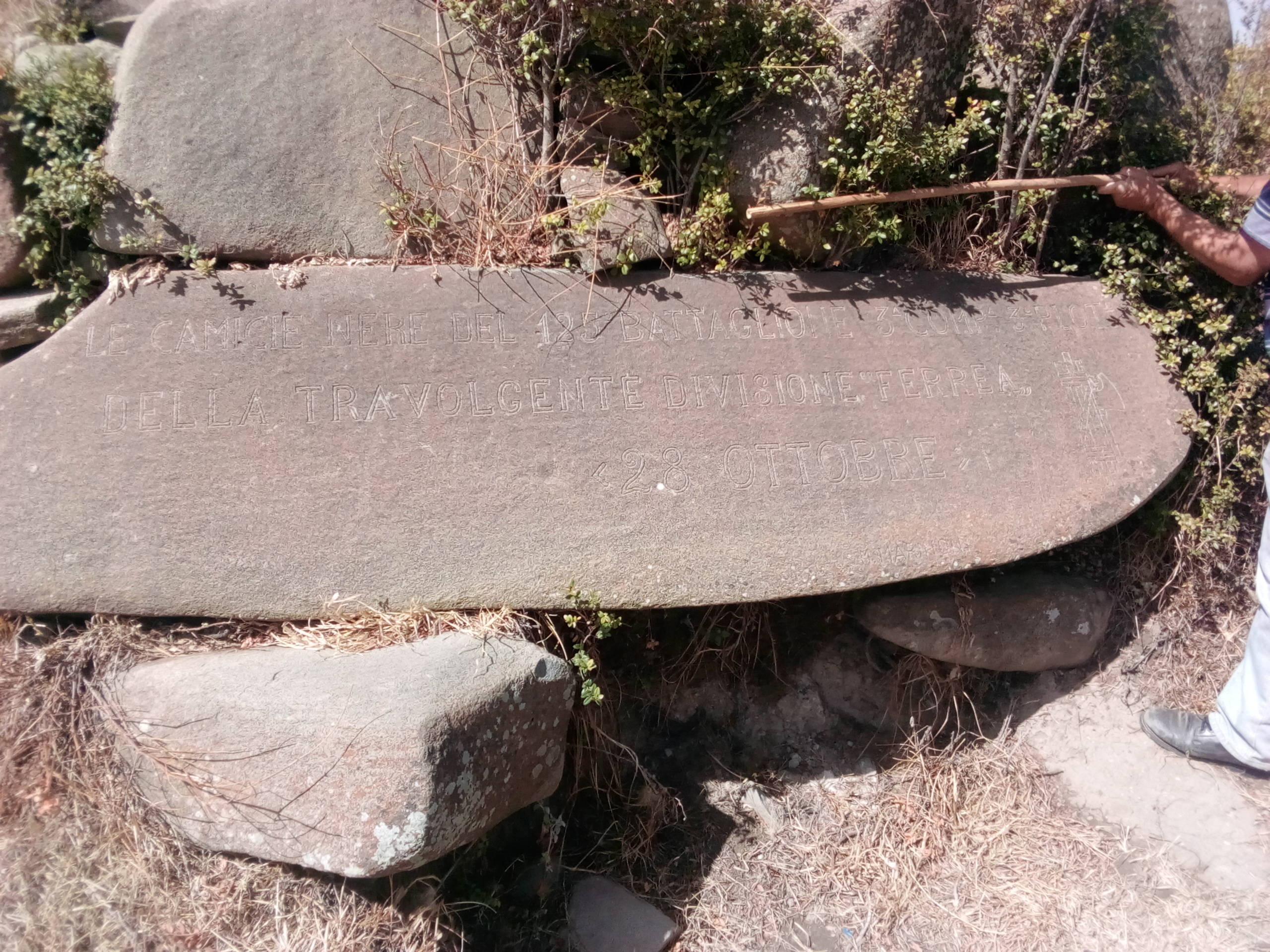
Memorial stone for the CXXV CC.NN. Battalion, in Haddinnet, Ethiopia

Below follows the division's organization during the Second Italo-Ethiopian War and the cities, in which its CC.NN. battalions and companies/batteries were raised.

- 2nd CC.NN. Division "28 Ottobre"
  - 114th CC.NN. Legion "Garibaldina", in Bergamo
    - Command Company
    - CXIV CC.NN. Battalion, in Bergamo
    - CXV CC.NN. Battalion, in Brescia
    - 114th CC.NN. Machine Gun Company, in Milan, Lodi and Pavia
    - 114th CC.NN. Artillery Battery, Piacenza (65/17 mod. 13 mountain guns)
  - 116th CC.NN. Legion "Alpina", in Como
    - Command Company
    - CXVI CC.NN. Battalion, in Como
    - CXXV CC.NN. Battalion, in Brescia and Monza
    - 116th CC.NN. Machine Gun Company, in Como and Varese
    - 116th CC.NN. Artillery Battery, Milan (65/17 mod. 13 mountain guns)
  - 180th CC.NN. Legion "Alessandro Farnese", in Parma
    - Command Company
    - CLXXIV CC.NN. Battalion, in Fidenza
    - CLXXX CC.NN. Battalion, in Parma
    - 180th CC.NN. Machine Gun Company, in Cremona and Casalmaggiore
    - 180th CC.NN. Artillery Battery, in Alessandria and Tortona (65/17 mod. 13 mountain guns)
  - II CC.NN. Machine Gun Battalion, in Genova and Savona
  - II Artillery Group (65/17 mod. 13 mountain guns, Royal Italian Army)
  - II Mixed Transport Unit (Royal Italian Army)
  - II Supply Unit (Royal Italian Army)
  - 2x CC.NN. replacement battalions
  - 2nd Special Engineer Company (Mixed CC.NN. and Royal Italian Army)
  - 2nd Medical Section (Royal Italian Army)
  - 2nd Logistic Section (Royal Italian Army)
  - 2nd Carabinieri Section

The supply unit had 1,600 mules and the mixed transport unit 80 light trucks. The division engaged in war crimes in Ethiopia during the Second Italo-Ethiopian War. The CXXV CC.NN. Battalion left a monumental stone' in Dogu'a Tembien, a metres-wide phonolite with inscriptions. It is located on top of the Dabba Selama mountain, and was carved by soldiers that participated in the First Battle of Tembien.

=== World War II ===
2nd CC.NN. Division "28 Ottobre" organization

Below follows the division's organization at the start of the Italian invasion of Egypt and the cities, in which its CC.NN. battalions were raised:

- 2nd CC.NN. Division "28 Ottobre"
  - Headquarters
    - Command Company
    - 703rd Carabinieri Section
    - 704th Carabinieri Section
    - 302nd Field Post Office
  - 231st CC.NN. Legion, in Sulmona
    - Command Company
    - CXXXI CC.NN. Battalion "G. Paolini", in Sulmona
    - CXXXII CC.NN. Battalion "Monte Velino", in Avezzano
    - CXXXV CC.NN. Battalion "Gran Sasso", in Teramo
    - 231st CC.NN. Machine Gun Company
  - 238th CC.NN. Legion, in Naples
    - Command Company
    - CXXXVIII CC.NN. Battalion "R. Padovani", in Naples
    - CXL CC.NN. Battalion "L'Aquila", in Salerno
    - CXLV CC.NN. Battalion "Pisacane", in Castellammare di Stabia
    - 238th CC.NN. Machine Gun Company
  - 202nd Artillery Regiment "28 Ottobre" (formed by depot of the 4th Artillery Regiment "Bergamo" in Villa Vicentina)
    - Command Unit
    - I Group (75/27 mod. 06 field guns; formed by depot of the 4th Artillery Regiment "Bergamo" in Villa Vicentina)
    - II Group (75/27 mod. 06 field guns; formed by depot of the 3rd Army Corps Artillery Regiment in Cremona)
    - III Group (100/17 mod. 14 howitzers; formed by depot of the 8th Army Corps Artillery Regiment in Rome)
    - 2nd Anti-aircraft Battery (20/65 mod. 35 anti-aircraft guns; formed by depot of the 2nd Anti-aircraft Artillery Regiment in Naples)
    - 202nd Anti-aircraft Battery (20/65 mod. 35 anti-aircraft guns; formed by depot of the 2nd Anti-aircraft Artillery Regiment in Naples)
    - 231st Support Weapons Battery (65/17 mod. 13 mountain guns; formed by depot of the 4th Artillery Regiment "Bergamo" in Villa Vicentina)
    - 238th Support Weapons Battery (65/17 mod. 13 mountain guns; formed by depot of the 4th Artillery Regiment "Bergamo" in Villa Vicentina)
    - Ammunition and Supply Unit
  - CCII Machine Gun Battalion (Royal Italian Army)
  - CCII Mixed Engineer Battalion (Royal Italian Army)
    - Command Platoon
    - 1 × Engineer Company
    - 1 × Telegraph and Radio Operators Company
    - 1 × Searchlight Section
  - 202nd CC.NN. Anti-tank Company (47/32 mod. 35 anti-tank guns)
  - 202nd CC.NN. Support Weapons Battery (65/17 mod. 13 mountain guns)
  - 202nd CC.NN. Mortar Company (81mm mod. 35 mortars)
  - 202nd Medical Section (Royal Italian Army)
    - 3 × Field hospitals
    - 1 × Surgical Unit
  - 202nd Supply Section (Royal Italian Army)
  - 202nd Transport Section (Royal Italian Army)

Attached during the Battle of Sollum:

- XX Tank Battalion L (L3/33 and L3/35 tankettes, Royal Italian Army)

== Commanding officers ==
During the Second Italo-Ethiopian War:

- Generale di Divisione Umberto Somma (1 May 1935 – 1 September 1936)

During the Italian invasion of Egypt:

- Generale di Divisione Francesco Argentino (1939 – 5 January 1941, POW)

== Sources ==
- Lucas, Ettore; Giorgio de Vecchi (1976). Storia delle Unità Combattenti della MVSN 1923-1943. Giovanni Volpe Editore. pp. 63–116 plus errata.
- Madej, W., V., Italian Army Order of Battle, 1939–1943, 1981, Allentown, PA.
- Madej, W., V., Italian Army Order of Battle: 1940–44, 1990, Allentown, PA.
