= 61st Infantry Division "Sirte" =

Infantry division of the Royal Italian Army during World War II

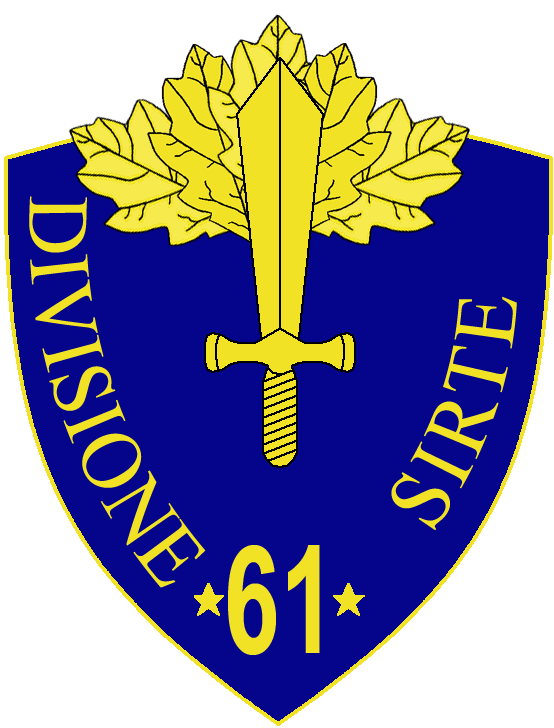
- 61st Infantry Division "Sirte" insignia
- Active: 1937 – 1941
- Disbanded: 23 January 1941
- Country: Kingdom of Italy
- Branch: Royal Italian Army
- Type: Infantry
- Size: Division
- Garrison/HQ: Misrata
- Engagements: World War II North African Campaign

Commanders
- Notable commanders: Vincenzo della Mura

Insignia
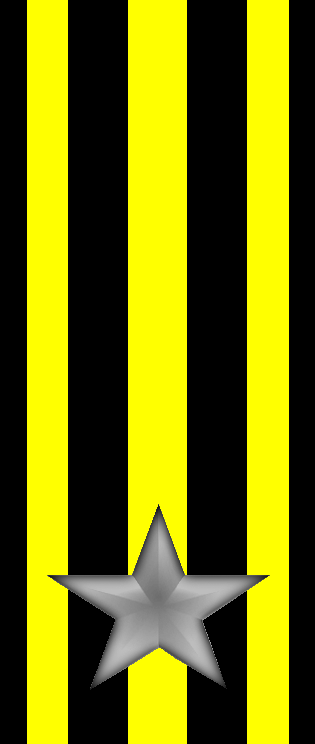
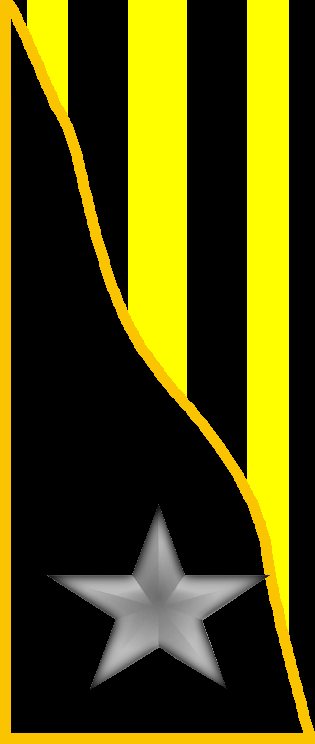
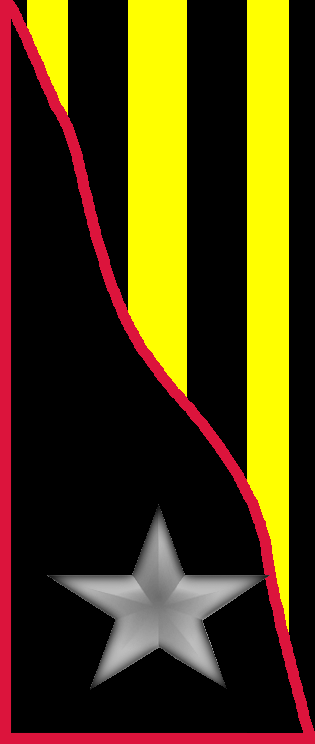
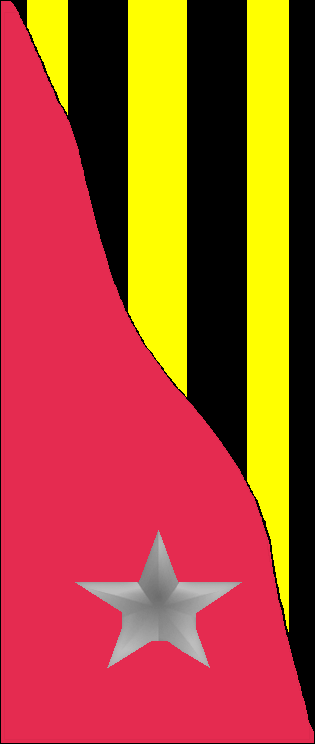
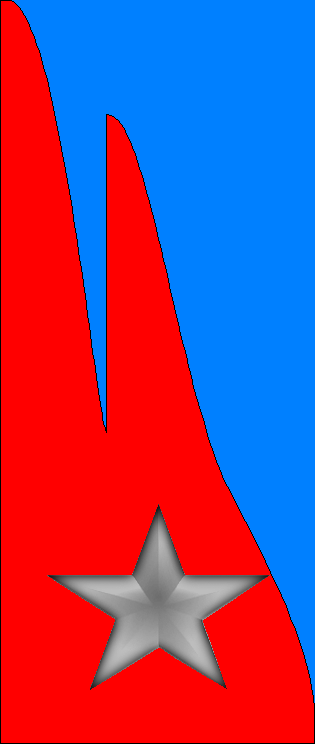
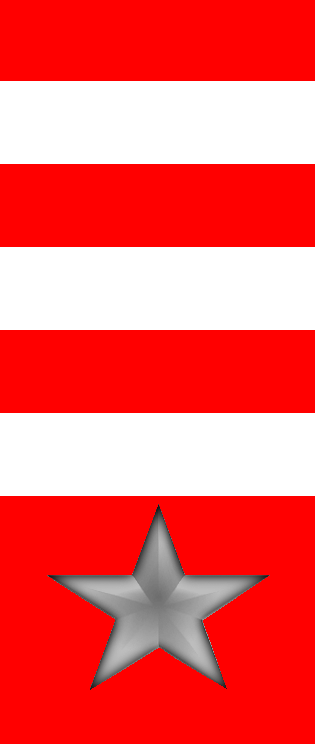
- Identification symbol: Sirte Division gorget patches

The 61st Infantry Division "Sirte" (Italian: 61ª Divisione di fanteria "Sirte") was an infantry division of the Royal Italian Army during World War II. The division was formed on 9 May 1937 in Misrata in Italian Libya and named for the Libyan city of Sirte. The division's regimental depots were in mainland Italy in Calabria and shared with the 27th Infantry Division "Brescia", with both divisions recruiting their troops from and training them there. The division was destroyed on 22 January 1941 during the British capture of Tobruk and officially declared lost on 23 January 1941. The Sirte was classified as an auto-transportable division, meaning it had some motorized transport, but not enough to move the entire division at once.

== History ==
The division's lineage begins with the Brigade "Ancona" established on 1 August 1862 with the 69th and 70th infantry regiments. The brigade fought on the Italian front in World War I.

On 10 November 1926 the brigade command and the 69th Infantry Regiment were disbanded, while the 70th Infantry Regiment "Ancona" was transferred to the XIX Infantry Brigade.

On 9 May 1937 the 61st Infantry Division "Sirte" was activated in Misrata in Libya and the 70th Infantry Regiment "Ancona" left the 19th Infantry Division "Gavinana" in Tuscany and was transferred to Libya to join the Sirte. On the same day the 69th Infantry Regiment "Ancona" was reformed in Trieste by the 12th Infantry Division "Timavo" with two battalions ceded by the 151st Infantry Regiment "Sassari" and 152nd Infantry Regiment "Sassari", and elements of the 12th Infantry Regiment "Casale". The 69th Infantry Regiment "Ancona" and the reactivated 43rd Artillery Regiment were then transferred to Libya to join the Sirte.

The division's major units were:

- 61st Infantry Division "Sirte", in Misrata
  - 69th Infantry Regiment "Ancona", in Tarhuna
  - 70th Infantry Regiment "Ancona", in Misrata
  - 43rd Artillery Regiment, in Al-Khums

In 1939 the division's three regiments were renamed "Sirte".

=== World War II ===
During the Italian invasion of France from 10-25 June 1940 the Sirte was deployed along the French Tunisian-Libyan border. After the signing of the Franco-Italian Armistice signed on 24 June 1940 the Sirte returned to its garrison in Misrata.

In September 1940 the Sirte entered the XXII Army Corps and tasked to protect the supply lines of the Italian 10th Army's for the upcoming Italian invasion of Egypt. At the start of the British Operation Compass on 9 December 1940 the Sirte was deployed along the road between Gazala and Fort Capuzzo. By 7 January 1941, the division was encircled by British forces in Tobruk and subject to heavy bombardment. The division was overrun on 21-22 January 1941 during the British capture of Tobruk.

== Organization ==
61st Infantry Division "Sirte" organization in 1940

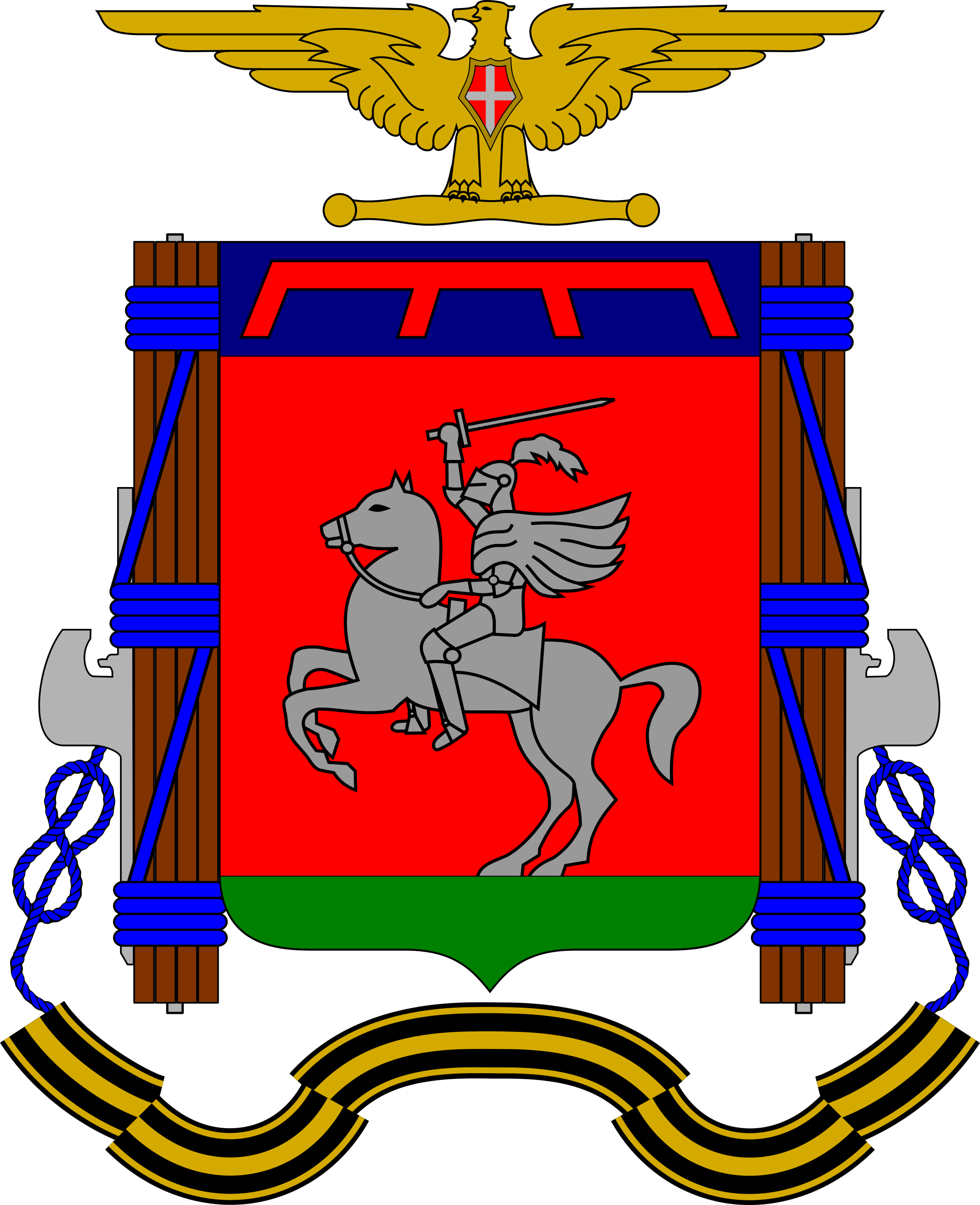
Coat of Arms of the 69th Infantry Regiment "Ancona", 1939

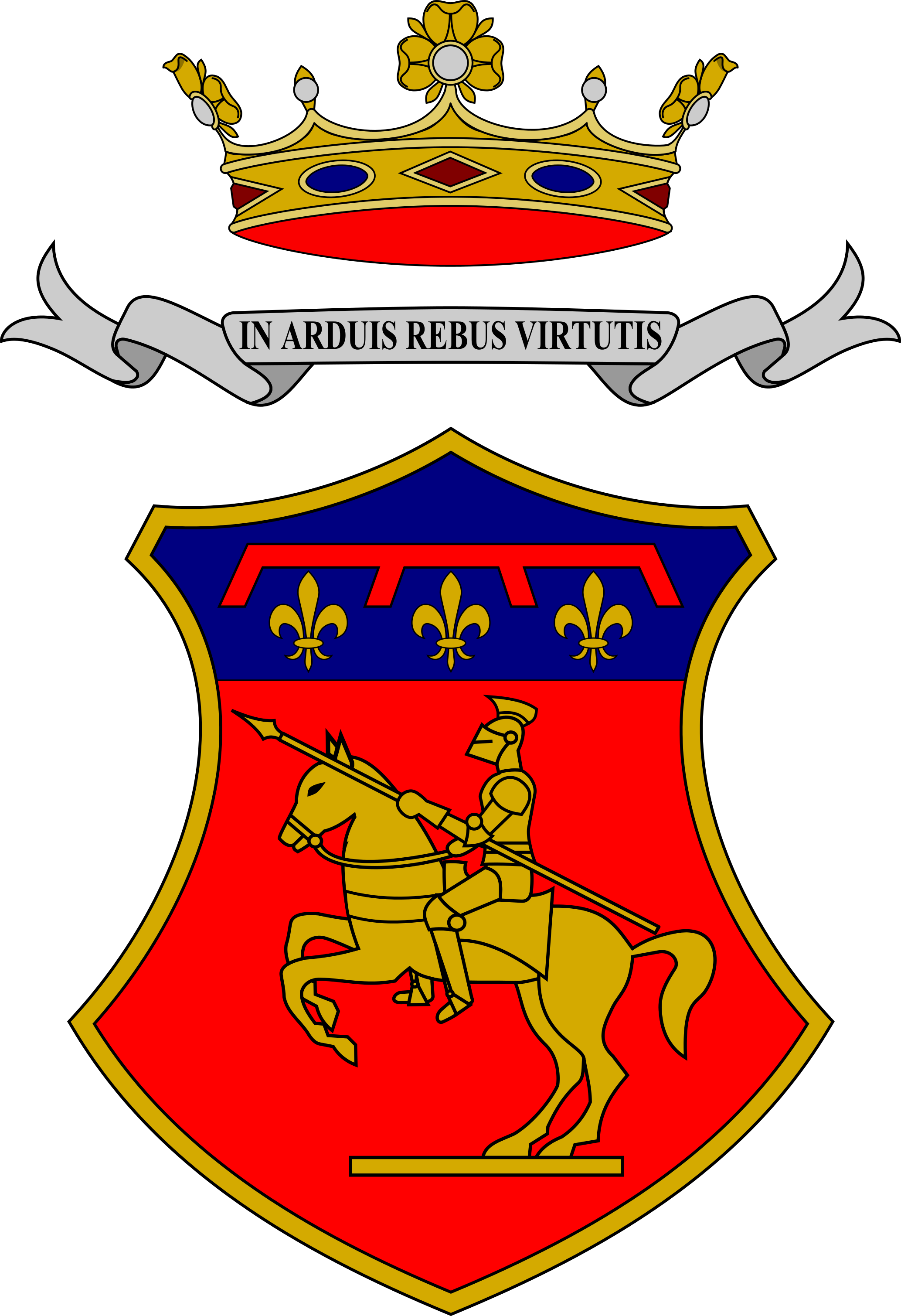
Coat of Arms of the 70th Infantry Regiment "Ancona", 1939

- 61st Infantry Division "Sirte"
  - Headquarters
    - Command Company
    - 1st Carabinieri Section
    - 261st Field Post Office
    - 61st Infantry Division Command Transport Squad
  - 69th Infantry Regiment "Sirte" (Note: Named 69th Infantry Regiment "Ancona" until 1939 when the army reorganized its divisions as binary divisions and divisional infantry regiments took the name of the division.)
    - Command Company
    - 3 × Fusilier battalions
    - Support Weapons Battery (65/17 mod. 13 infantry support guns)
    - Mortar Company (81mm mod. 35 mortars)
  - 70th Infantry Regiment "Sirte" (Note: Named 70th Infantry Regiment "Ancona" until 1939 when the army reorganized its divisions as binary divisions and divisional infantry regiments took the name of the division.)
    - Command Company
    - 3 × Fusilier battalions
    - Support Weapons Battery (65/17 mod. 13 infantry support guns)
    - Mortar Company (81mm mod. 35 mortars)
  - 43rd Artillery Regiment "Sirte"
    - Command Unit
    - I Group (75/27 mod. 06 field guns; formed by the depot of the 3rd Artillery Regiment "Fossalta", re-equipped with 100/17 mod. 14 howitzers)
    - II Group (75/27 mod. 06 field guns; formed by the depot of the 9th Artillery Regiment "Brennero")
    - III Group (75/27 mod. 06 field guns; formed by the depot of the 23rd Artillery Regiment "Timavo")
    - 61st Anti-aircraft Battery (20/65 mod. 35 anti-aircraft guns)
    - 261st Anti-aircraft Battery (20/65 mod. 35 anti-aircraft guns)
    - Ammunition and Supply Unit
  - LXI Tank Battalion L (L3/35 tankettes)
  - LXI Machine Gun Battalion
  - LXI Mixed Engineer Battalion
    - 61st Telegraph and Radio Operators Company
    - 1 × Engineer Company
    - 1 × Searchlight Section
  - LXI Replacements Battalion
  - 61st Bersaglieri Motorcyclists Company
  - 61st Anti-tank Company (47/32 mod. 35 anti-tank guns)
  - 61st Transport Unit
  - 1 × Medical Section
    - 2 × Field hospitals
    - 1 × Surgical unit
  - 1 × Supply Section

== Commanding officers ==
The division's commanding officers were:

- Generale di Divisione Alberto Barbieri (9 May 1937 - 1938)
- Generale di Divisione Eduardo Quarra Sito (1939 - 16 August 1939)
- Generale di Brigata Valentino Babini (17 August 1939 - 9 June 1940)
- Generale di Divisione Vincenzo Della Mura (10 June 1940 - 23 January 1941, POW)
