= Western Desert campaign =

Campaign fought in Libya and Egypt during WWII

- Part of the North African campaign of the Second World War
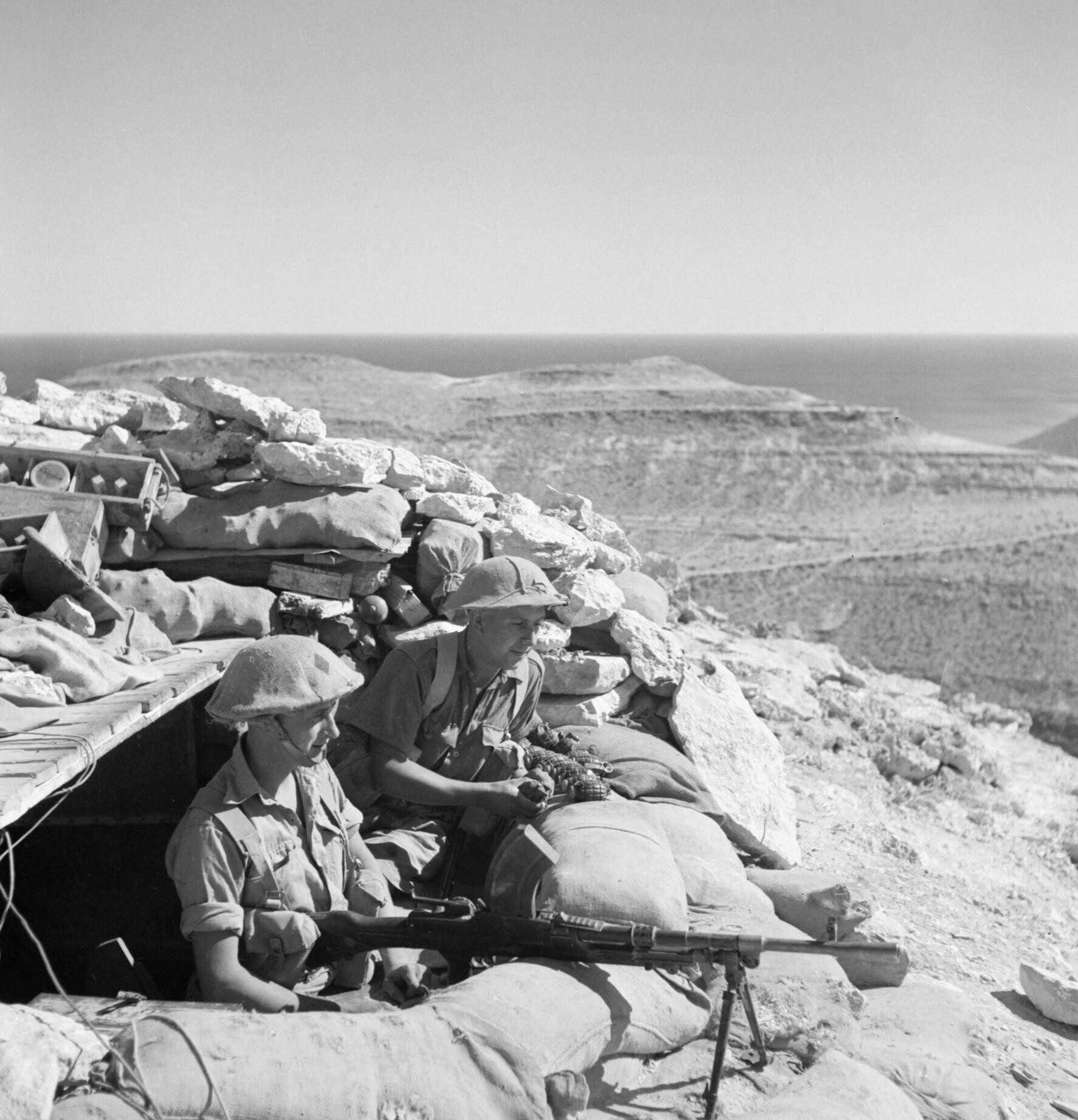
- British lookouts during the Siege of Tobruk, August 1941
Date	11 June 1940 – 4 February 1943; (2 years, 7 months, 3 weeks and 3 days)
Location	Western Desert, Egypt and Libya 24°N 25°E
Result	Allied victory

Belligerents
United Kingdom; India; Sudan; Southern Rhodesia; Palestine; Transjordan; Libyan Arab Force; Australia; New Zealand; South Africa; Free France; Greece; (Kingdom of Yugoslavia) Yugoslavia; United States (Air support)	Italy; Libya; Germany

Commanders and leaders
Archibald Wavell; Claude Auchinleck; Harold Alexander; Alan Cunningham; Neil Ritchie; Bernard Montgomery	Ugo Cavallero; Italo Balbo †; Rodolfo Graziani; Italo Gariboldi; Ettore Bastico; Curio Barbasetti; Albert Kesselring; Erwin Rommel; Georg Stumme †

Casualties and losses
North Africa; 220,000; 35,476 killed	North Africa; 620,000; 32,342 killed

The Western Desert campaign (Desert War) took place in the deserts of Egypt and Libya and was the main theatre in the North African campaign of the Second World War. Military operations began in June 1940 with the Italian declaration of war and the Italian invasion of Egypt from Libya in September. Operation Compass, a five-day raid by the British in December 1940, was so successful that it led to the destruction of the Italian 10th Army (10ª Armata) over the following two months. Benito Mussolini sought help from Adolf Hitler, who sent a small German force to Tripoli under Directive 22 (11 January). The Afrika Korps (Generalleutnant Erwin Rommel) was formally under Italian command, as Italy was the main Axis power in the Mediterranean and North Africa.

In the spring of 1941, Rommel led Operation Sonnenblume, that pushed the Allies back to Egypt, except for the siege of Tobruk at the port. At the end of 1941, Axis forces were defeated in Operation Crusader and retired again to El Agheila. In early 1942 Axis forces drove the Allies back again, then captured Tobruk after the Battle of Gazala but failed to destroy their opponents. The Axis invaded Egypt and the Allies retreated to El Alamein, where the Eighth Army fought two defensive battles, then defeated the Axis forces in the Second Battle of El Alamein in October 1942. The Eighth Army drove Axis forces out of Libya to Tunisia, which was invaded from the west by the Allied First Army in Operation Torch. In the Tunisian campaign the remaining Axis forces surrendered to the combined Allied forces in May 1943.

The British Western Desert Force (renamed Cyrenaica Command (CYRCOM) and later the Eighth Army) had been reduced in early 1941 to send units to Greece, rather than complete the conquest of Libya, just as German troops and Italian reinforcements arrived. British Commonwealth and Empire troops released after the conclusion of the East Africa Campaign were sent to Egypt and by summer, the surviving Commonwealth troops had returned from Greece, Crete and Syria. From the end of 1941, increasing amounts of equipment and personnel, including US supplies and tanks, arrived for the Eighth Army. The Axis never overcame the supply constraints limiting the size of their land and air forces in North Africa and the desert war became a sideshow for Germany, when the expected quick conclusion of Operation Barbarossa, the invasion of the Soviet Union, was not achieved.

== Background ==
=== Libya ===
Cyrenaica (Libya) had been an Italian colony since the Italo-Turkish War in 1911–1912. With Tunisia, part of French North Africa, to the west, and Egypt to the east, the Italians prepared to defend both fronts through a North Africa Supreme Headquarters, under the command of the Governor-General of Italian Libya, Marshal of the Air Force, Italo Balbo. Supreme Headquarters had the 5th Army (General Italo Gariboldi) and the 10th Army (General Mario Berti), which in mid-1940 had nine metropolitan divisions of about 13,000 men each, three Milizia Volontaria per la Sicurezza Nazionale (Blackshirt) divisions and two Libyan divisions, each with an establishment with 8,000 men. Italian army divisions had been reorganised in the late 1930s from three regiments each to two; reservists were recalled in 1939, along with the usual call-up of conscripts.

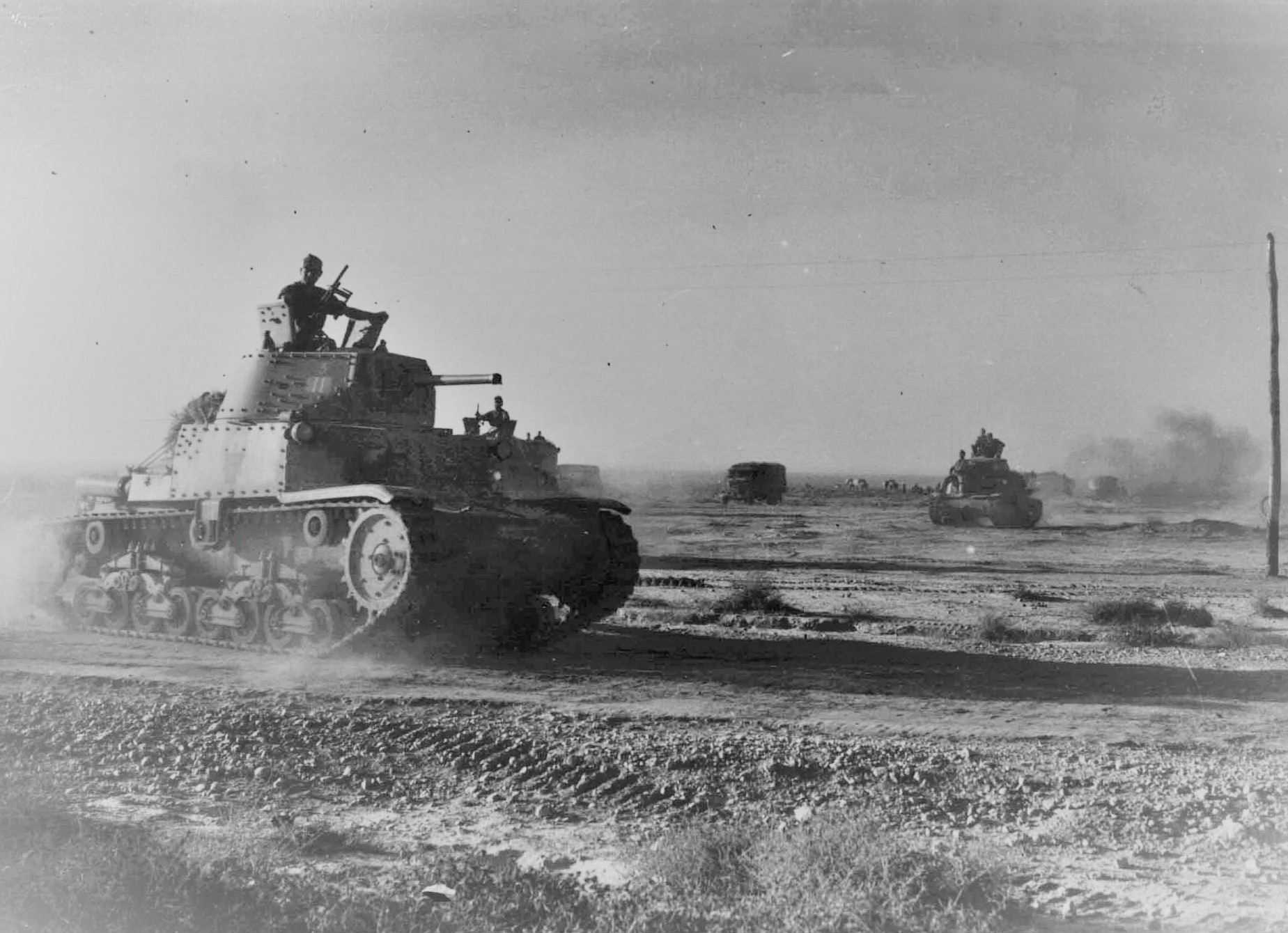
132nd Armored Division "Ariete" attacks

Morale was considered high and the army had recent operational experience. The Italian navy had prospered under the Fascist regime, which had paid for fast, well-built, well-armed ships and a large submarine fleet but it lacked experience and training. The air force had been ready for war in 1936 but by 1939 had stagnated; the British did not consider it capable of maintaining a high rate of operations. The 5th Army, with eight divisions, was based in Tripolitania, the western half of Libya, opposite Tunisia and the 10th Army, with six infantry divisions, held Cyrenaica in the east. When war was declared, the 10th Army sent the 1st Libyan Division to the Egyptian frontier from Giarabub to Sidi Omar and XXI Corps from Sidi Omar to the coast, Bardia and Tobruk. The XXII Corps moved south-west of Tobruk to act as a counter-attack force.

=== Egypt ===
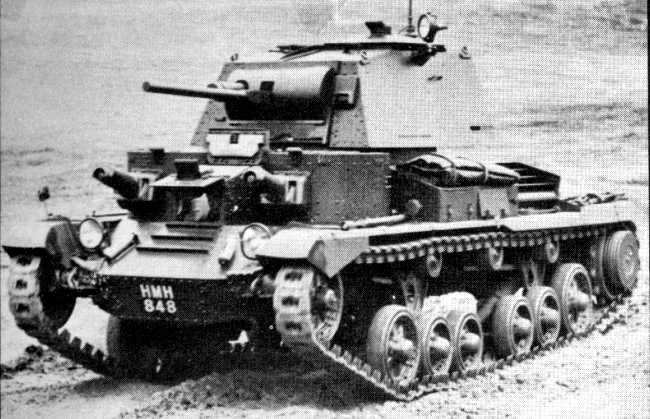
Cruiser Tank Mk I (A9)

The British had based forces in Egypt since 1882 but these were greatly reduced by the terms of the Anglo-Egyptian treaty of 1936. The small British and Commonwealth force garrisoned the Suez Canal and the Red Sea route. The canal was vital to British communications with its Far Eastern and Indian Ocean territories. In mid-1939, Lieutenant-General Archibald Wavell was appointed General Officer Commanding-in-Chief (GOC-in-C) of the new Middle East Command, over the Mediterranean and Middle East theatres. Until the Franco-Axis armistice, French divisions in Tunisia faced the Italian 5th Army on the western Libyan border. In Libya, the Royal Army had about 215,000 men and in Egypt, the British had about 36,000 troops and another 27,500 men training in Palestine.

2nd Cameron Highlanders training at Mena Camp near Giza, Egypt on 4 June 1940

British forces included the Mobile Division (Egypt) under Major-General Percy Hobart, one of only two British armoured training formations. In mid-1939 it was renamed the Armoured Division (Egypt) and on 16 February 1940, it became the 7th Armoured Division. The Egypt–Libya border was defended by the Egyptian Frontier Force and in June 1940, the headquarters of the 6th Infantry Division under Major-General Richard O'Connor took command in the Western Desert, with instructions to drive back the Italians from their frontier posts and dominate the hinterland if war began. The 7th Armoured Division, less the 7th Armoured Brigade, assembled at Mersa Matruh (now Marsa Matruh) and sent the 7th Support Group forward towards the frontier as a covering force, where the RAF also moved most of its bombers. Malta was also reinforced.

The HQ of the 6th Infantry Division, which lacked complete and fully trained units, was renamed the Western Desert Force on 17 June. In Tunisia, the French had eight divisions, capable only of limited operations and in Syria, three poorly armed and trained divisions, about 40,000 troops and border guards, on occupation duties against the civilian population. Italian land and air forces in Libya greatly outnumbered the British in Egypt but suffered from poor morale and were handicapped by inferior equipment. In Italian East Africa, there were another 130,000 Italian and African troops with 400 guns, 200 light tanks and 20,000 lorries. Italy declared war on 11 June 1940.

== Prelude ==
=== Terrain ===
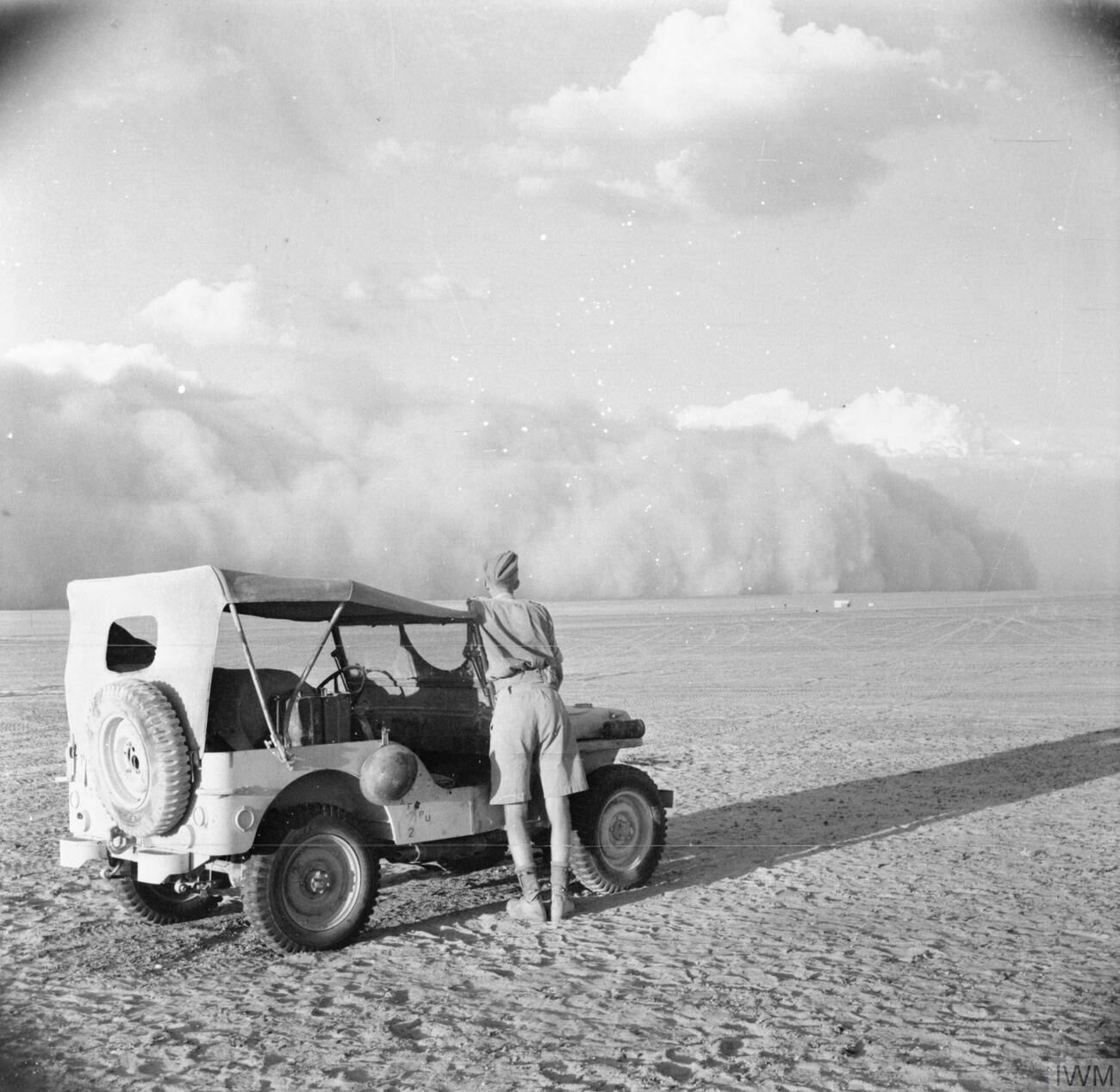
Ghibli approaches.

Until 1943 the war was fought in the Western Desert, which was about 240 mi (390 km) wide, from Marsa Matruh in Egypt to Gazala on the Libyan coast, along Litoranea Balbo (Via Balbia), the only paved road. The Sand Sea, 150 mi (240 km) inland, marked the southern limit of the desert at its widest points at Giarabub and Siwa. In British parlance, the term "Western Desert" applied to the desert of Egypt west of the Nile but also came to describe eastern Cyrenaica in Libya. From the coast, a raised, flat plain of stony desert extends inland about 500 ft (150 m) above sea level and runs south for 120–190 mi (200–300 km) from the coast to the edge of the Sand Sea. Scorpions, vipers and flies abound in the region, which was inhabited by a small number of Bedouin nomads.

Bedouin tracks linked wells and the more easily traversed ground; navigation was by sun, star, compass and "desert sense", good perception of the environment gained by experience. When Italian troops advanced into Egypt in September 1940, the Maletti Group got lost leaving Sidi Omar, disappeared and had to be found by aircraft. In spring and summer the days are miserably hot and the nights very cold. The sirocco (gibleh or ghibli), a hot desert wind, blows clouds of fine sand, which reduce visibility to a few metres and coat eyes, lungs, machinery, food and equipment; motor vehicles and aircraft need special oil filters and the barren terrain means that supplies for military operations have to be transported from outside. German engines tended to overheat and the life of their tanks' engines fell from 1,400–1,600 mi (2,300–2,600 km) to 300–900 mi (480–1,450 km) and this problem was made worse by the lack of standard spare parts for the German and Italian motor types.

=== Supply ===
==== Axis ====
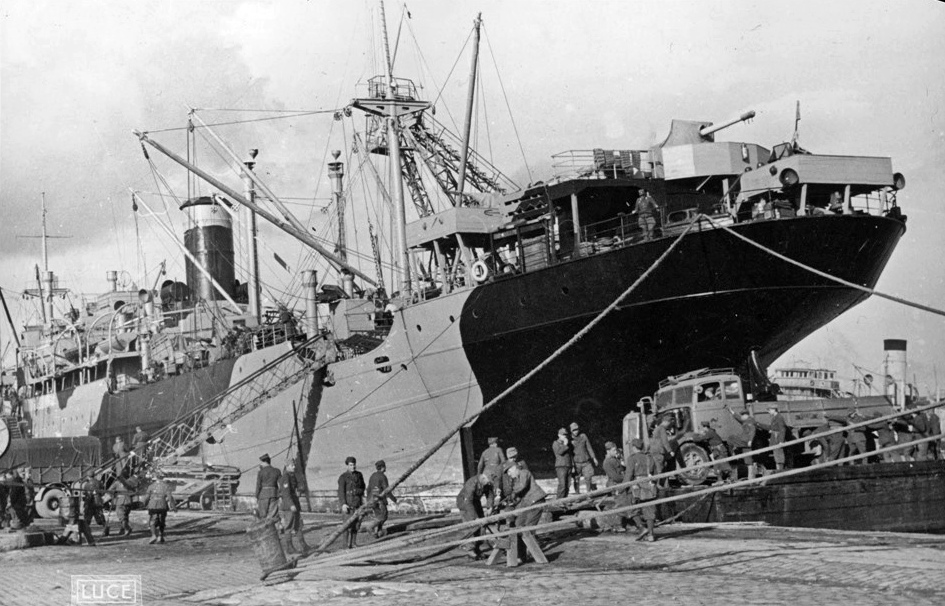
Vehicles are unloaded from an Italian cargo ship in Tunisia.

Italian supply shipments to Libya went about 600 mi (970 km) west around Sicily, then approached the coast of Tunisia before going on to Tripoli, in order to avoid interference from the British aircraft, ships and submarines based at Malta. In Africa, supplies had to be hauled huge distances by road or in small consignments by coaster. The distance from Tripoli to Benghazi today is 1,020 km (630 mi) and to El Alamein was 1,780 km (1,110 mi). A third of the Italian merchant marine was in ships berthed in British-controlled ports and was interned after Italy declared war. By September 1942 half of the remainder had been sunk, although much was replaced by new shipbuilding, salvage and transfers of German ships. From June 1940 to May 1943, 16 per cent of supply shipments were sunk.

Tobruk was pressed into use in June 1942 but Allied bombing and its long approach route led this effort to be abandoned in August. The Germans assumed that the maximum distance a motorised army could operate from its base was 200 mi (320 km) but on average about a third of Axis lorries were unserviceable and 35–50 per cent of the fuel deliveries were consumed transporting the remainder to the front. Fuel oil shortages in Italy, the small size of the ports in Libya and the need to meet civilian demand, required the inefficient dispatch of large numbers of small convoys. Oberkommando des Heeres (OKH, German army high command) concluded that German forces in Libya could not be supplied for a decisive offensive unless Italian forces were withdrawn to Italy, which was politically impossible.

==== British ====
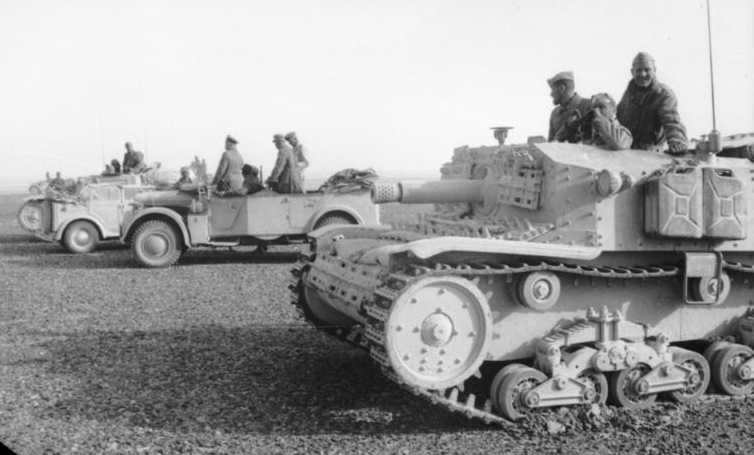
Italian Semovente 75/18 self-propelled assault gun

The geographical position of Italy made it possible for it to close the Mediterranean if war came and force the Mediterranean Fleet based in Egypt to rely on the Suez Canal. In 1939, Wavell began to plan a base in the Middle East to support about fifteen divisions (300,000 men), six in Egypt, three in Palestine and the rest further afield. Many of the supplies needed by the British were imported from the colonies and the rest obtained locally by stimulating the production of substitutes. The plan for a garrison of nine divisions in Egypt and Palestine was changed to fourteen divisions by June 1941 and then to 23 by March 1942. Once the Italians declared war in 1940 and until 1943, merchant ships travelled east from Britain around the Cape of Good Hope, which made Egypt as distant as Australia and New Zealand. The Middle East Supply Centre (MESC) operated in Egypt, Palestine and Syria to co-ordinate imports and create local substitutes for civilian rations and promote agricultural efficiencies. By March 1943 the MESC had replaced about 100 liberty ship deliveries' worth of imports with increased local production of potatoes, cooking oil, dairy products and fish; cattle drives from Sudan obviated the need for refrigerated shipping.

In 1940, British military forces had a base at the terminus of the Egyptian state railway, road and the port of Marsa Matruh (Matruh) 200 mi (320 km) west of Alexandria. Construction began on a water pipeline along the railway and the British surveyed sources of water. Wells were dug but most filled with salt water; in 1939 the primary fresh water sources were the Roman aqueducts at Marsa Matruh and Maaten Baggush. Water-boats from Alexandria and a distillation plant at Matruh increased supply but rigorous rationing had to be enforced and much water had to be moved overland to outlying areas. Not enough vehicles were available in 1939 and lorries were diverted to provide the Armoured Division with a better rear link. Only desert-worthy vehicles could be risked cross-country, which left tanks unable to move far from Matruh which was 120 mi (190 km) east of the Libyan border. From the border there was no water at Sollum or for another 50 mi (80 km) east of Sollum to Sidi Barrani, along a very poor road. An invader would have to move through a waterless and trackless desert to reach the main British force. In September 1940, the New Zealand Railway Battalion and Indian labourers began work on a coastal railway, which reached Sidi Barrani by October 1941 and Tobruk by December 1942, 400 mi (640 km) west of El Alamein, carrying 4,200 long tons (4,267 t) of water per day.

== 1940 ==
=== Frontier skirmishes ===
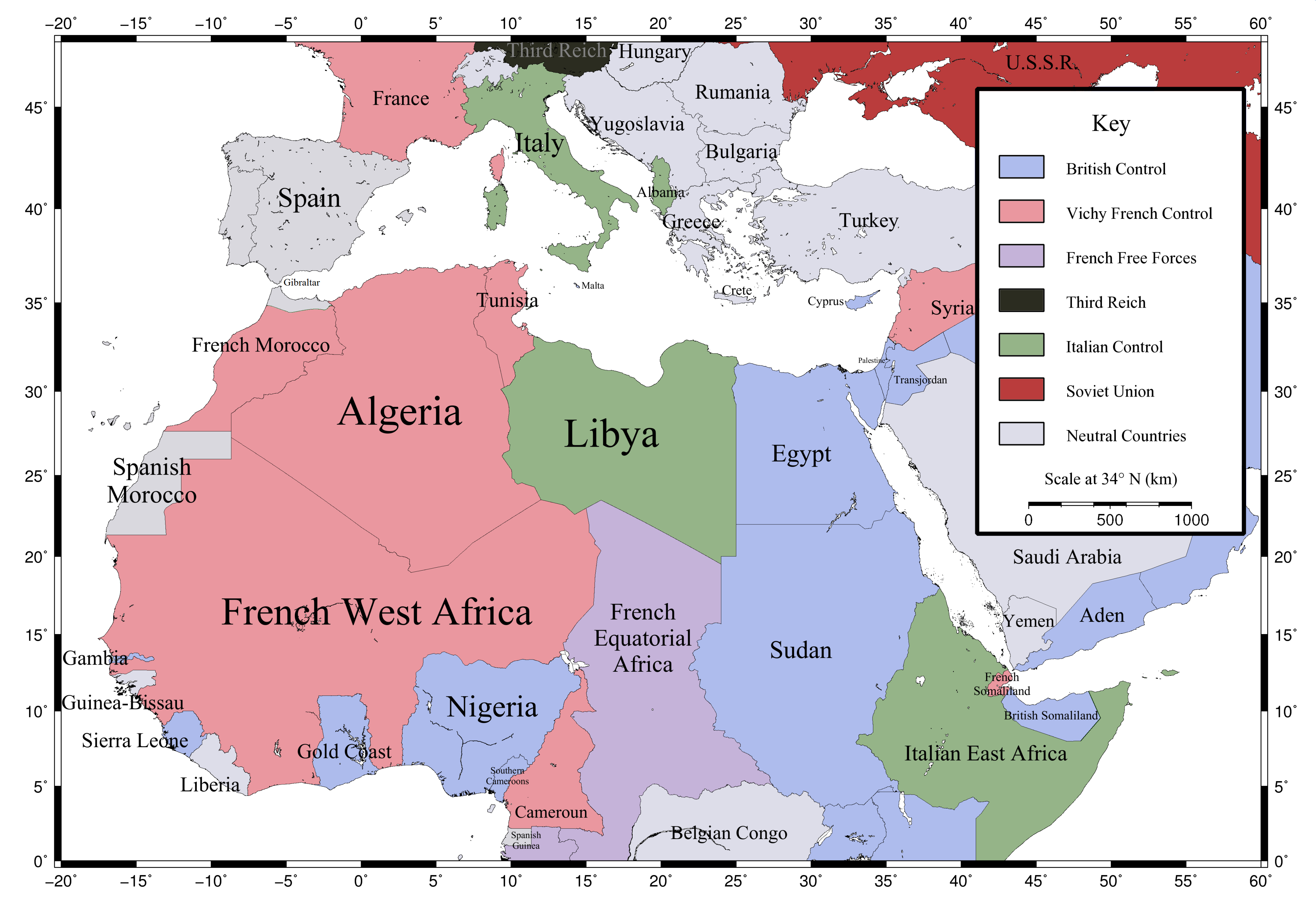
North Africa in 1940

On 11 June 1940, hostilities commenced. British troops were ordered to dominate the frontier and isolate Giarabub. They crossed into Libya that night, exchanged fire with Italian troops at Sidi Omar and discovered that some Italians were unaware that war had been declared. On 14 June, the British captured Fort Capuzzo and Fort Madalena, taking 220 prisoners. Two days later, the British raided a convoy on the Tobruk–Bardia road, killed 21 Italian soldiers and took 88 prisoners, including Generale di Brigata (Brigadier-General) Romolo Lastrucci, the 10th Army Chief Engineer. At an engagement near the frontier wire at Nezuet Ghirba, a mixed force of British tanks, artillery and motorised infantry defeated an Italian force of 17 light tanks, four guns and 400 infantry.

The British patrolled the frontier area as far west as Tobruk, establishing dominance over the 10th Army. On 5 August, thirty Italian tanks engaged the 8th Hussars in an inconclusive action and Wavell concluded that vehicle wear made it impractical to continue operations when an Italian offensive loomed. Sand wore out equipment quickly, shortening the track life of tanks. Spare parts ran out and only half the tank strength could be kept operational. A lull fell from August to early September as Operation Hats, a naval operation, reinforced the Mediterranean Fleet and helped to bring an army convoy of tanks and crews via the Cape. The British claimed to have inflicted 3,500 casualties with a loss of 150 men between 11 June and 9 September. Further afield, both sides established scouting groups, the Long Range Desert Group (LRDG) and Auto-Saharan Company (Compagnie Auto-Avio-Sahariane) which ranged the desert, raided and observed their opponents' dispositions.

=== Operazione E ===
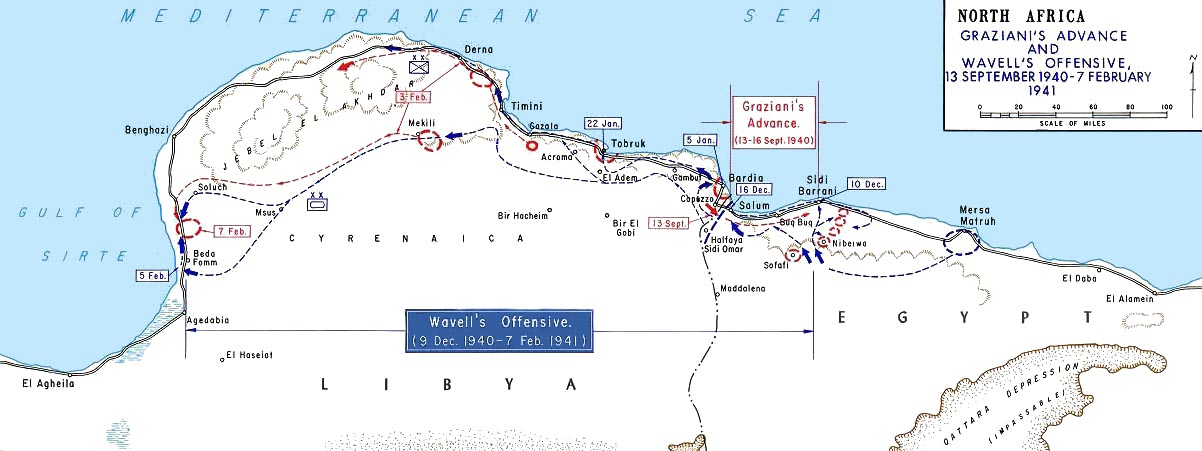
Military operations, 13 September 1940 – 7 February 1941

Benito Mussolini had no plans to invade Egypt, intending to remain on the defensive in Libya if war came. After the fall of France in 1940, the 5th Army could send reinforcements east and on 7 August, Mussolini ordered an invasion to occupy Egypt and establish a land connection with Italian East Africa. In August a lull fell on the frontier. Most British armoured units had withdrawn to Marsa Matruh, in order to conserve their ability to defend the port. The 7th Support Group took over and established observation posts from Sollum to Fort Maddalena, ready to delay an Italian offensive and the Hussars reconnoitred further into Libya.

The Libyan divisions lacked the transport necessary to operate with the Maletti Group, which had one medium, two mixed and four light tank battalions on the escarpment and were redeployed to the coast road. On 9 September, the Maletti Group got lost en route to Sidi Omar and Rodolfo Graziani cancelled a flanking move and concentrated on the coast road, with five divisions and the Maletti Group; the 4th CC.NN. Division "3 Gennaio" and 64th Infantry Division "Catanzaro" divisions stayed in reserve at Tobruk. The 5th Squadra, a mixed air unit with about 300 serviceable aircraft, airfield equipment and transport, stood by to support the advance and occupy airfields.

The Italian invasion of Egypt on 13–18 September began as a limited tactical operation towards Marsa Matruh, rather than the strategic objectives sketched in Rome, due to the chronic lack of transport, fuel and wireless equipment, even with resupply from the 5th Army. Musiad was subjected to a "spectacular" artillery bombardment at dawn, then occupied. The 1st Libyan Division took Sollum and the airfield. By evening the 2nd Libyan Division, 63rd Infantry Division "Cirene", the Maletti Group from Musaid and the 62nd Infantry Division "Marmarica" from Sidi Omar, pushed past British harassing parties and converged on Halfaya Pass.

The British withdrew past Buq Buq on 14 September and continued to harass the Italian advance. They fell back to Alam Hamid the next day and to Alam el Dab on 16 September. An Italian force of fifty tanks attempted a flanking move so the British rearguard retired east of Sidi Barrani, which was occupied by the 1st CC.NN. Division "23 Marzo" and Graziani halted the advance. The British resumed observation and the 7th Armoured Division prepared to challenge an attack on Marsa Matruh. Despite prodding from Mussolini, the Italians dug in around Sidi Barrani and Sofafi, about 80 mi (130 km) west of the British defences at Marsa Matruh, repairing roads demolished by the British, cleaning wells and beginning work on a water pipeline from the border, accumulating supplies for the resumption of the advance in mid-December. Egypt broke off diplomatic relations with the Axis and Italian aircraft bombed Cairo on 19 October.

British naval and air operations to harass the Italian army continued and caused damage which prisoners reported had lowered morale. Armoured car patrols dominated no man's land but a lack of landing grounds reduced the effectiveness of the RAF and Malta was out of range. Operation Compass, a British counter-attack to an Italian advance on Matruh, planned to destroy Italian forces and most of the WDF was moved up to the port. An additional armoured car company joined reconnaissance operations far behind the front line. The WDF had been reinforced with a new tank regiment with Matilda II tanks. Rather than wait for the Italians, the British began after about a month to prepare a raid of 4–5 days' duration on the central group of the Italian encampments and then on Sofafi.

=== Operation Compass ===
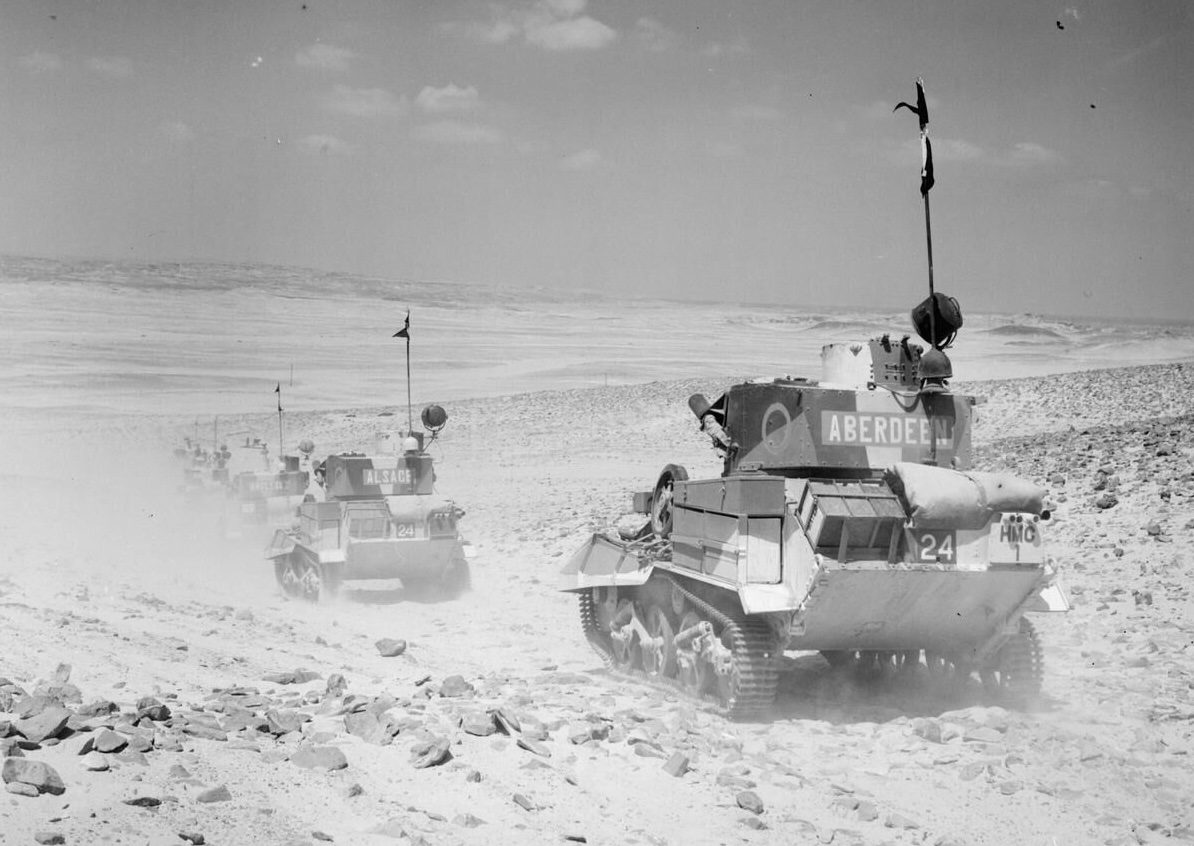
British light tanks cross the desert in 1940.

In December 1940, the 10th Army in Egypt had been reinforced with the 1st and 2nd Libyan divisions and 4th Blackshirt Division, in the fortified camps from Sidi Barrani to the Tummars and Maktila. The Maletti Group was based at Nibeiwa, the 63rd Infantry Division Cirene at Rabia and Sofafi, the 62nd Infantry Division Marmarica was on the escarpment from Sofafi to Halfaya Pass and the 64th Infantry Division "Catanzaro" was east of Buq Buq, behind the Nibeiwa–Rabia gap, supported by about 500 aircraft of the 5° Squada (General Felip Porro). The RAF attacked airfields on 7 December and destroyed 39 aircraft on the ground. Operation Compass (the Battle of Marmarica/Battle of the Camps), began when Selby Force advanced from Matruh to isolate Maktila early on 9 December. The 4th Indian Division and the 7th Royal Tank Regiment (7th RTR) attacked Nibeiwa at dawn and overran the camp, then moved on Tummar West, which fell in the afternoon. A counter-attack from Tummar East was repulsed and the camp taken the next day.

==== Battle of Sidi Barrani ====
A 7th Armoured Division screen to the west prevented the reinforcement of Sidi Barrani and on 10 December, the British cut the coast road and the 7th Armoured Division mopped up around Buq Buq, taking many prisoners. On 11 December, the Italians were defeated at Sidi Barrani; Rabia and Sofafi were abandoned and the 7th Armoured Division pursued along the coast and the escarpment. Late on 14 December, the 11th Hussars cut the Via Balbia between Tobruk and Bardia, captured Sidi Omar on 16 December and forced the Italians to retreat from Sollum and Fort Capuzzo to Bardia, leaving garrisons at Siwa Oasis and Giarabub in the south. From 9 to 11 December, the British took 38,300 prisoners, 237 guns, 73 tanks and about 1,000 vehicles for 624 casualties.

==== Battle of Bardia ====
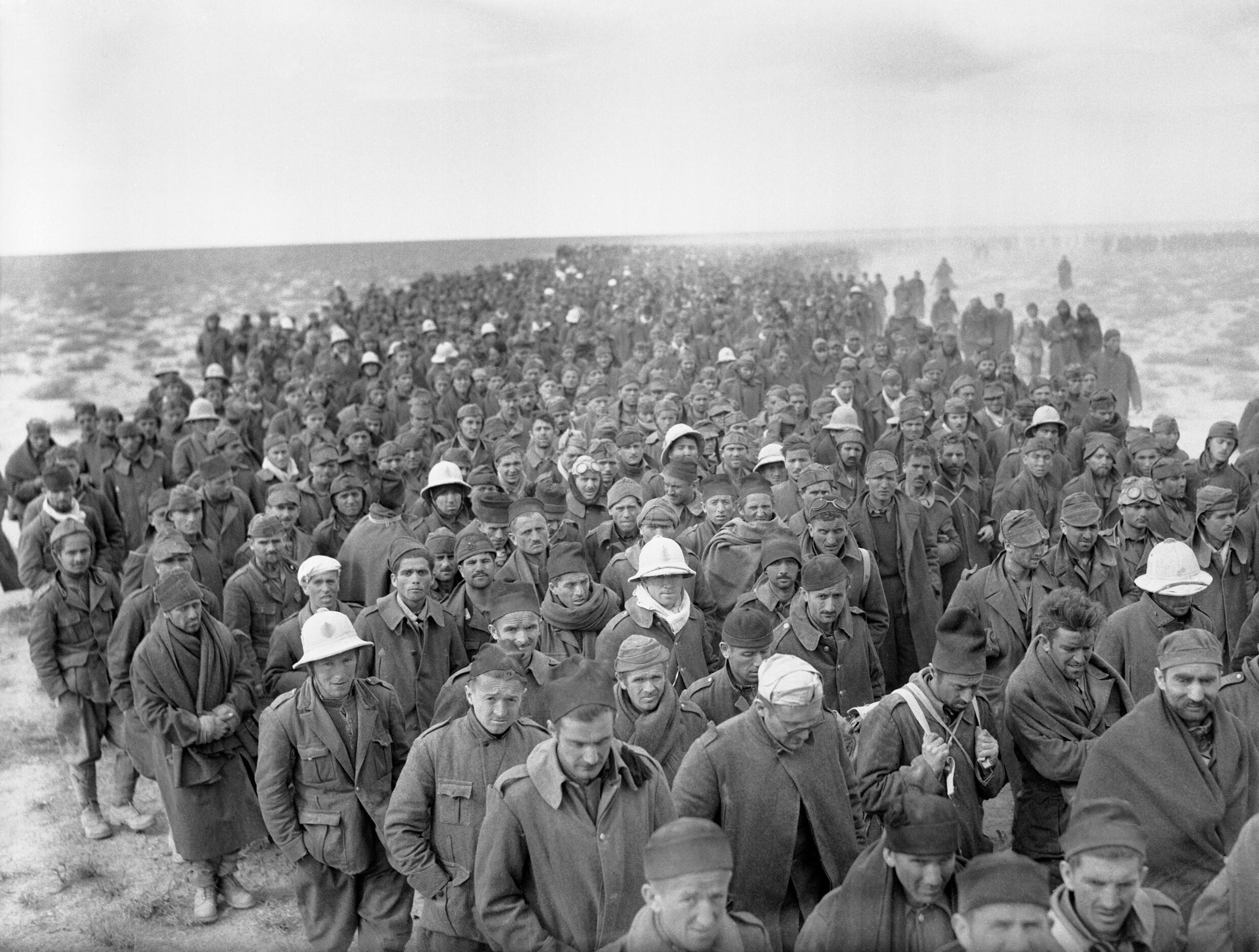
Italian soldiers captured during the Battle of Bardia

Bardia fell between 14 December and 5 January 1941; the British suffered 456 Australian infantry casualties and lost 17 of 23 tanks, for 40,000 Italian casualties and prisoners, more than 400 guns, 130 tanks and hundreds of lorries. At dawn on 21 January, Australian infantry broke into Tobruk and made a path for 18 British I tanks. The Australians pressed on and captured half of the Tobruk defences by nightfall. The Australians took 25,000 prisoners, 208 guns and 87 tanks, for a loss of 355 Australian and 45 British troops. The 7th Armoured Division drove 100 mi (160 km) towards Derna and the Babini Group (BCS – Brigata Corazzata Speciale under General Valentino Babini), with about 300 tanks, at Mechili. The BCS slipped away and from 26 to 28 January the British tanks bogged down in heavy rain; Derna was abandoned next day. The 7th Armoured Division sent Combeforce, a flying column, to Beda Fomm and cut off the 10th Army.

==== Battle of Beda Fomm ====
Estimated POW numbers: Western Desert and Cyrenaica (9 December 1940 – 8 February 1941)
Place	PoW	Tanks	Guns
Sidi Barrani	38,289	73	297
Sidi Omar	900	0	8
Bardia	42,000	130	275
Tobruk	25,000	87	208
Mechili	100	13	0
Derna; Benghazi	2,000	10	24
Benghazi; Agedabia	25,000	107	93
Total	133,298	420	845

In late January 1941, the British learned that the Italians were evacuating Cyrenaica along the Via Balbia from Benghazi. The 7th Armoured Division, under Major-General Sir Michael O'Moore Creagh, was dispatched to intercept the remnants of the 10th Army by cutting through the desert south of the Jebel Akhdar via Msus and Antelat, as the 6th Australian Division pursued the Italians along the coast road north of the Jebel Akhdar. The terrain was hard going for the British tanks and Combeforce (Lieutenant-Colonel John Combe), a flying column of wheeled vehicles, was sent on ahead.

Late on 5 February, Combeforce arrived at the Via Balbia south of Benghazi and set up roadblocks near Sidi Saleh, about 20 mi (32 km) north of Ajedabia and 30 mi (48 km) south-west of Antelat. The forward elements of the 10th Army arrived thirty minutes later and found the Via Balbia blocked. The next day the Italians attacked to break through the roadblock and continued to attack into 7 February. With British reinforcements arriving and the Australians pressing down the road from Benghazi, the 10th Army surrendered. From Benghazi–Agedabia, the British took 25,000 prisoners, captured 107 tanks and 93 guns of the totals for Operation Compass of 133,298 men, 420 tanks and 845 guns.

On 9 February, Churchill ordered the advance to stop and troops to be dispatched to Greece to take part in Operation Marita of the Greco-Italian War, since a German attack through Macedonia was thought imminent. The British were unable to continue beyond El Agheila anyway, because of vehicle breakdowns, exhaustion and the effect of the much longer supply line from the base in Egypt. A few thousand men of the 10th Army escaped the disaster in Cyrenaica but the 5th Army in Tripolitania had four divisions. The Sirte, Tmed Hassan and Buerat strongholds were reinforced from Italy, which brought the 10th and 5th Armies up to about 150,000 men. German reinforcements were sent to Libya to form a blocking detachment (Sperrverband) under Directive 22 of 11 January. These were the first units of the Afrika Korps of Generalleutnant (Lieutenant-General) Erwin Rommel.

== 1941 ==
=== Greece ===
A week after the Italian surrender at Beda Fomm, the Defence Committee in London ordered Cyrenaica held with the minimum of forces and all spare troops sent to Greece. In the Western Desert Force (now XIII Corps), the 6th Australian Division was fully equipped and had few losses to replace. The 7th Armoured Division had been operating for eight months, had worn out its mechanical equipment and had withdrawn to refit. Two regiments of the 2nd Armoured Division with the WDF were also worn out, which left the division with only four tank regiments. The 6th Australian Division went to Greece in March with an armoured brigade group of the 2nd Armoured Division; the remainder of the division and the new 9th Australian Division, minus two brigades and most of its transport, was sent to Greece and was replaced by two under-equipped brigades of the 7th Australian Division. The division took over in Cyrenaica, on the assumption that the Italians could not begin a counter-offensive until May, even with German reinforcements. (Note: The 2nd Armoured Division in Cyrenaica had the 3rd Armoured Brigade, with an under-strength light tank regiment, a second regiment using captured Italian tanks and a cruiser tank regiment from mid-March, with worn-out tanks. The 2nd Support Group had only one motor battalion, a field artillery regiment, one anti-tank battery and a machine-gun company; most of the divisional transport had gone to Greece.)

==== Emigré formations ====
Following the fall of Greece to the Axis, elements of the Greek armed forces in April and May, including several thousand soldiers, escaped to the British Middle East, primarily through neutral Turkey. These elements formed the backbone of the Greek Armed Forces in the Middle East, which continued to fight alongside the Allies throughout the remainder of the North African Campaign, under the direct command of the Greek government-in-exile. At the same time, elements of the Yugoslav armed forces also managed to escape to Egypt via Greece. The Royal Yugoslav Army Outside the Homeland in Africa consisted of over 1,000 officers and soldiers of the Royal Yugoslav Army, Air Force, and Navy. These units, particularly the No. 2 (Yugoslav) Floatplane Squadron, the Yugoslav-manned Orjen-class torpedo boats Durmitor and Kajmakčalan, and the Royal Yugoslav Guards Battalion, participated in the Western Desert campaign. This was the only part of the Royal Yugoslav Army that remained under the command of the Yugoslav government-in-exile in Cairo.

=== First Italo-German offensive ===
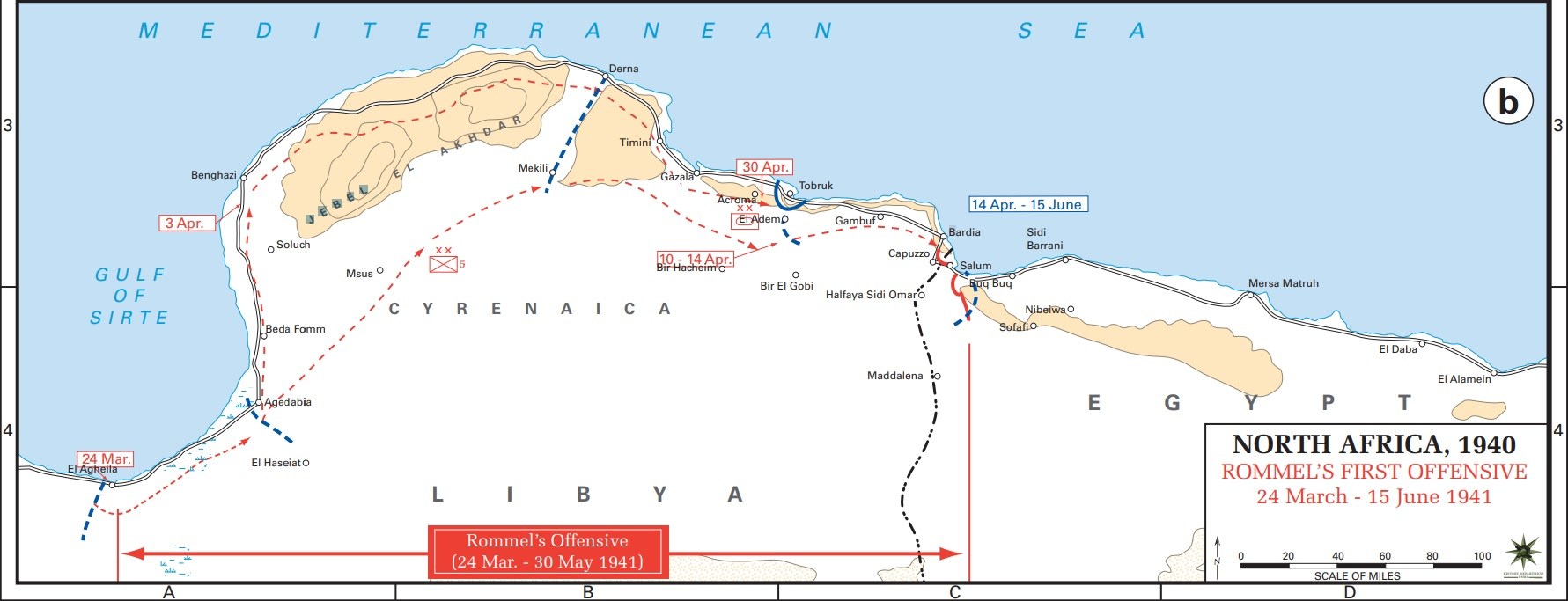
Operation Sonnenblume, 24 March – 15 June 1941

In early 1941, after the big British and Commonwealth victory in Cyrenaica, the military position was soon reversed. The best-equipped units in XIII Corps went to Greece as part of Operation Lustre in the Battle of Greece. Adolf Hitler responded to the Italian disaster with Directive 22 (11 January) ordering Unternehmen Sonnenblume (Operation Sunflower), the deployment of a new Afrika Korps (DAK) to Libya, as a Sperrverband (barrier detachment). The DAK had fresh troops with better tanks, equipment and air support and was led by General Erwin Rommel, who had enjoyed great success in the Battle of France. The Italians also sent better-equipped troops, including 101st Motorized Division "Trieste" and the 132nd Armored Division "Ariete" armored division. The Axis force raided and quickly defeated the British at El Agheila on 24 March and at Marsa el Brega on 31 March, and in the second battle of El Mechili on 7-8 april. They exploited those successes and, by 15 April, had pushed the British back to the border at Sollum and besieged Tobruk. The new commander of XIII Corps (now HQ Cyrenaica Command) Lieutenant-General Philip Neame, O'Connor and Major-General Michael Gambier-Parry, commander of the 2nd Armoured Division were captured. The Western Desert Force HQ took over under Lieutenant-General Noel Beresford-Peirse, who had been recalled from East Africa. Apart from an armoured brigade group of the 2nd Armoured Division, which had been withdrawn for the Greek campaign, the rest of the division had been destroyed. Several Axis attempts to seize Tobruk failed and the front line settled on the Egyptian border.

=== Siege of Tobruk ===
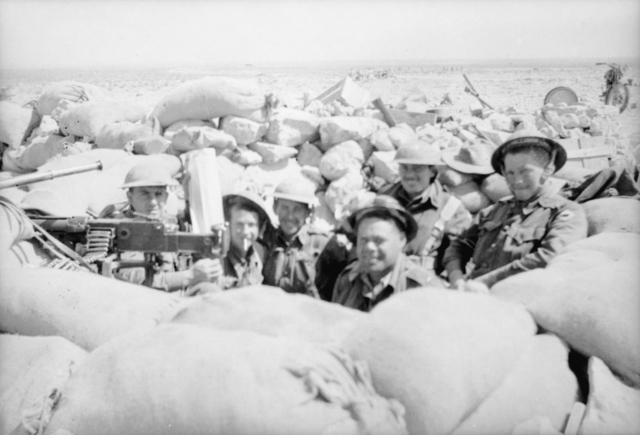
Men of 2/48th Australian Battalion occupying a defensive position near Tobruk, 24 April 1941

Tobruk was defended by a force of about 25,000 troops of the Western Desert Force, well stocked with supplies and linked to Egypt by the Royal Navy. The garrison had armoured cars and captured Italian tanks, which could raid Axis supply convoys as they passed through Tobruk for the frontier, thus preventing the Axis from invading Egypt. Rommel attempted to take the port but the 9th Australian Division under General Leslie Morshead, resolutely defended the port. The Italians were slow to provide blueprints for the port's fortifications and several attacks were repulsed. After three weeks Rommel suspended the attacks and resumed the siege. Italian infantry divisions took up positions around the fortress while the bulk of the Afrika Korps maintained a mobile position south and east of the port.

==== Operation Brevity ====
Operation Brevity (15–16 May) was a limited offensive, to inflict attrition on Axis forces and secure positions for a general offensive towards Tobruk. The British attacked with a small tank-infantry force in three columns, Desert, Centre and Coast. Desert Column, with British cruiser tanks, was to advance inland and destroy tanks found en route to Sidi Aziz. Centre Column was to capture the top of the Halfaya Pass, Bir Wair and Musaid, then press on to Fort Capuzzo. Coast Column was to take Sollum and the foot of Halfaya Pass. Sollum, Halfaya Pass and Fort Capuzzo were captured but then the fort was lost to a counter-attack. A German counter-attack on 16 May threatened the force at the top of the pass and a retreat was ordered, covered by Desert Column. The Germans took Musaid back and a general British retreat began, to a line from Sidi Omar to Sidi Suleiman and Sollum, which left only the Halfaya Pass in British hands. Brevity failed to achieve most of its objectives and only briefly held the Halfaya Pass. The British lost 206 casualties. Five tanks were destroyed and 13 damaged. German casualties were 258 men, three tanks destroyed and several damaged. Italian casualties were 395, of whom 347 were captured. On 12 May, the Tiger convoy lost one ship and arrived in Alexandria, with 238 tanks, to re-equip the 7th Armoured Division and 43 aircraft. On 28 May, planning began for Operation Battleaxe.

==== Unternehmen Skorpion ====
During the evening of 26 May, Kampfgruppe von Herff under Oberst [Colonel] Maximilian von Herff comprising three panzer battalions, assembled on the coast at the foot of Halfaya Pass and attacked the next morning, intending to bluff the British into retreat. The pass was defended by the 3rd Coldstream Guards of Lieutenant-Colonel Moubray and supporting units but the bluff became a genuine attack and secured a commanding position, leaving the British in danger of being surrounded. Brigadier William Gott authorised a withdrawal and Moubray extricated the battalion. There were no reinforcements nearby and Gott ordered a withdrawal from the pass, which Axis forces re-occupied. The Italo-German positions on the border were fortified with barbed wire and minefields and covered by 50 mm and 88 mm anti-tank guns. Behind the new defences the Axis began to accumulate supplies and receive the 15th Panzer Division, which began to arrive on 20 May.

==== Operation Battleaxe ====
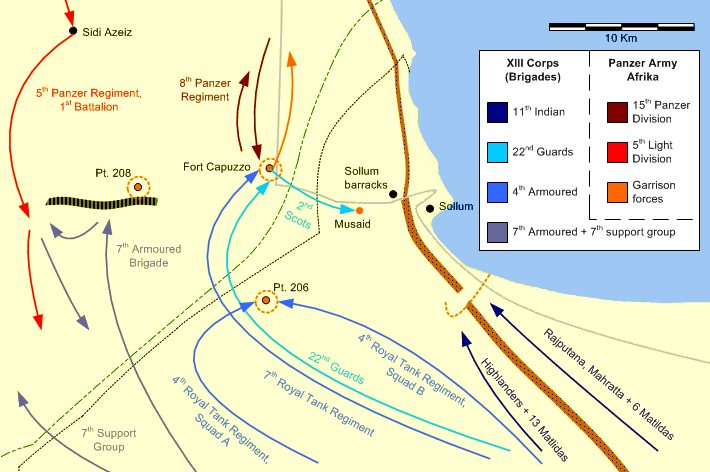
Operation Battleaxe (Day 1)

Operation Battleaxe, 15–17 June 1941, was intended to lift the Siege of Tobruk and re-capture eastern Cyrenaica. The attack was to be conducted by the 7th Armoured Division and a composite infantry force based on the 4th Indian Division headquarters, with two brigades. The infantry were to attack in the area of Bardia, Sollum, Halfaya and Capuzzo, with the tanks guarding the southern flank. For the first time in the war, a large German force fought on the defensive. The Halfaya Pass attack failed, Point 206 was captured and only one of three attacks on Hafid Ridge had any success. At the end of 15 June, 48 British tanks remained operational. On 16 June, a German counter-attack forced back the British on the western flank but was repulsed in the centre. However, the British were reduced to 21 operational Cruiser tanks and seventeen infantry tanks.

On 17 June, the British only just evaded encirclement by two Panzer regiments and ended the operation. Despite British overextension, the Germans failed to turn a defensive success into an annihilating victory. Intelligence had provided details of British moves but the RAF had seen German counter-moves and slowed them enough to help the ground forces escape. The British had 969 casualties, 27 cruiser and 64 I tanks were knocked out or broken down and not recovered. The RAF lost 36 aircraft. German losses were 678 men and Italian losses are unknown, with in addition twelve tanks and ten aircraft lost. The British failure led to the sacking of Wavell, the XIII Corps commander, Lieutenant-General Noel Beresford-Peirse and Creagh, the 7th Armoured Division commander. General Claude Auchinleck took over as the Commander-in-Chief of Middle East Command. In September, the Western Desert Force was renamed the Eighth Army.

==== Operation Crusader ====
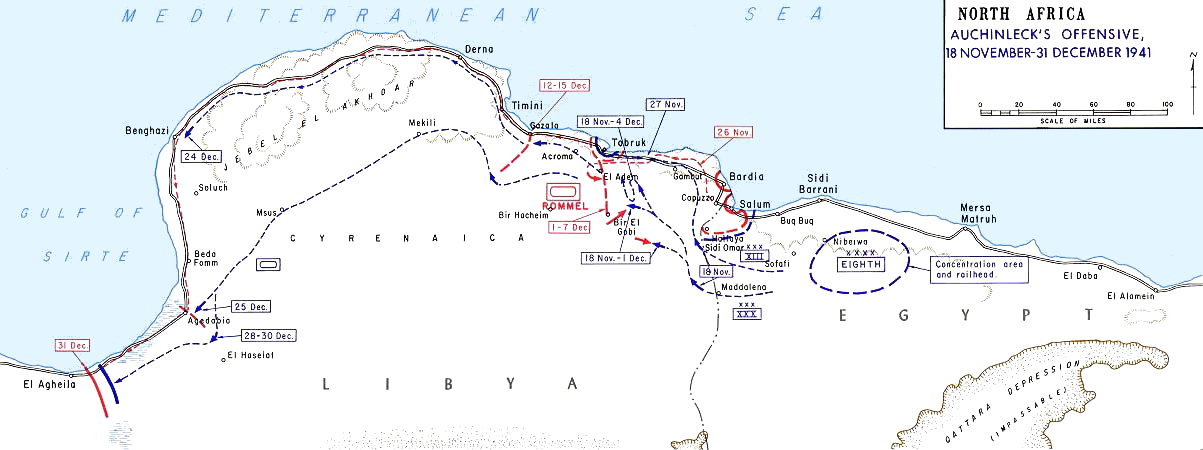
Operation Crusader, 18 November – 31 December 1941 (enlarges)

The Eighth Army (Lieutenant-General Alan Cunningham) conducted Operation Crusader from 18 November to 30 December, aiming to relieve Tobruk and capture eastern Cyrenaica. The Eighth Army planned to destroy Axis armour before committing its infantry but was repulsed several times, culminating in the defeat of the 7th Armoured Division by the Afrika Korps at Sidi Rezegh. Rommel ordered the panzer divisions to relieve the Axis positions on the Egyptian border but failed to find the main body of the Allied infantry, which had bypassed the fortresses and headed for Tobruk. Rommel pulled his armour back from the frontier towards Tobruk and achieved several tactical successes, which led Auchinleck to replace Cunningham with Major-General Neil Ritchie. The Axis forces then withdrew to the west of Tobruk to the Gazala Line and then back to El Agheila, leaving the Axis garrisons at Bardia and Sollum isolated and which surrendered later. The British suffered 17,700 casualties against 37,400 Axis, many of them taken prisoner when the garrisons left behind at Halfaya and Bardia surrendered. Tobruk had been relieved, Cyrenaica recaptured and airfields reoccupied to cover convoys supplying Malta.

==== Axis supply: 1940–1941 ====
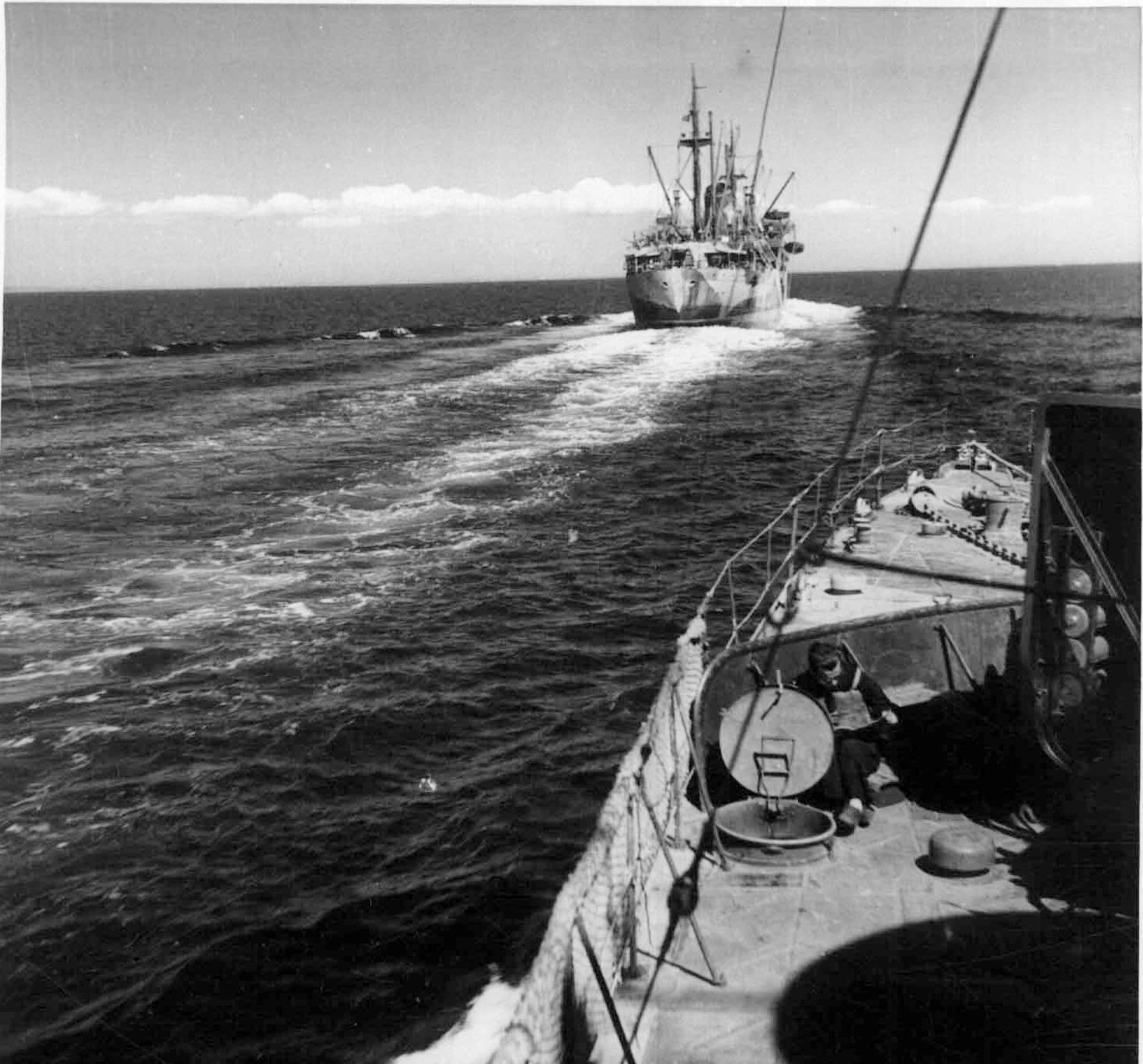
Italian convoy sailing towards North Africa

Axis supplies from Europe to Libya were moved by road and after Operation Compass (December 1940 – February 1941), only Tripoli remained as an entrepôt, with a maximum capacity of four troopships or five cargo ships at once and an unloading capacity of about 45,000 long tons (45,722 t) per month. Tripoli to Benghazi was 600 mi (970 km) along the Via Balbia and only halfway to Alexandria. The road could flood, was vulnerable to the Desert Air Force (DAF) and using desert tracks increased vehicle wear. The Axis advance of 300 mi (480 km) to the Egyptian frontier in early 1941 increased the road transport distance to 1,100 mi (1,800 km). Benghazi was captured in April; coastal shipping there had a capacity of only 15,000 long tons (15,241 t) and the port was within range of the DAF. About 1,500 long tons (1,524 t) of supplies per day could be unloaded at Tobruk but lack of shipping made its capture irrelevant.

A German motorised division needed 350 long tons (356 t) of supplies a day and moving its supplies 300 mi (480 km) required 1,170 2.0 t (2 long tons) lorry-loads. With seven Axis divisions, air force and naval units, 70,000 long tons (71,123 t) of supplies were needed per month. The Vichy French agreed to Axis use of Bizerta in Tunisia but this did not begin until late in 1942. From February to May 1941, a surplus of 45,000 long tons (45,722 t) was delivered; attacks from Malta had some effect but in May, the worst month for ship losses, 91 per cent of supplies actually arrived. Lack of transportation in Libya left German supplies in Tripoli and the Italians had only 7,000 lorries for deliveries to their 225,000 men. A record amount of supplies arrived in June but shortages worsened at the front.

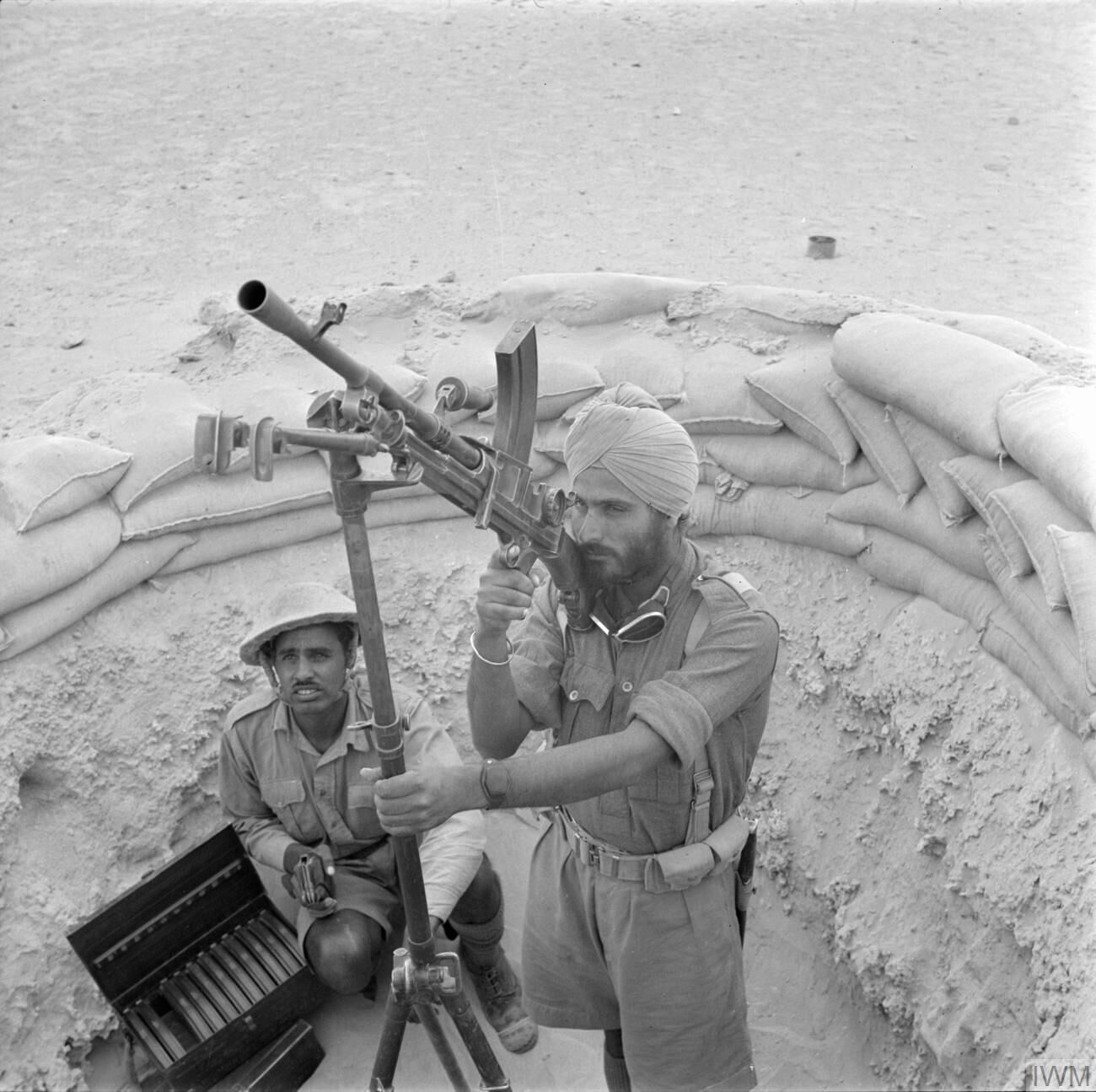
Indian troops man a Bren gun on an anti-aircraft mounting, Western Desert, 18 April 1941.

There were fewer Axis attacks on Malta from June and ship losses increased from 19% in July, to 25 per cent in September, when Benghazi was bombed and ships diverted to Tripoli; air supply in October made little difference. Deliveries averaged 72,000 long tons (73,155 t) a month from July to October but the consumption of 30 to 50 per cent of fuel deliveries by road transport and truck non-serviceability of 35 per cent reduced deliveries to the front. In November, a five-ship convoy was sunk during Operation Crusader and ground attacks on road convoys stopped journeys in daylight. Lack of deliveries coupled with the Eighth Army offensive forced a retreat to El Agheila from 4 December, crowding the Via Balbia, where British ambushes destroyed about half of the remaining Axis transport.

Convoys to Tripoli resumed and losses increased but by 16 December the supply situation had eased except for the fuel shortage. In December, the Luftwaffe was restricted to one sortie per day. Vichy sold the Axis 3,600 long tons (3,658 t) of fuel, U-boats were ordered into the Mediterranean and air reinforcements were sent from Russia in December. The Italian navy used warships to carry fuel to Derna and Benghazi and made a maximum effort from 16 to 17 December. Four battleships, three light cruisers and 20 destroyers escorted four ships to Libya. The use of an armada for 20,000 long tons (20,321 t) of cargo ships, depleted the navy fuel reserve and only one more battleship convoy was possible. Bizerta was canvassed as an entrepôt but it was within range of RAF aircraft from Malta and was another 500 mi (800 km) west of Tripoli.

== 1942 ==
=== Unternehmen Theseus ===
The Eighth Army advance of 500 mi (800 km) to El Agheila transferred the burden of an over-stretched supply line to the British. In January 1942, the British withdrew from the front to reduce the supply burden and to prepare for Operation Acrobat, a 1941 plan to advance west against Tripolitania. The British overestimated Axis losses during Operation Crusader and believed that they faced 35,000 troops, rather than the true total of 80,000 men and also misjudged the speed of Axis reinforcement from Europe. The Eighth Army expected to be ready by February, well before an Axis attack. The 1st Armoured Division held the area around El Agheila and from 28 to 29 December was engaged near Ajedabia and lost 61 of 90 tanks, vs. seven German tanks lost.

Panzerarmee Afrika began Operation Theseus on 21 January and defeated the 2nd Armoured Brigade in detail. By 23 January, the brigade was down from 150 to 75 tanks, against a German loss of 29 tanks out of 100. Benghazi fell on 28 January and Timimi on 3 February. By 6 February, the British were back to the Gazala line, a few miles west of Tobruk, from which the Panzerarmee had retreated seven weeks earlier. The British had 1,309 casualties from 21 January, had 42 tanks knocked out and another 30 damaged or broken down and lost forty field guns. The commander of XIII Corps Lieutenant-General Alfred Reade Godwin-Austen resigned over differences with the Eighth Army commander, Neil Ritchie.

=== Battle of Gazala ===
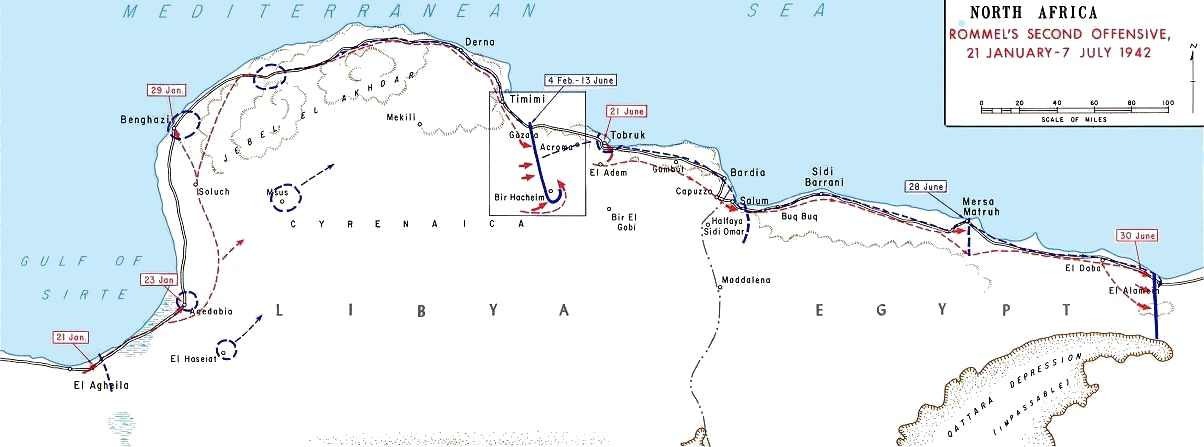
Battle of Gazala, 21 January – 7 July 1942 (click to enlarge)

By February the front was at the Gazala line, west of Tobruk. In the spring both sides prepared for another battle. The British planned Operation Buckshot for June to destroy the Panzerarmee and re-capture Cyrenaica but in early May defensive measures on the Egyptian border took priority, as an Axis attack became imminent. (Note: Since early 1941, Colonel Bonner Fellers, an American liaison officer, had been free to roam around Egypt and the Eighth Army. Fellers communicated his findings nightly to Washington, using a code which had been broken by Axis cryptanalysts, who provided Rommel with details of the British defence scheme.) Unternehmen Venezia (the Battle of Gazala) from 26 May to 21 June 1942, began when Afrika Korps and Italian tanks drove south, around the flank of the Gazala line and were isolated by Free French and other Allied troops at Bir Hakeim, who intercepted Axis supply convoys.

Rommel retreated to a position abutting the British minefields and Ritchie ordered Operation Aberdeen, a counter-attack for 5 June. To the north, the 32nd Army Tank Brigade lost 50 of 70 tanks. The 7th Armoured Division and the 5th Indian Infantry Division on the eastern flank attacked at 2:50 a.m. and met with disaster when the British artillery bombardment fell short of the German anti-tank screen. The 22nd Armoured Brigade lost 60 of 156 tanks and turned away, leaving the 9th Indian Brigade stranded. An afternoon counter-attack by the Ariete and 21st Panzer divisions and a 15th Panzer Division attack on the Knightsbridge Box overran the tactical HQs of the two British divisions and the 9th Indian Division. The 10th Indian Infantry Brigade and smaller units were dispersed and command broke down. The 9th Indian Brigade, a reconnaissance regiment and four artillery regiments were lost and the British fled from the Gazala Line on 13 June, with only 70 operational tanks.

==== Fall of Tobruk ====
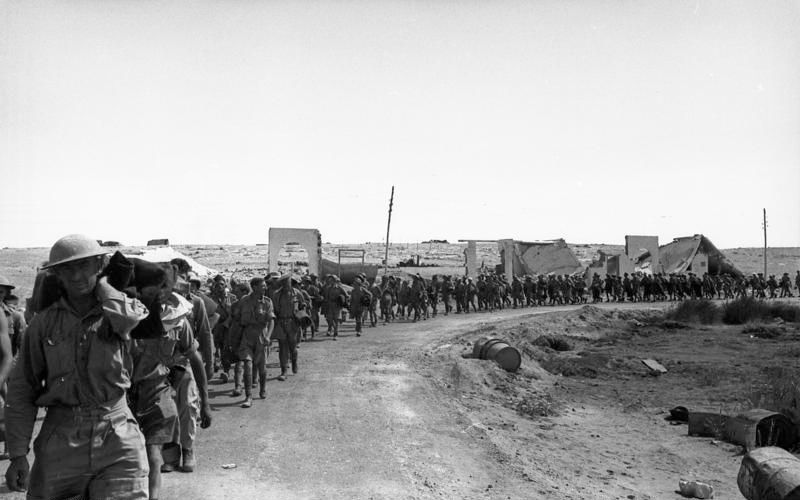
British prisoners go "into the bag", Tobruk, 1942

Gott, now a Lieutenant-General and commander of XIII Corps, appointed Major-General Hendrik Klopper to the command of the 2nd South African Division, to defend Tobruk. Along with two South African brigades, were the 201st Guards (Motorised) Brigade, 11th Indian Infantry Brigade, 32nd Army Tank Brigade and the 4th Anti-Aircraft Brigade. Tobruk had been besieged for nine months in 1941 but this time the Royal Navy could not guarantee the supply of the garrison and Auchinleck viewed Tobruk as expendable but expected that it could hold out for two months. On 21 June, 35,000 Eighth Army troops surrendered to Lieutenant-General Enea Navarini, the commander of XXI Corps. Auchinleck relieved Ritchie, took over the Eighth Army and stopped the Axis advance at El Alamein, 70 mi (110 km) from Alexandria; after the First Battle of El Alamein Auchinleck was also sacked.

==== Unternehmen Herkules ====
Italian plans to invade Malta by sea began during the Second Italo-Abyssinian War (3 October 1935 – May 1936). An opportunity to capture Malta occurred in April 1941 but Operation Mercury (20 May – 1 June 1941), the invasion of Crete, was conducted first, with such losses of parachute troops and transport aircraft that a second operation in 1941 was impossible. Luftwaffe units apart from Fliegerkorps X then went east for Operation Barbarossa and by June 1941, the island air defences had recovered. Luftwaffe units returned to the Mediterranean in spring 1942 and managed to neutralise the offensive capacity of the island garrison. In April, Hitler and Mussolini agreed to mount Unternehmen Herkules, an Italian-German air and sea invasion. Two Fliegerkorps with hundreds of Junkers Ju 52 transport aircraft, gliders (including 24 Messerschmitt Me 321 Gigants) and about 200 Regia Aeronautica transport aircraft were assembled for the invasion.

The Italian navy assembled an armada of Marinefährprahm (MFP), converted civilian ships and mine layers and 74 smaller boats. German MFPs, Siebel ferries, Pionierlandungsboote, Sturmboote, large inflatable rafts and the Seeschlange (Sea Snake a portable landing bridge), were contributed by the German navy. (Note: The German army had developed Seeschlange as a portable landing bridge and floating roadway, from joined modules which could be towed into place to act as a temporary jetty.) Rommel wished to attack, having refitted the force in Libya, to forestall an Eighth Army offensive, which was agreed by Hitler and Mussolini, with the proviso that an advance would stop at Tobruk, ready for the invasion of Malta in August. After the success of Unternehmen Venezia and the capture of Tobruk in June, the advance by the Panzerarmee kept going after the fall of Tobruk. The pursuit of a defeated enemy had more appeal than the hazards of the Malta operation. Herkules was cancelled, in favour of Unternehmen Aïda, an invasion of Egypt to capture the Suez Canal.

==== Unternehmen Aïda ====
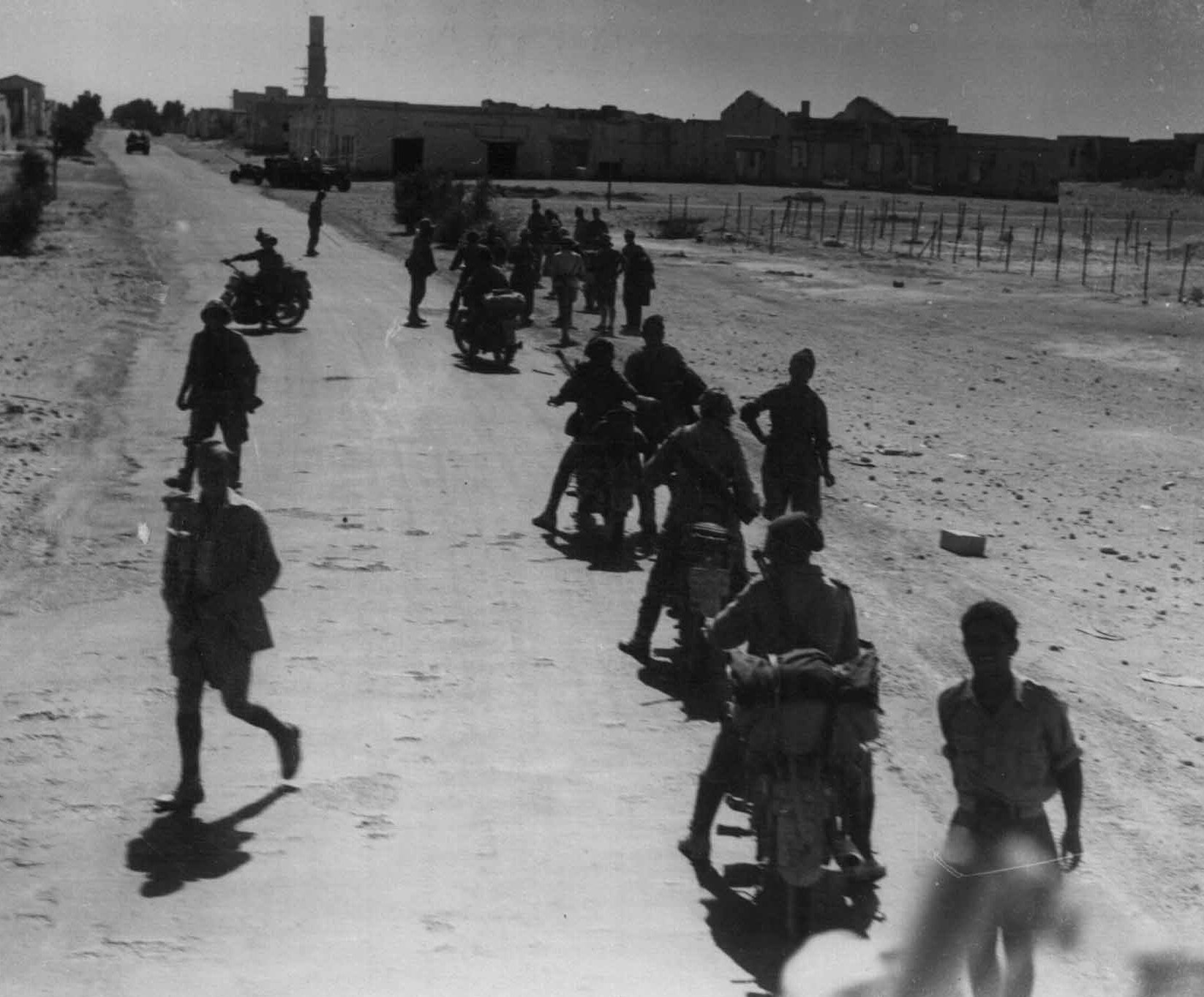
Italian troops entering Mersa Matruh

Panzerarmee Afrika advanced into Egypt after the victory at Gazala in pursuit of the Eighth Army, which made a defensive stand at Mersa Matruh. The speed of advance of the Panzerarmee enabled it to get behind XIII Corps and X Corps but the Axis forces were too weak to prevent the British from escaping. XIII Corps withdrew on the evening of 27 June but poor communication left X Corps on its own in the fortress of Mersa Matruh. X Corps broke out the following night but left 6,000 men and a great deal of equipment and supplies behind. The Eighth Army continued to retreat eastwards, colliding with Axis forces several times en route. An attempt to regroup at Fuka was cancelled and Auchinleck ordered a 99 mi (160 km) retreat all the way to El Alamein, 62 mi (100 km) west of Alexandria. The retreat brought the Eighth Army close to its base, which made supply much more efficient and the geographical bottleneck of the Qattara Depression, 40 mi (64 km) to the south, made an Axis outflanking move much more difficult. By 25 June, the Afrika Korps was down to 60 tanks and the Italian XX Corps had only 14 operational tanks. Using supplies captured at Tobruk on the frontier and at Marsa Matruh, the Panzerarmee reached El Alamein on 30 June. Supplying the Axis forces so far east of Gazala became much harder as most of their supplies still had to come from Tripoli, 1,400 mi (2,300 km) away.

=== First Battle of El Alamein ===
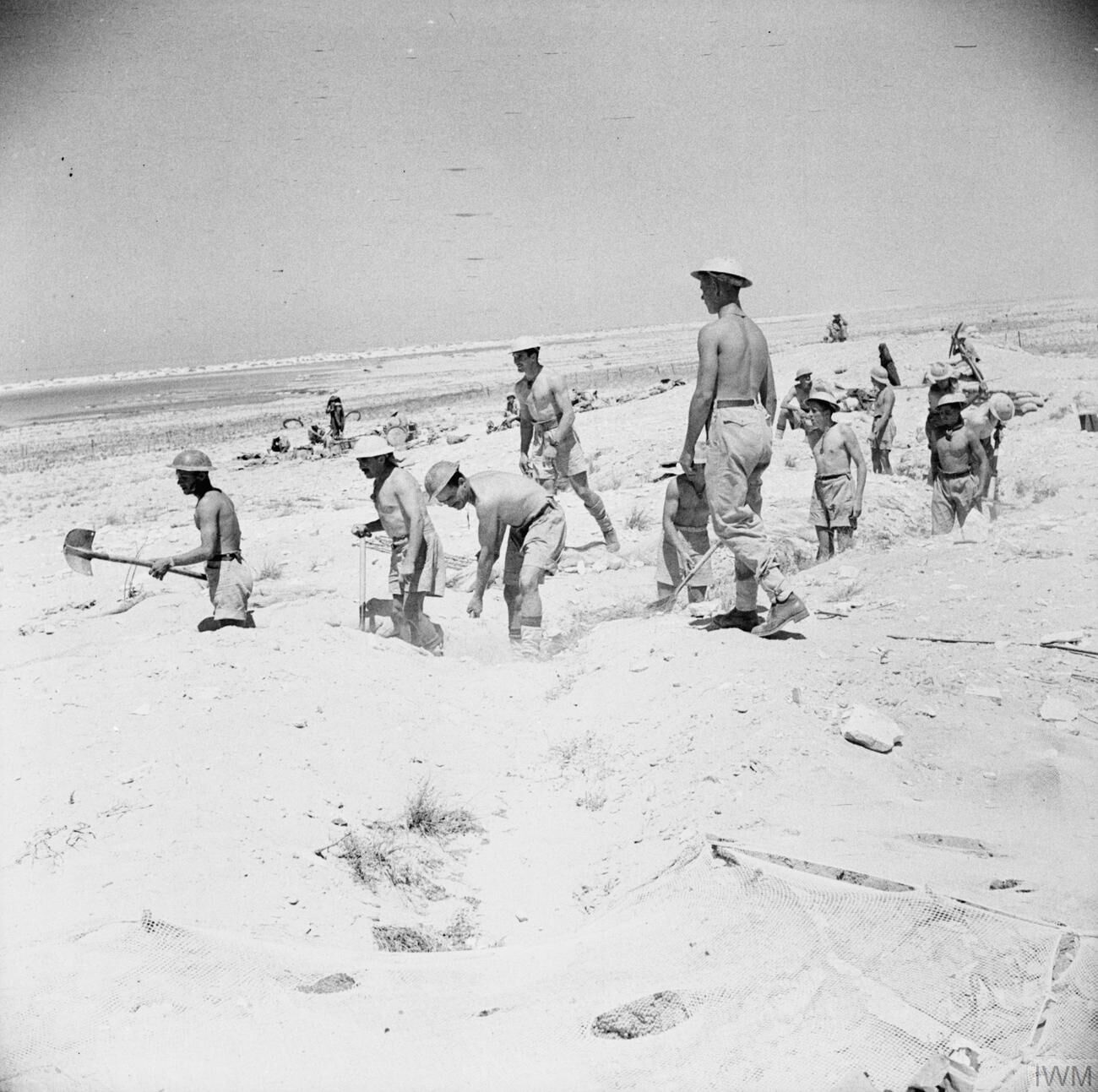
British troops dig in at El Alamein during the battle, 4 July 1942.

An attempt to drive the Eighth Army out of the Alamein position took place in the First Battle of El Alamein (1–27 July 1942). After four days Rommel called off the attempt due to the strength of the Eighth Army defence, depleted Axis supplies and dwindling forces, with German divisions down to 1,200–1,500 men each. By 5 July, the number of serviceable German tanks fell to around thirty. After a lull, the Panzerarmee planned to attack again, with about fifty German tanks, 2,100 German infantry, 54 Italian tanks and 1,600 Italian troops but the Eighth Army attacked first, at Tel el Eisa from 10 to 14 July, which exhausted both sides. The Eighth Army began to attack Italian units, located with information from Ultra, at Ruweisat Ridge (14–17 July) and from 21 to 23 July, again at Tel El Eisa on 22 July and Miteirya Ridge (22 and 26 July), after which another lull fell. The Germans suffered about 10,000 casualties; Italian casualties are unknown but 7,000 Axis prisoners were taken, against 13,250 Eighth Army casualties.

=== Battle of Alam el Halfa ===
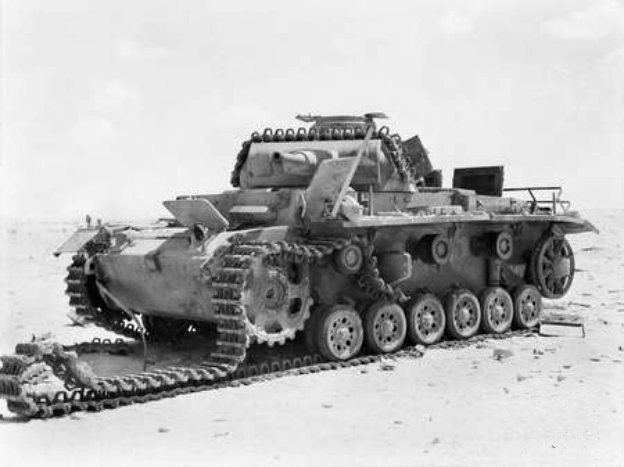
Knocked out Panzer III near El Alamein, 1942

Lieutenant-General Bernard Montgomery took command of the Eighth Army in mid-August. Rommel tried to destroy the British and reach Cairo before Allied reinforcements, due in September, made an Axis victory in Africa impossible. Panzerarmee Afrika was in poor condition and the physique of many of the Germans had declined due to climate and battle exhaustion; 19,000 German troops had been in Africa since March 1941. Reinforcements had brought the four German divisions up to 90,000 men, 17,000 men below establishment and 12,600 vehicles. Only 34,000 of these men were fighting troops. The Panzerarmee had accumulated about 200 German and 243 Italian tanks, vs. 700 British tanks. In the Battle of Alam el Halfa (Unternehmen Brandung, 30 August – 5 September), Axis units sought to surround the Eighth Army by advancing around its southern flank.

The British were forewarned by Ultra (decoded German radio messages) and left only patrols in the south. The bulk of the British tanks and guns were concentrated at the Alam el Halfa Ridge, which blocked the Axis advance 20 mi (32 km) behind the front. The tanks stayed on the ridge and fought a static defensive engagement, rather than a battle of manoeuvre. Allied aircraft bombed and strafed Axis troops continuously from 30 August to 4 September, which destroyed few tanks but pinned them down and denied fast manoeuvring and concentration to the Panzerarmee. Axis attacks on the ridge failed, supplies ran short and Rommel ordered a withdrawal on 2 September. Late on 3 September, a New Zealand brigade and a British brigade counter-attacked to cut off the Axis retreat but Operation Beresford was a costly failure and by 5 September the Axis retreat was complete. The Eighth Army lost 1,750 men and 68 tanks; the Axis lost 2,900 men, 49 tanks, 36 aircraft, 60 guns and 400 lorries.

=== Second Battle of El Alamein ===
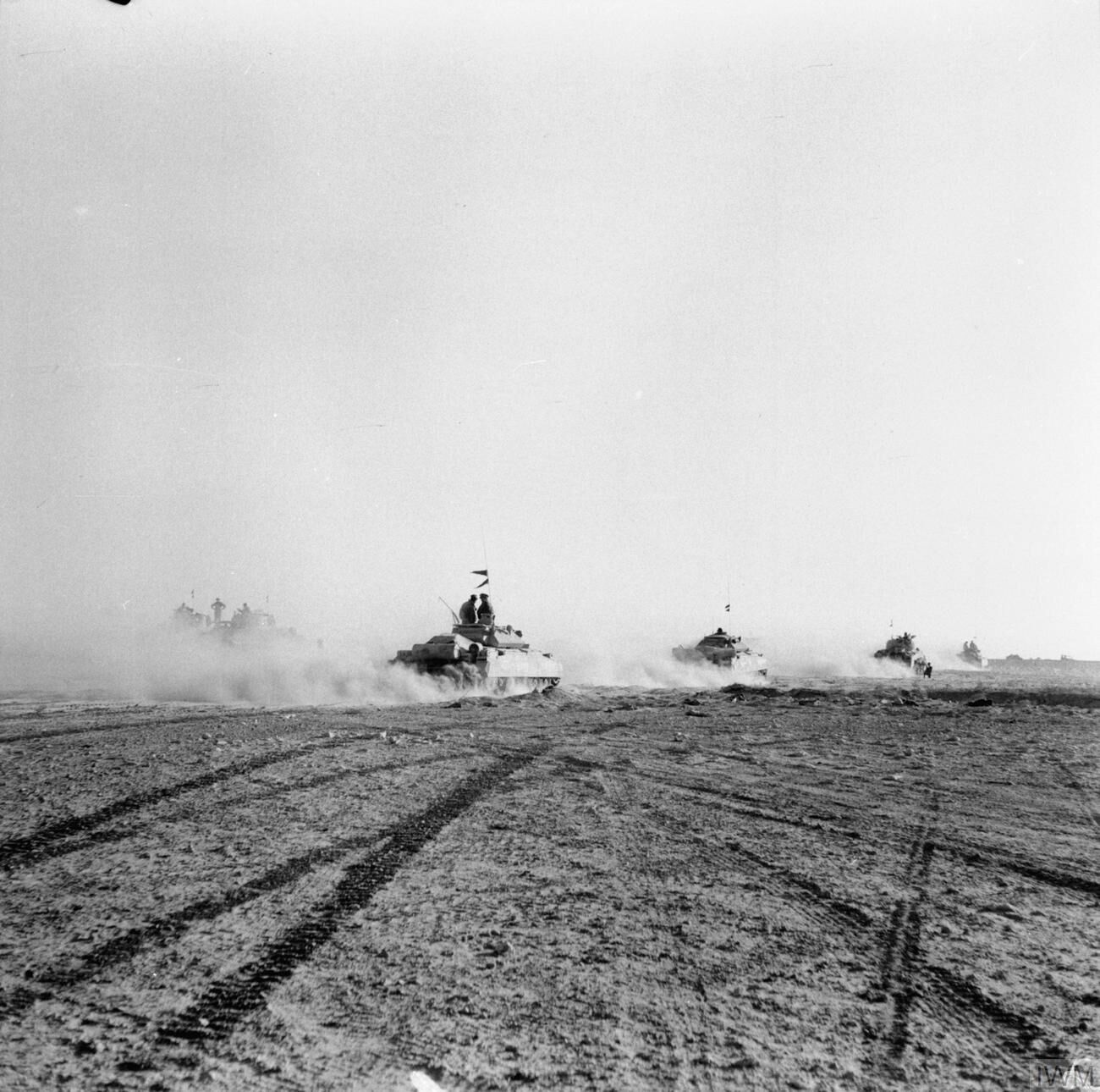
British tanks moving forwards through gaps in Axis minefields, cleared by Allied engineers and infantry, to engage German and Italian armour

When the Eighth Army offensive began on 23 October, the Panzerarmee had 104,000 men, including 50,000 Germans, of whom only 24,173 were front line troops. There were 496 Axis tanks, 290 of which were Italian, 500 guns and 850 anti-tank guns. The Eighth Army had 195,000 men, 1,029 tanks, another 1,000 under repair, 908 guns and 1,451 anti-tank guns. The Allied troops were well fed and in good health, whereas the Axis troops were undernourished and susceptible to illness. The Panzerarmee had only 180 mi (290 km) of fuel per vehicle. By 27 October, the Panzerarmee was down to 114 German tanks and by 2 November the Panzerarmee had expended most of its ammunition and had only 32 German and 120 Italian tanks left. Rommel decided to retreat but Hitler ordered the Panzerarmee to stand fast. On 4 November, the Eighth Army broke through Axis defences and Rommel ordered the retreat to begin, abandoning the non-motorized units, particularly Italian formations, in the centre and south.

Panzerarmee Afrika had suffered 37,000 casualties, 30 per cent of the force and had lost 450 tanks, and 1,000 guns. The Eighth Army suffered 13,500 casualties, a far smaller proportion of the force and 500 tanks (only 150 of them destroyed) and about 110 guns (mainly anti-tank guns). The Panzerarmee was reduced to about 5,000 men, 20 tanks, 20 anti-tank guns and 50 field guns. Attempts to encircle the Axis forces at Marsa Matruh failed and the bulk of the Afrika Korps had escaped by 7 November. The Axis forces retreated along the coast road but lack of tanks and fuel for a mobile defence of the open southern flank, made a stand at the Halfaya Pass or any other position impossible. Tobruk was retaken by the Eighth Army on 13 November and the Axis retreat continued; Benghazi fell on 20 November and the captured ports were quickly repaired to supply the British advance.

=== Battle of El Agheila ===
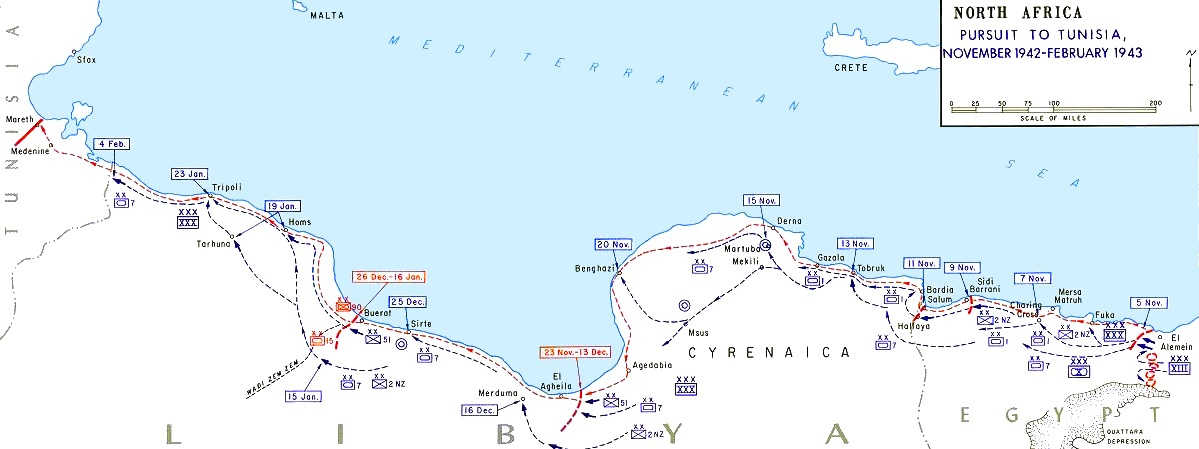
Pursuit of the Axis forces through Egypt and Libya (enlargeable)

Panzerarmee Afrika retired to the El Agheila defences (Mersa Brega line) but Axis supply and reinforcement priority was given to the forces opposing the British First Army (Lieutenant-General Kenneth Anderson) and Operation Torch, leaving the Italo-Germans with no capacity to counter-attack. Hitler ordered the Mersa Brega line to be held at all costs but Rommel favoured a fighting retreat to the Gabès Gap in Tunisia, which would increase the supply distance for the Eighth Army to 1,500 mi (2,400 km). On 24 November, Ugo Cavallero agreed to withdraw 200 mi (320 km) west to Buerat, 50 mi (80 km) beyond Sirte, if the Panzerarmee was attacked by a superior force. The Eighth Army reached El Agheila on 15 December and the New Zealand Division was sent to outflank the Marsa Brega line from 14 to 16 December as the 51st (Highland) Division attacked frontally and the 7th Armoured Division attacked inland at Bir el Auera. The outflanking move failed with the loss of 18 tanks and the Panzerarmee retreated behind an obstacle course of deep mine-fields and booby-traps, which slowed the pursuit.

==== Axis supply: 1942 ====
El Agheila is 460 mi (740 km) closer to Tripoli than the Egyptian frontier; the arrival of the second Italian battleship convoy on 6 January 1942 and the discovery of 13,000 long tons (13,000 t) of fuel at Tripoli, eased the supply crisis, despite the delivery of only 50,000 long tons (51,000 t) of supplies in January. The Panzerarmee had room to manoeuvre and a much shorter supply line against an opponent who now had the burden of an over-extended supply line. The arrival of the Luftflotte II in Sicily had also restored Axis air superiority in the region. Rommel asked for another 8,000 lorries but this utopian demand was rejected and Rommel was warned that an advance would cause another supply crisis. On 29 January, the Panzerarmee recaptured Benghazi and next day ammunition supply to the front line broke down. By 13 February Rommel had agreed to stop at Gazala, 900 mi (1,400 km) from Tripoli.

Until May, monthly deliveries averaged 60,000 long tons (60,963 t), fewer than the smaller Axis force received from June to October 1941 but sufficient for an offensive. The 900 mi (1,400 km) advance to Gazala succeeded because Benghazi was open, reducing the transport distance for about 33 per cent of the supplies of the Panzerarmee to 280 mi (450 km). The Italians tried to restrain Rommel by advocating the capture of Malta, which would postpone another offensive in Africa until autumn but agreed to an attack on Tobruk for late May. An advance would stop at the Egyptian frontier, another 150 mi (240 km) east and the Luftwaffe would redeploy for Operation Herkules. The capture of Malta would not alter the constraints of port capacity and distance; protecting convoys and a large port close to the front would still be necessary for victory.

The capture of Alexandria would have made Malta irrelevant but a defensive strategy would be needed while Benghazi was extended, supplies accumulated and substantial reinforcements brought to Libya. More troops would increase the demand for supplies, which would exceed the capacities of Tripoli and Benghazi and the transport needed to move them. On 26 May, Unternehmen Venezia, the Battle of Gazala, began; Tobruk was captured intact on 22 June and shipping losses barely increased. Deliveries to Libya fell from 150,000–32,000 long tons (152,407–32,514 t), due to a fuel shortage in Italy and the supplies were unloaded at Tripoli, which made the position of the Panzerarmee untenable. Operation Herkules was postponed; the capture of 2,000 vehicles, 5,000 long tons (5,080 t) of supplies and 1,400 long tons (1,422 t) of fuel at Tobruk enabled the Panzerarmee to advance another 400 mi (640 km) by 4 July, when lack of supplies, exhaustion and the rally of the Eighth Army ended the advance.

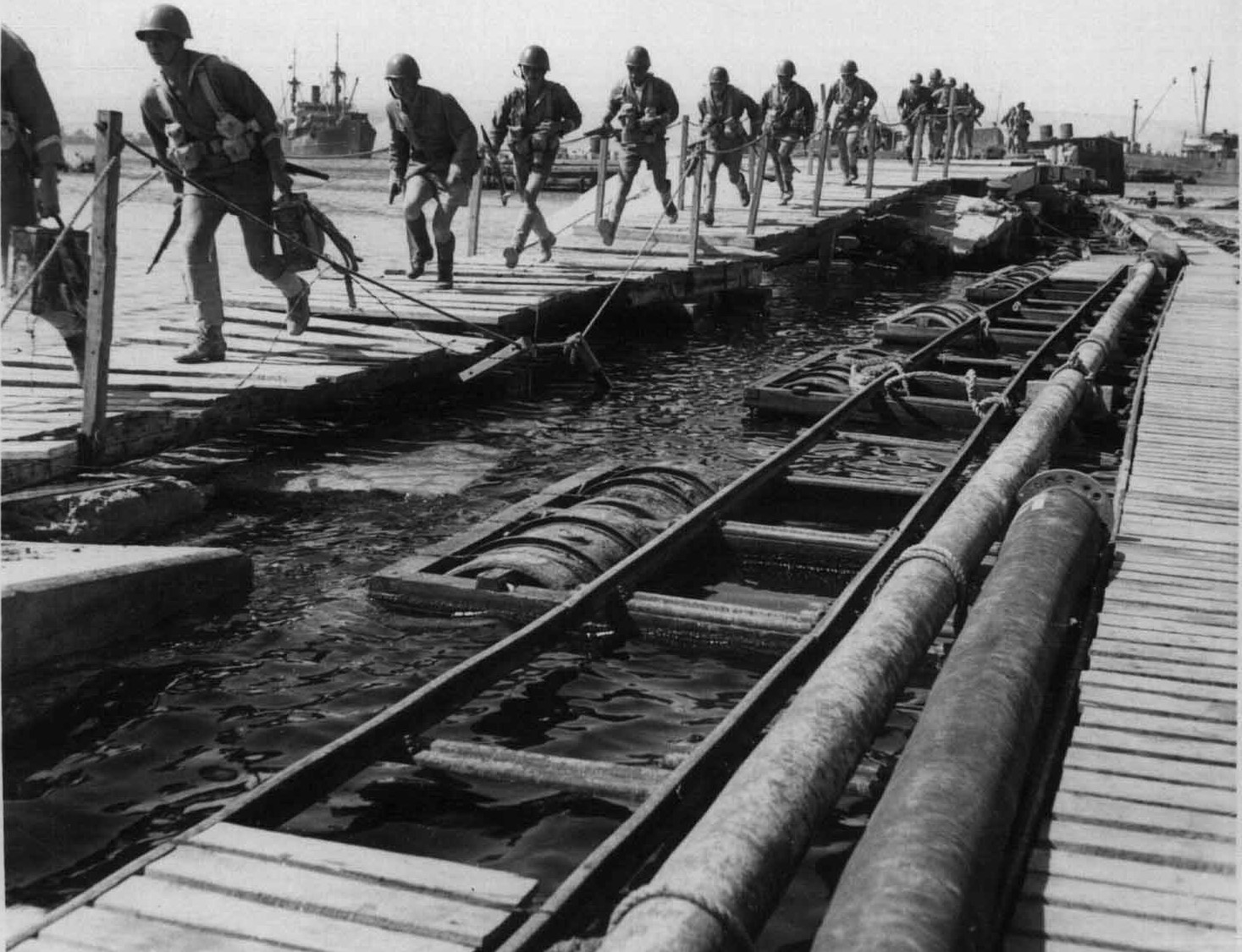
Italian marines disembarking in Tobruk harbour, July 1942

Tobruk could only take 20,000 long tons (20,321 t) of supplies a month, was within DAF bomber range and the railway could carry only 300 long tons (305 t) per day. Small deliveries could be made to Tobruk, Bardia and Marsa Matruh or be landed at Tripoli and Benghazi, 1,300 and 800 mi (2,100 and 1,300 km) away. Ship losses in August rose by 400 per cent and deliveries fell by half, to 51,000 long tons (51,818 t). Supplies were diverted back to Tripoli and the Battle of Alam Halfa consumed 10,000 long tons (10,160 t) of fuel. A retreat from El Alamein was forbidden by Hitler and deliveries fell as far fewer ships were sent from Italy. Shipbuilding, repairs and German replacement ships, had limited the net Italian loss of merchant ships to 23 per cent since 1940. On the eve of the Second Battle of El Alamein, the railway from Tobruk flooded and 10,000 long tons (10,160 t) of supplies were stranded, leaving the Panzerarmee with only ten per cent of the fuel it needed.

== 1943 ==
=== Buerat ===
Rommel planned to defend the Gabes Gap in Tunisia north-west of the French pre-war Mareth line, while Army Group Africa (Generaloberst [Colonel-General] Hans-Jürgen von Arnim), already in Tunisia, confronted the British First Army, which contained the II US Corps and French troops. Rommel had been ordered to hold the port of Buerat, east of Tripoli. The front was 400 mi (640 km) from Tobruk and with such supply difficulties, the Eighth Army was unable to use all its strength. Buerat was not strongly defended and despite intelligence on the state of the Axis forces, Montgomery paused until 16 January 1943, when the Eighth Army had a 4:1 superiority in infantry and a 7.5:1 superiority in tanks. Bombing began on 12 January and XXX Corps attacked on 15 January, picking its way along the coast road through minefields, demolitions and booby-traps. The 2nd New Zealand Division and the 7th Armoured Division turned inland via Tarhuna, supplied by the Royal Army Service Corps (RASC) and the New Zealand Army Service Corps. The Eighth Army needed to capture the port quickly to avoid a supply shortage. Rommel withdrew from Buerat on 15 January, retreated from Tripoli on the night of 22/23 January, after destroying the port and then conducted a delaying action into Tunisia. The 7th Armoured Division entered Tripoli on 23 January; the last elements of Panzerarmee reached the Mareth line, another 200 mi (320 km) west, on 15 February, as LRDG patrols surveyed the defences.

=== Tripoli ===
The main British attack was made along the coast road by the 51st (Highland) Division and an armoured brigade as the 7th Armoured Division advanced via Tarhuna, Castel Benito and Tripoli. The 90th Light Division fought delaying actions along the road, which exacerbated Allied transport difficulties. From 20 to 21 January, the 90th Light Division made a stand at Corradini, having made 109 craters in the road from Buerat to Homs. The vanguard of the 7th Armoured Division reached the vicinity of Aziza on 21 January and next day the 51st (Highland) Division reached Castel Verde. A race developed and the Germans retired from Tripoli during the night; the 11th Hussars were the first into Tripoli, 675 mi (1,086 km) west of Benghazi, on the morning of 23 January. Five hours later, a Naval Base Party arrived and surveyed the wreckage of the port. On 26 January, five ships anchored outside the port and began to unload via lighters; on 30 January, 3,000 long tons (3,000 t) of stores were landed. In March the Eighth Army entered Tunisia and on 9 March, Rommel returned to Germany to communicate to Hitler the realities of conditions in North Africa. Rommel failed to persuade Hitler to allow the Axis forces to be withdrawn and was not allowed to return to Africa, ostensibly on health grounds.

== Aftermath ==
=== Analysis ===
In 1977, Martin van Creveld wrote that Rommel had claimed that if the supplies and equipment, sent to Tunisia in late 1942 and early 1943, had been sent earlier, the Axis would have won the Desert War. Creveld disagreed, since only the German occupation of southern France after Operation Torch made French merchant ships and Toulon available for dispatch and Bizerta available for receipt, which did not apply in 1941. The extra distance from Bizerta to the Egyptian border would also have negated the benefit of using a larger port. Axis supply had always been determined by the small size of the ports in Libya, a constraint that could not be overcome and attacks on Axis shipping had compounded chronic supply difficulties. With the German army bogged down in the USSR, there was never sufficient road transport available for the Afrika Korps and the Panzerarmee, despite the relatively lavish scale of transport compared to other fronts.

The cancelled attack on Malta in the summer of 1942 had less influence on events than the small size of Tobruk harbour and its vulnerability to air attack. Only a railway, similar to the one built by the British, could have alleviated Axis supply difficulties but lack of time and resources made it impossible to build one. The influence of Axis ship losses on the defeats inflicted on the Panzerarmee in late 1942 has been exaggerated, because lack of fuel was caused by the chronic difficulty of transporting goods overland, rather than lack of deliveries from Europe. During the Second Battle of El Alamein, 1/3 of the fuel destined for the Panzerarmee, was stranded at Benghazi. Rommel wrote that Axis supply difficulties, relative to those of the British, determined the course of the military campaign and were a constraint that was insoluble.

Montgomery has been criticised for failing to trap the Axis armies and bring them to a decisive battle in Libya. His tactics have been seen as too cautious and slow, since he knew of the exiguous supply situation of the Panzerarmee and Rommel's intentions from Axis signals decrypts and other intelligence. In 1966, the British official historian Ian Playfair wrote that the defensive ability of the Afrika Korps in particular and British apprehensions of another defeat and retreat, would have constrained the freedom of action of any commander. Warfare in the desert has been described as a "quarter-master's nightmare", given the conditions of desert warfare and the supply difficulties. Montgomery emphasised balance and refrained from attacks until the army was ready; Eighth Army morale greatly improved under his command. The Axis forces retreated through Libya into Tunisia and fought the Tunisian campaign, eventually to be trapped between the Anglo-American forces of the First Army to the west and the Eighth Army from the east.

== See also ==
- Egypt in World War II
- Egypt–Libya Campaign
- List of British military equipment of World War II
- List of German military equipment of World War II
- List of Italian Army equipment in World War II
- List of World War II battles
- Military history of Italy during World War II
- Military history of the United Kingdom during World War II
- Nazi Germany
- Timeline of the North African campaign

== Bibliography ==
=== Books ===
- Athanasiadis, Giorgis (1971). Η Πρώτη Πράξη της Ελληνικής Τραγωδίας [The First Act of the Greek Tragedy] (in Greek). Eleutheri Ellada. OCLC 66166774.
- Barr, Niall (2005) [2004]. Pendulum of War: The Three Battles of El Alamein. Woodstock, NY: Overlook Press. ISBN 978-1-58567-738-2.
- Bauer, Eddy (2000) [1979]. Peter, Young (ed.). The History of World War II (rev. ed.). London: Orbis. ISBN 978-1-85605-552-9.
- Bekker, Cajus (1975). The Luftwaffe War Diaries. New York: Ballantine Books. ISBN 978-0-306-80604-9.
- Bierman, John; Smith, Colin (2002). The Battle of Alamein: Turning Point, World War II. New York: Viking. ISBN 978-0-670-03040-8 – via Archive Foundation.
- Carver, M. (2002) [1986]. Dilemmas of the Desert War: The Libyan Campaign 1940–1942 (Spellmount ed.). Staplehurst: Batsford. ISBN 978-1-86227-153-1.
- Clodfelter, Micheal (2017). Warfare and Armed Conflicts: A Statistical Encyclopedia of Casualty and other Figures, 1492–2015 (4th ed.). McFarland. ISBN 978-0-7864-7470-7.
- Cooper, Matthew (1978). The German Army 1933–1945: Its Political and Military Failure. Briarcliff Manor, NY: Stein and Day. ISBN 978-0-8128-2468-1.
- Creveld, M. van (1977). Supplying War: Logistics from Wallenstein to Patton. Cambridge: Cambridge University Press. ISBN 978-0-521-29793-6.
- Edgerton, D. (2011). Britain's War Machine: Weapons, Resources and Experts in the Second World War. London: Allen Lane. ISBN 978-0-713-99918-1.
- Freivogel, Zvonimir (2022). Warships of the Royal Yugoslav Navy 1918–1945. Zagreb: Despot Infinitus. ISBN 978-953-8218-72-9.
- Green, William (1970). Warplanes of the Third Reich. New York: Doubleday. ISBN 978-0-385-05782-0.
- Greene, J.; Massignani, A. (2002) [1998]. The Naval War in the Mediterranean 1940–1943 (pbk. ed.). Rochester: Chatham. ISBN 978-1-86176-190-3.
- Greene, J.; Massignani, A. (1999). Rommel's North Africa campaign: September 1940 – November 1942. Great Campaigns. Cambridge, MA: Da Capo. ISBN 978-1-58097-018-1.
- Hinsley, F. H.; Thomas, E. E.; Ransom, C. F. G.; Knight, R. C. (1981). British Intelligence in the Second World War. Its influence on Strategy and Operations. History of the Second World War. Vol. II. London: HMSO. ISBN 978-0-11-630934-1.
- Hinsley, F. H. (1994) [1993]. British Intelligence in the Second World War. Its influence on Strategy and Operations (abridged). History of the Second World War (2nd rev. pbk. ed.). London: HMSO. ISBN 978-0-11-630961-7.
- Hoffman, K. (2004). Erwin Rommel. London: Brassey's. ISBN 978-1-85753-374-3.
- Latimer, Jon (2002). Alamein. London: John Murray. ISBN 978-0-7195-6203-7.
- Latimer, Jon (2003) [2002]. Alamein. London: John Murray. ISBN 978-0-7195-6213-6.
- Lewin, Ronald (1998) [1968]. Rommel As Military Commander. New York: B&N Books. ISBN 978-0-7607-0861-3 – via Archive foundation.
- Luck, Hans von (1989). Panzer Commander: The Memoirs of Colonel Hans von Luck. New York: Dell (Random House). ISBN 978-0-440-20802-0.
- Mackenzie, Compton (1951). Eastern Epic: September 1939 – March 1943 Defence. Vol. I. London: Chatto & Windus. OCLC 1412578.
- Macksey, Kenneth (1971). Beda Fomm: Classic Victory. Ballantine's Illustrated History of the Violent Century. New York: Ballantine Books. OCLC 473687868.
- MacGregor, Andrew (2006) [2006]. A Military History of Modern Egypt: From the Ottoman Conquest to the Ramadan War. Santa Barbara, CA: Praeger Security International General Interest. ISBN 978-0-275-98601-8 – via Archive foundation.
- Marcon, Tullio (1998). I Muli del Mare [The Sea of Donkeys] (in Italian) (3rd ed.). Parma: Albertelli. ISBN 978-88-87372-02-1.
- Maurer, Maurer, ed. (1983) [1961]. Air Force Combat Units of World War II (repr. ed.). Washington, DC: Office of Air Force History. ISBN 0-912799-02-1. LCCN 61060979.
- Mead, Richard (2007). Churchill's Lions: A Biographical Guide to the Key British Generals of World War II. Stroud: Spellmount. ISBN 978-1-86227-431-0.
- Neillands, Robin (2004). Eighth Army: From the Western Desert to the Alps, 1939–1945. John Murray. ISBN 978-0-7195-5647-0.
- Pitt, Barrie (1989). Crucible of War: Western Desert 1941. Vol. I (New ed.). Paragon House. ISBN 978-1-55778-232-8.
- Playfair, I. S. O.; with Stitt, G. M. S.; Molony, Brigadier C. J. C. & Toomer, S. E. (2004d) [1st. pub. HMSO 1954]. Butler, J. R. M. (ed.). The Mediterranean and Middle East: The Early Successes Against Italy (to May 1941). History of the Second World War, United Kingdom Military Series. Vol. I. Naval & Military Press. ISBN 978-1-84574-065-8.
- Playfair, I. S. O.; with Flynn, F. C.; Molony, C. J. C. & Toomer, S. E. (2004a) [HMSO 1956]. Butler, J. R. M. (ed.). The Mediterranean and Middle East: The Germans Come to the Help of their Ally (1941). History of the Second World War, United Kingdom Military Series. Vol. II. Naval & Military Press. ISBN 978-1-84574-066-5.
- Playfair, I. S. O.; with Flynn, F. C.; Molony, C. J. C. & Gleave, T. P. (2004b) [1960]. Butler, J. R. M. (ed.). The Mediterranean and Middle East: British Fortunes reach their Lowest Ebb (September 1941 to September 1942). History of the Second World War United Kingdom Military Series. Vol. III. Naval & Military Press. ISBN 978-1-84574-067-2.
- Playfair, I. S. O.; and Molony, C. J. C.; with Flynn, F. C. & Gleave, T. P. (2004c) [1966]. Butler, J. R. M. (ed.). The Mediterranean and Middle East: The Destruction of the Axis Forces in Africa. History of the Second World War United Kingdom Military Series. Vol. IV (pbk. repr. Naval & Military Press, Uckfield ed.). London: HMSO. ISBN 978-1-84574-068-9.
- Porch, Douglas (2005) [2004]. Hitler's Mediterranean Gamble (Cassell Military Paperbacks ed.). London: Weidenfeld & Nicolson. ISBN 978-0-304-36705-4.
- Raugh, H. E. (1993). Wavell in the Middle East, 1939–1941: A Study in Generalship. London: Brassey's. ISBN 978-0-08-040983-2.
- Rommel, Erwin (1982) [1953]. Liddell Hart, Basil (ed.). The Rommel Papers. New York: Da Capo Press. ISBN 978-0-306-80157-0.
- Schenk, Peter (1990). Invasion of England 1940: The Planning of Operation Sealion. London: Conway Maritime Press. ISBN 978-0-85177-548-7.
- Shores, Christopher; Massimello, Giovanni; Guest, Russell; Olynyk, Frank; Bock, Winfried (2014). A History of the Mediterranean Air War, 1940–1945: North African Desert, February 1942 – March 1943. Vol. II. London: Grub Street. ISBN 978-1-91-069097-0.
- Smetana, Vit (2020). Geaney, Kathleen (ed.). Exile in London: The Experience of Czechoslovakia and the Other Occupied Nations, 1939–1945. Charles University in Prague: Karolinum Press. ISBN 978-8-02-463701-3.
- Watson, B. A. (2007) [1999]. Exit Rommel: The Tunisian Campaign, 1942–43. Mechanicsburg, PA: Stackpole. ISBN 978-0-8117-3381-6.

=== Journals ===
- Greene, Jack; Massignani, Alessandro (January–February 1993). "The Summer of '42: The Proposed Axis Invasion of Malta". Command Magazine (20). Conshohocken, PA. ISSN 1059-5651.
- Jenner, C. J. (2008). "Turning the Hinge of Fate: Good Source and the UK–US Intelligence Alliance, 1940–1942". Diplomatic History. 32 (2). London: Society for Historians of American Foreign Relations (Oxford University Press): 165–205. doi:10.1111/j.1467-7709.2008.00688.x. ISSN 0145-2096.
- Wavell, Archibald (1946). Despatch on Operations in the Middle East from August, 1939 to November, 1940. London: War Office. "No. 37609". The London Gazette (Supplement). 13 June 1946. pp. 2997–3006.
- Wavell, Archibald (1946). Despatch on Operations in the Western Desert From 7th December, 1940 to 7th February 1941. London: War Office. in "No. 37628". The London Gazette (Supplement). 26 June 1946. pp. 3261–3269.
- Wavell, Archibald (1946). Despatch on Operations in the Middle East From 7th February, 1941 to 15th July 1941. London: War Office. in "No. 37638". The London Gazette (Supplement). 3 July 1946. pp. 3423–3444.

=== Reports ===
- Roberts, G. P. B.; Bayerlein, Fritz (1956). Liddell Hart, Basil (ed.). Battle Report: Alam Halfa (Report). Fort Leavenworth, KS: Combat Studies Institute, US Army Command and General Staff College. OCLC 464601329. Archived from the original on 21 October 2007.
- Toppe, Alfred (1990) [~1947]. German Experiences in Desert Warfare during World War II (PDF). The Black Vault (Report). Vol. II. Washington: US Marine Corps: Historical Division, European Command. FMFRP 12-96-II.

=== Theses ===
- Christie, Howard R. (1999). Fallen Eagles: The Italian 10th Army in the Opening Campaign in the Western Desert, June 1940 – December 1940 (MA thesis). Fort Leavenworth, KS: US Army Command and General Staff College. OCLC 465212715. A116763. Archived from the original on 16 February 2015.

=== Websites ===
- "Appendix E, H.Q. Cyrenaica Command Intelligence Summary No. 6 (23 Feb 41)" (23 February 1941). War Office, WO 169/1258. The National Archives.
- "Engagements, 1942". The History of the British 7th Armoured Division. 2001.
