= Royal Yugoslav Guards Battalion =

- Active: 1941–May 1944
- Country: (Kingdom of Yugoslavia) Yugoslavia; British India
- Allegiance: Yugoslav government-in-exile
- Branch: Yugoslav Army Outside the Homeland; British Indian Army
- Size: Battalion
- Part of: 4th Indian Division (1941–1943); 10th Indian Division (1943–1944)
- Engagements: World War II: North African Campaign; Western Desert campaign

The Royal Yugoslav Guards Battalion was an infantry formation of the Yugoslav Army Outside the Homeland in World War II.

Formed in Cairo in 1941 as the 1st Battalion, Royal Yugoslav Guards, it consisted of Yugoslav soldiers who escaped capture during the April War and Slovene and Croatian prisoners of war of the Royal Italian Army. It was attached to the 4th Indian Division and saw service in the Western Desert Campaign until the unit's transfer to Mandatory Palestine in 1943. In June 1943, the unit was reassigned to the 10th Indian Division. In September 1942, the battalion consisted of 741 soldiers and officers and by January 1943, recruitment and liberation from Italian prison camps raised the number to 850 men.

During its service in the Western Desert Campaign, the battalion's primary duties were guarding important installations and preparing defensive positions in the desert. Due to concerns that over half of the enlisted men in the unit were ethnic Slovenes chosen from the ranks of captured soldiers of the Royal Italian Army, the unit was transferred to Haifa. The battalion was subject to significant internal strife upon its transfer to Palestine, with many soldiers demanding transfer to fight for the Yugoslav Partisans in their homeland. The unit was ultimately disbanded in May 1944. The majority of men transferred to the Partisans, though some remained in service with the British Army.

== See also ==
- Sacred Band
- Balkan Air Force
- Greek Armed Forces in the Middle East
