= Yugoslav Army Outside the Fatherland =

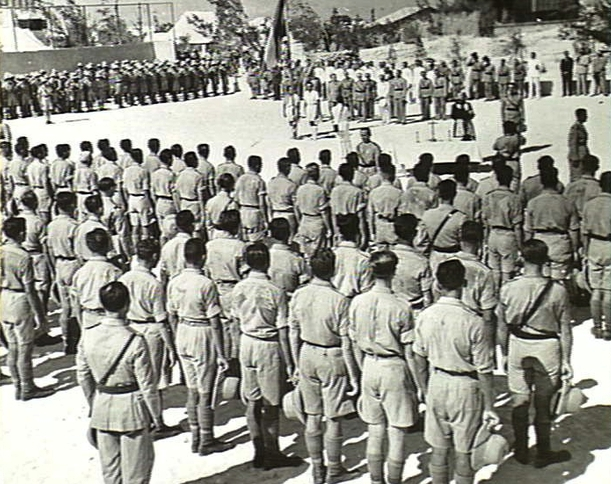
Yugoslav recruits in North Africa

Yugoslav Army Outside the Fatherland (Serbo-Croatian: Југословенска војска ван отаџбине, Jugoslovenska vojska van otadžbine; Slovene: Jugoslovanska vojska zunaj domovine) is the term for members of the Royal Yugoslav Army who managed to escape capture during the Axis invasion of Yugoslavia. This part of the Yugoslav Аrmy numbered from 980 to 1158 people, mostly members of the navy and air force who were stationed in Egypt and the Middle East, and participated in the North African campaign. Only this part of the army was under the direct command of the Yugoslav government-in-exile. Over two thousand additional Yugoslav personnel were recruited as prisoners of war from the ranks of the Royal Italian Army in North Africa in 1942-43, but these troops were subsequently committed to the British Auxiliary Military Pioneer Corps. Special Yugoslav military missions operated throughout the war in Palestine, the United States, Canada, South Africa, and South America to recruit Yugoslav émigrés and defectors to join the Yugoslav and allied forces in the Middle East and North Africa.

== History ==
=== Formation ===
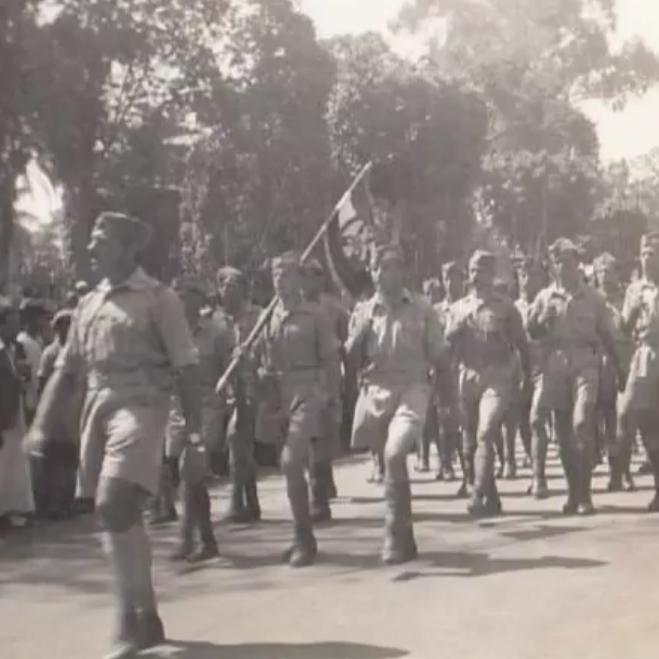
Yugoslav soldiers at a parade in Cairo

A group of high-ranking officers led by the Prime Minister and Army General Dušan Simović, the Minister of the Army and Navy Bogoljub Ilić and the Commander of the Air Force, Brigadier General Borivoje Mirković together with members of the government and King Peter II left the Kingdom of Yugoslavia on 15 April 1941 from Nikšić via Greece for Palestine and Egypt. The break-up and collapse of the Yugoslav Army in April 1941, disorganization and devastation forced the airmen to cope on their own in difficult circumstances. Several planes flew over the territory of the Soviet Union. A number of airmen left the mainland from Macedonia to Greece and further by ships to the Middle East. On 17 April, seaplanes flew eight flights from the Bay of Kotor to Greece. They flew to Alexandria via Corfu, Athens and Crete on 23 April 1941. Twenty three more aviators and passengers evaded capture aboard four SM.79 trimotor aircraft which flew Northeast from Mostar to Bessarabia in the Soviet Union. Following Operation Barbarossa, this group was sent from Moscow to Jordan to rendezvous with their countrymen. Individuals and smaller groups of the land army withdrew from Macedonia on their own initiative. The gathering was held in the territories of Egypt and Jordan. From that day on, the evacuated army that escaped capture during the capitulation was named the Yugoslav Army Outside the Fatherland.

On 21 July 1941, General Ilić submitted a report to Prime Minister Simović, on the number of members of the exiled army in Cairo. The number of evacuated members by army consisted of the army: 38 officers, 16 non-commissioned officers, 26 corporals and ranks, and from the navy: 15 officers, 1 mechanical officer, 1 civil engineering officer, 1 medical officer, 67 non-commissioned officers, 9 corporals and ranks. There were the most members of the aviation: 103 officers, 100 non-commissioned officers, 37 corporals and ranks.

=== Development and operations ===
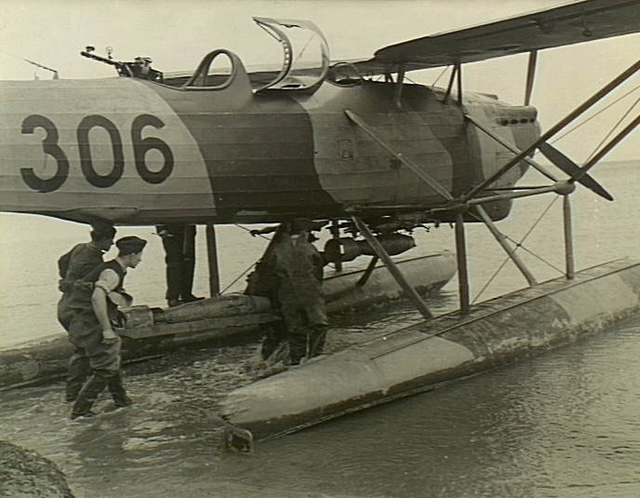
Personnel arming a Dornier Do 22 floatplane of the No. 2 Yugoslav Floatplane Squadron in Aboukir, February 1942

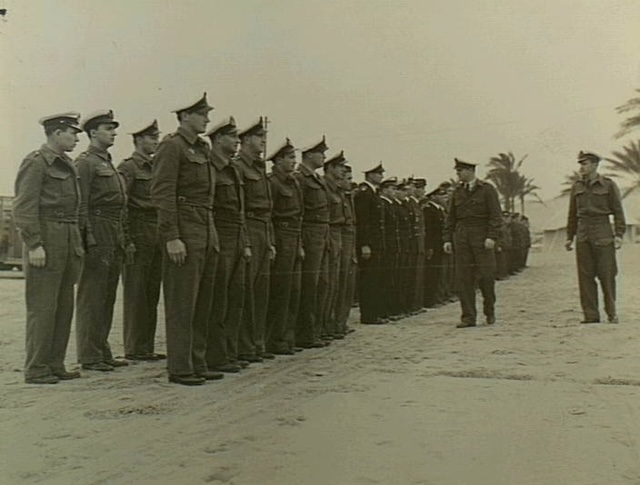
Inspection of Royal Yugoslav Air Force personnel in Egypt, February 1942

During 1941, a Yugoslav air squadron, consisting of 3 squadrons (fighter, bomber and marine squadron), was to be formed from the fleeing airmen with the help of the British. Only marine and fighter squadrons were formed, and the bomber was not. At the request of the British, the hunting squadron was disbanded after about 15 days. Later, an air force command was formed. A marine squadron was formed in Aboukir from aviators who fled from the Bay of Kotor in April 1941. It joined the British No. 230 Squadron, which defended the wider region of Alexandria, rescued fallen and stray crews and discovered enemy vessels. Of the weapons, it had eight Dornier Do 22 and two Rogožarski SIM-XIV-H seaplanes with which it flew from Yugoslavia to Africa. From April 1941 to April 1942, the squadron carried out 737 combat missions.

At the end of April 1942, the hydro squadron ceased combat operations because of the dilapidation of the seaplanes with which they flew in from Yugoslavia, and the new allies did not assign them. The Supreme Command of the Royal Army had a Guards Battalion, composed of prisoners from Istria and the Slovenian Littoral, an air force and a naval detachment. The entire Yugoslav Army Outside the Fatherland numbered 980 people. Yugoslav pilots and airmen were assigned to a number of squadrons of the Royal Air Force and served in the North African and Italian campaigns. The last plane to conduct a bombing during the Italian campaign was a Yugoslav-crewed Martin Baltimore of the No. 55 Squadron RAF. In September 1942, it was decided that 108 Yugoslav Air Force personnel were to be sent to the RAF training centre in Southern Rhodesia and 40 would be sent for training in the United States. The Yugoslav Navy in exile at the same time consisted of two torpedo boats and one submarine, 26 officers, 28 non-commissioned officers, and 45 seamen, under the command of Ivan Kern. The three Yugoslav-manned ships, Durmitor, Nebojša, and Kajmakčalan, subsequently saw service as convoy escort vessels along the Egyptian coast.

From December 1942, there was a Yugoslav military mission in Algiers, which focused on recruiting Yugoslav soldiers among the Italian POWs in North Africa. Approximately 2,200 soldiers were recruited to join the Royal Yugoslav Guards Battalion at this mission. However, due to the shift of British support towards Tito and the Partisans, these troops were refused passage to Cairo and were instead organized as Labour Companies 386-388 of the British Auxiliary Military Pioneer Corps. That same month, Royal Yugoslav Air Force personnel in North Africa were transferred to various air ferrying units of the RAF. Defections from the Italian and Croatian armed forces also helped increase the number of Yugoslav personnel in the Middle East and North Africa, such as in the case of ZNDH pilot Milan Delić and his crew, who in July 1942 flew their Bristol Blenheim to the Middle East to defect to the Allies, after which they flew for the RAF.

=== Problems and disbandment ===
Mass cancellation of obedience to the elders and defections to the Overseas Brigades of the National Liberation Army were daily occurrences after 1 January 1944. The disobedient were disarmed and on 15 April 1944, about 1158 officers, non-commissioned officers and fighters gathered, ready to join the Yugoslav Partisans. A considerable number of royal airmen did not immediately declare themselves for the National Liberation War. Some waited for the situation to clear up, so individuals and smaller groups declared themselves by the end of 1944, and some even in 1945. A number of officers and soldiers did not want to join the Partisans. They remained abroad, and some of them actively worked against the Democratic Federal Yugoslavia after the war.

=== Merchant Marine ===
In addition to the elements of the army, navy, and air force that evaded capture and continued the fight in North Africa, 75 vessels of the Yugoslav Merchant Marine were located outside of the country when the April 1941 invasion occurred. These ships and their crews participated in the allied convoys transporting war materials across the Atlantic and Pacific for the remainder of the war. 54 ships and 420 seamen of the Yugoslav Merchant Marine were lost at sea by the end of the war.

== Notable units ==
- Royal Yugoslav Guards Battalion (1941–1944)
- No. 7 (Yugoslav) Troop of the 10th (Inter-Allied) Commando (1943–1944)
- Royal Yugoslav Air Force Detachment (1943–1945)
- B Flight, No. 94 Sqn South African Air Force (1943–1944)
- No. 2 (Recon) Squadron (Yugoslav), Aboukir (1941–1942)
- No. 2 Yugoslav (floatplane) Squadron, attached to the No. 230 Squadron RAF, (1941–1942)
- Yugoslav labour companies 386-388, Auxiliary Military Pioneer Corps (1943–1945)

== See also ==
- No. 351 (Yugoslav) Squadron RAF
- No. 352 (Yugoslav) Squadron RAF
- Greek Armed Forces in the Middle East
- Polish Armed Forces in the East
