= Italian invasion of Egypt =

1940 Italian offensive against Egypt

- Part of the Western Desert campaign of the Second World War
- Western Desert 1940
Date	9–16 September 1940
Location	Egypt 26°N 30°E
Result	Italian victory
Territorial changes	10th Army advanced to the Egyptian port of Sidi Barrani

Belligerents
Italy	United Kingdom; Free France

Commanders and leaders
Rodolfo Graziani; Mario Berti; Annibale Bergonzoli; Pietro Maletti	Archibald Wavell; Henry Wilson; Richard O'Connor; William Gott; John Campbell

Strength
4 divisions; 300 aircraft	1 reinforced brigade; 205 aircraft; naval support

Casualties and losses
120 killed; 410 wounded; 6 aircraft	40 killed; 10 tanks; 11 armoured cars; 4 lorries

The Italian invasion of Egypt (Operazione E) was an offensive in the Second World War from Italian Libya, against British, Commonwealth and Free French in the neutral Kingdom of Egypt. The invasion by the Italian 10th Army (10ª Armata) ended border skirmishing on the frontier and began the Western Desert Campaign (1940–1943) proper. The Italian strategy was to advance from Libya along the Egyptian coast to seize the Suez Canal. After numerous delays, the scope of the offensive was reduced to an advance as far as Sidi Barrani and the defeat of any British forces in the area.

The 10th Army advanced about 65 mi (105 km) into Egypt against British screening forces of the 7th Support Group (7th Armoured Division) the main force remaining in the vicinity of Mersa Matruh, the principal British base in the Western Desert. On 16 September 1940, the 10th Army halted and took up defensive positions around the port of Sidi Barrani. British casualties were 40 men killed and the Italians suffered 120. The army was to wait in fortified camps, until engineers had built the Via della Vittoria (Victory Road) along the coast, an extension of the Libyan Via Balbia. The Italians began to accumulate supplies for an advance against the 7th Armoured Division and the 4th Indian Division at Mersa Matruh, about 80 mi (130 km) further on.

On 8 December, before the 10th Army was ready to resume its advance on Mersa Matruh, the Western Desert Force (WDF) began Operation Compass, a five-day raid against the fortified Italian camps outside Sidi Barrani. The raid succeeded and the few units of the 10th Army in Egypt that were not destroyed were forced into a hurried retreat. The WDF pursued the remnants of the 10th Army along the coast to Sollum and across the border to Bardia, Tobruk, Derna, Mechili, Beda Fomm and El Agheila on the Gulf of Sirte. The WDF suffered casualties of 1,900 men killed and wounded during Compass and took 133,298 Italian and Libyan prisoners, 420 tanks, over 845 guns and many aircraft.

== Background ==
=== Libya ===
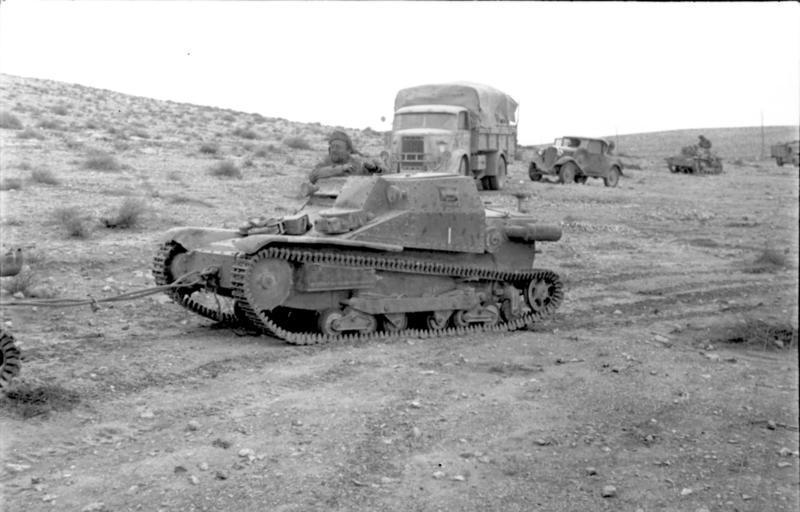
Italian L3/33 tankettes

Cyrenaica, the eastern province of Libya, had been an Italian colony since the Italo-Turkish War (1911–1912), although resistance continued until 1932. With Tunisia, a part of French North Africa to the west and Egypt to the east, the Italians had to defend both frontiers and established a North Africa Supreme Headquarters, under the command of the Governor-General of Italian Libya, Marshal of the Air Force Italo Balbo. Supreme Headquarters had the 5th Army (General Italo Gariboldi) in the west and the 10th Army (Lieutenant-General Mario Berti) in the east, which in mid-1940 had nine metropolitan divisions with an establishment of about 13,000 men each, three (Blackshirt) divisions and two Libyan colonial divisions, with an establishment of 8,000 men each. Reservists had been recalled in 1939, along with the usual call-up of new conscripts.

=== Egypt ===
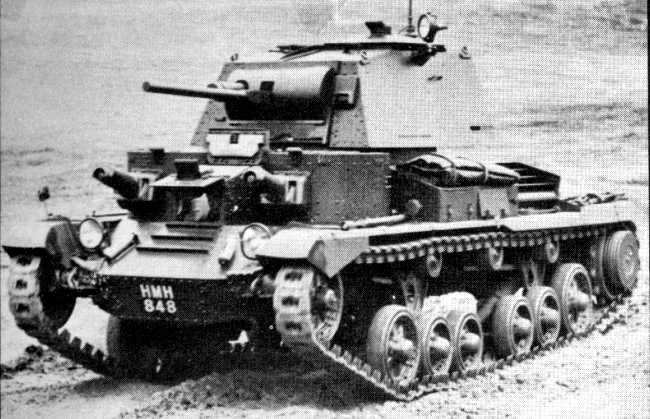
Cruiser Tank Mk I (A9)

The British had based military forces in Egypt since 1882 but these were greatly reduced by the terms of the Anglo-Egyptian Treaty of 1936. The small British and Commonwealth force garrisoned the Suez Canal and the Red Sea route, which was vital to British communications with its Far Eastern and Indian Ocean territories. Egypt was neutral during the war. In mid-1939, Lieutenant-General Archibald Wavell was appointed General Officer Commanding-in-Chief (GOC-in-C) of the new Middle East Command, over the Mediterranean and Middle East theatres. Until the Armistice of 22 June 1940, French divisions in Tunisia faced the Italians on the western Libyan border forcing the garrison to divide and face both ways.

In Libya, the Royal Italian Army had about 215,000 men and in Egypt the British had about 36,000 troops, with another 27,500 men training in Palestine. British forces included the Mobile Division (Egypt) Major-General Percy Hobart, one of two British armoured training formations, which in mid-1939 was renamed the Armoured Division (Egypt) and on 16 February 1940, the 7th Armoured Division. The Egyptian–Libyan border was defended by the Egyptian Frontier Force and in June 1940, the headquarters of the 6th Infantry Division (Major-General Richard O'Connor) took over command in the Western Desert, with instructions to drive back the Italians from their frontier posts and dominate the hinterland, if war began. The 7th Armoured Division, less the 7th Armoured Brigade, assembled at Mersa Matruh and sent the 7th Support Group forward towards the frontier as a covering force.

The RAF also moved most of its bombers closer to the frontier and Malta was reinforced to threaten the Italian supply route to Libya. The HQ of the 6th Infantry Division, still lacking complete and fully trained units, was renamed the Western Desert Force (WDF) on 17 June. In Tunisia, the French had eight divisions, capable only of limited operations and in Syria had three poorly armed and trained divisions, with about 40,000 troops and border guards, on occupation duties against the civilian population. Italian land and air forces in Libya greatly outnumbered the British in Egypt but suffered from poor morale and were handicapped by some inferior equipment. In Italian East Africa were another 130,000 Italian and East African troops with 400 guns, 200 light tanks and 20,000 lorries. On 10 June 1940 Italy declared war on France and Britain from 11 June. Canada declared war on Italy on 10 June and on 11 June, Australia, New Zealand and South Africa followed suit.

=== Terrain ===
The winds of the Mediterranean

The Western Desert is about 240 mi (390 km) long, from Mersa Matruh in Egypt, west to Gazala on the Libyan coast, along the Via Balbia, the only paved road. The Sand Sea, 150 mi (240 km) inland, marks the southern limit of the desert at its widest at Giarabub and Siwa; in British parlance, Western Desert came to include eastern Cyrenaica in Libya. From the coast, extending into the hinterland lies a raised, flat plain of stony desert about 500 ft (150 m) above sea level, that runs 120–190 mi (200–300 km) in depth until the Sand Sea. The region is inhabited by a small number of Bedouin nomads and local wildlife consists of scorpions, vipers and flies.

Bedouin tracks link wells (birs) and the easier traversed ground; desert navigation is by sun, star, compass and "desert sense", good perception of the environment gained by experience. (When the Italian invasion of Egypt began in September 1940, the Maletti Group, [Raggruppamento Maletti, Major-General Pietro Maletti], lacking experience of desert conditions, got lost leaving Sidi Omar, disappeared and had to be found by reconnaissance aircraft.) In spring and summer, days are miserably hot and nights very cold. The Sirocco (Gibleh or Ghibli), a hot desert wind, blows clouds of fine sand, reducing visibility to a few yards and coating eyes, lungs, machinery, food and equipment. Motor vehicles and aircraft need special oil and air filters and the barren ground means that water and food as well as military stores, have to be transported from outside.

=== Italian Army ===
In 1936, General Alberto Pariani had been appointed Chief of Staff of the Italian Army. Pariani began a reorganisation of the army to fight wars of rapid decision, according to thinking that speed, mobility and new technology could revolutionise military operations. In 1937, traditional three-regiment tertiary divisions began to change to two-regiment binary divisions, as part of a ten-year plan to reorganise the standing army into 24 binary, 24 triangular, twelve mountain, three motorised and three armoured divisions. The effect of the change was to increase the administrative overhead of the army with no corresponding increase in effectiveness; new technology such as tanks, motor vehicles and wireless communications were slow to arrive and were inferior to those of potential enemies. The dilution of the officer class to find extra unit staffs was made worse by the politicisation of the army and the addition of Blackshirt Militia. The reforms also promoted the tactics of frontal assault to the exclusion of other theories of war, dropping the emphasis on fast, mobile warfare backed by artillery. By September 1939, sixteen divisions of the 67 in the Italian Army (excluding the garrison of Ethiopia) had been converted to binary divisions and had received their establishment of arms and equipment. The remaining divisions had obsolete equipment, no stock of replacements and lacked artillery, tanks, anti-tank guns, anti-aircraft guns and transport.

Morale was considered to be high and the army had recent experience of military operations. The Italian navy had prospered under the Fascist regime, which had paid for fast, well-built and well-armed ships and a large submarine fleet but the navy lacked experience and training. The air force had been ready for war in 1936 but had stagnated and was not considered by the British to be capable of maintaining a high rate of operations. The 5th Army (5ª Armata) in Tripolitania, the western half of Libya opposite Tunisia, had eight divisions; the 10th Army with six infantry divisions garrisoned the province Cyrenaica in the east. At the end of June, after the Fall of France, four divisions were transferred from the 5th Army to the 10th Army. When Italy declared war on 10 June, the 10th Army comprised the 1st Libyan Division on the frontier from Giarabub to Sidi Omar and XXI Corpo d'Armata (XXI Corps, Lieutenant-General Lorenzo Dalmazzo) from Sidi Omar to the coast, Bardia and Tobruk. XX Corpo d'Armata (XX Corps, Lieutenant-General (Tenente Generale) was moved south-west of Tobruk, as a counter-attack force.

Before the war, Balbo expressed his doubts to Mussolini

It is not the number of men which causes me anxiety but their weapons ... equipped with limited and very old pieces of artillery, almost lacking anti-tank and anti-aircraft weapons ... it is useless to send more thousands of men if we cannot supply them with the indispensable requirements to move and fight.

and demanding more equipment including 1,000 trucks, 100 water tankers, more medium tanks and anti-tank guns, which the Italian economy could not produce or the army transfer from elsewhere. In Rome, Badoglio, the chief-of-staff, fobbed him off with promises, "When you have the seventy medium tanks you will dominate the situation", as Balbo prepared to invade Egypt on 15 July. After Balbo was killed in an accident, Benito Mussolini replaced him with Marshal Rodolfo Graziani, with orders to attack Egypt by 8 August. Graziani replied that the 10th Army was not properly equipped and that an attack could not possibly succeed; Mussolini ordered him to attack anyway.

== Prelude ==
=== 10th Army ===
The ten divisions of the 10th Army (Lieutenant-General Mario Berti) comprised the XX Corpo d'Armata (XX Corps), XXI Corpo d'Armata (XXI Corps), XXII Corpo d'Armata (XXII Corps, Lieutenant-General) Enrico Mannella), XXIII Corpo d'Armata (XXIII Corps, Lieutenant-General Annibale Bergonzoli). The army comprised metropolitan infantry divisions, Blackshirt (Camicie Nere [CC.NN.]) infantry divisions and Libyan colonial divisions. XXIII Corps, with the metropolitan divisions "Cirene" and "Marmarica", the Blackshirt Division "23rd Marzo", the 1st and 2nd Libyan divisions (Lieutenant-General Sebastiano Gallina) and the Maletti Group was to conduct the invasion. Bergonzoli had about 1,000 lorries, first to move the "Cirene" and "Marmarica" divisions, followed by the "23rd Marzo". The Libyan divisions had 650 vehicles, enough to move equipment, weapons and supplies but the infantry would have to walk; the Maletti Group had 450 vehicles, enough to move its troops. The Maletti Group comprised three battalions of Libyan infantry, additional artillery, much of the Italian armoured vehicle element in Libya and almost all of the M11/39 medium tanks. XXI Corps, with the Sirte and "28th Ottobre" divisions formed a reserve and XXII Corps with the "Catanzaro" and "3rd Gennaio" divisions were left at Tobruk because of the transport shortage.

=== Squadra 5 ===
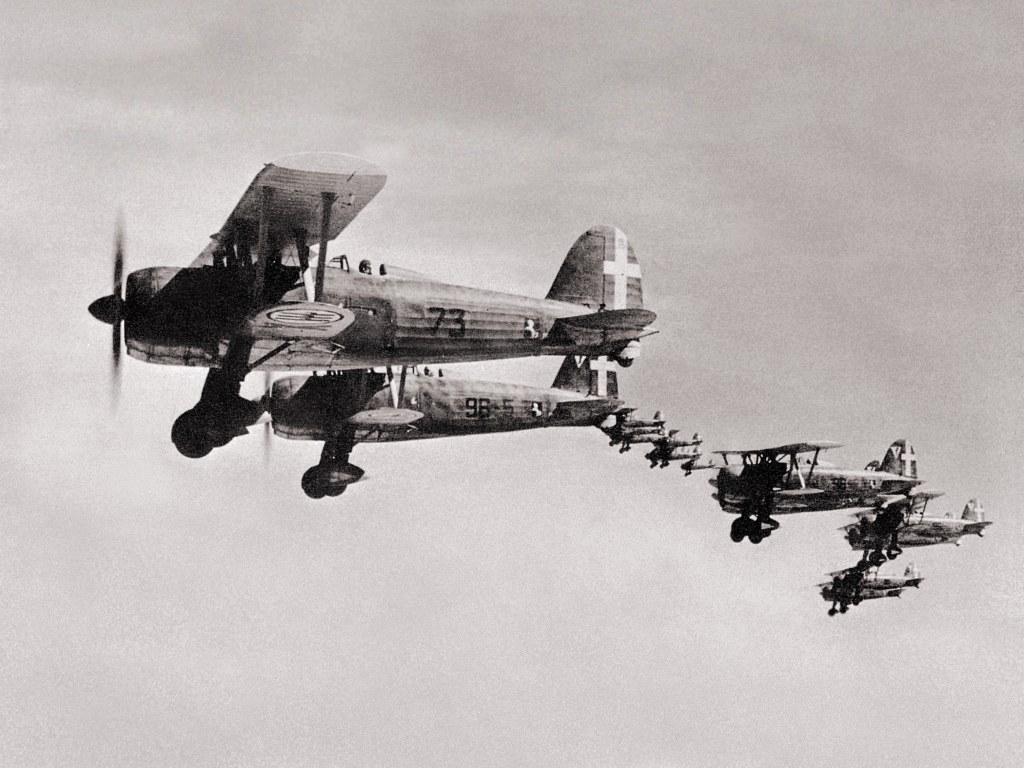
Fiat CR.42s of the 73° and 97° Squadriglia, 9° Gruppo, 4° Stormo over Benina in Libya, 1940

Operational commands of the Regia Aeronautica (Royal Italian Air Force) were called Zona Aerea Territoriale, Squadra or the Comando of an area. The 10th Army was supported by Squadra 5, with 336 aircraft. Squadra 5 had four bomber wings, a fighter wing, three fighter groups, two reconnaissance groups and two squadrons of colonial reconnaissance aircraft, comprising 110 Savoia-Marchetti SM.79 bombers, fifty Breda Ba.65 ground attack aircraft, 170 Fiat CR.42 fighters and six IMAM Ro.37, Caproni Ca.309 and Caproni Ca.310bis long-range reconnaissance aircraft. On 9 September, another sixty-four bombers, seventy-five ground-attack aircraft and fifteen reconnaissance aircraft arrived from Italy. (Note: Sources give conflicting data, Santoro listed 110 bombers, 135 fighters, 45 ground-attack aircraft, six long-range reconnaissance aircraft and four torpedo-bombers.) Squadra 5 was organised to follow and support the army in the field as a self-contained unit.

=== Regia Marina ===
Berti could expect little support from the Royal Italian Navy (Regia Marina) because ten submarines had been lost since Italy declared war, the fleet was too important to risk and was short of fuel.

=== Italian plans ===
Three times, deadlines were set for an Italian invasion and cancelled; the first plan was intended to coincide with an expected German invasion of England on 15 July 1940. Balbo took all the trucks from the 5th Army and the M11/39 medium tanks being delivered from Italy, to reinforce the 10th Army for a crossing of the frontier wire and an occupation of Sollum as soon as war was declared. After a British counter-attack was repulsed and the Italian armies were replenished, the advance would continue. Although this plan was based on a realistic appreciation of what the Italian armies in Libya could achieve, it fell through when the invasion of England was cancelled. (Note: The Italians considered forming a mechanised force to invade Egypt, followed by garrison troops to maintain the lines of communication. Two divisions and a brigade of Libyan troops could be fully motorised and join the tanks and motorised artillery, which would have created an all-arms force. Graziani rejected the suggestion since the rest of the army would lose its supply transport. The Tank Command Libya (Comando carri della Libia) three or four artillery regiments and a motorised infantry division could have been formed according to the new mechanised warfare theory but Graziani favoured strength in numbers.) The second plan, for 22 August, was for a limited advance to Sollum and Shawni el Aujerin to the east, with three columns moving on three lines of advance. Once Sollum had been occupied, an advance on Sidi Barrani would be considered, an example of advance-in-mass, used on the northern front in the Ethiopian War. The Italian un-motorised infantry divisions were to use the only road but the summer heat in August, which would have affected them most, led to another postponement.

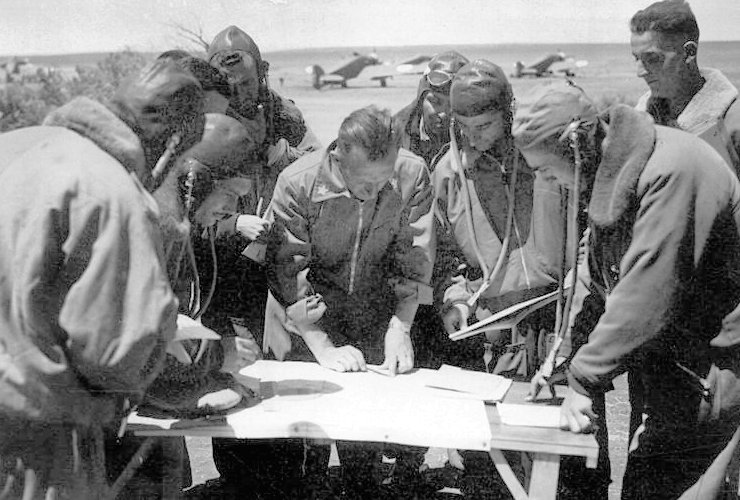
Italian pilots of the Royal Italian Air Force in Egypt study a map (September 1940).

The third plan was for an invasion on 9 September with Sidi Barrani as the objective, which Graziani disclosed to his staff six days before Mussolini ordered the invasion. The non-motorised, metropolitan divisions would advance along the coast and attack through Halfaya Pass, occupy Sollum and continue to Sidi Barrani. A southern column of the Libyan divisions and the Maletti Group was to advance along the Dayr al Hamra–Bir ar Rabiyah–Bir Enba track, to outflank the British on the escarpment. The Maletti Group was to drive south and east through the desert but the Italian staff failed to provide proper maps and navigation equipment; when moving to its assembly and jumping-off points, the group got lost and XXIII Corps Headquarters had to send aircraft to help lead the group into position; the Libyan divisions arriving late at the rendezvous near Fort Capuzzo.

The embarrassment of the Maletti Group added to doubts about the lack of lorries, transport aircraft and British domination of the terrain, which led to another change of plan. The fourth plan was set for 13 September, with Sidi Barrani and the area to the south as the objective. The 10th Army, with only five divisions, due to the shortage of transport and the tanks of the Maletti Group, would advance in mass down the coast road, occupy Sollum and advance through Buq Buq to Sidi Barrani. The 10th Army was to consolidate at Sidi Barrani and bring up supplies, destroy a British counter-attack and resume the advance to Matruh. The non-motorised infantry divisions were to use the coast road because they would be ineffective anywhere else. A similar operation had been conducted on the northern front in Ethiopia but went against mobile warfare theory, for which there were ample forces to execute. Graziani believed the only way to defeat the British was by mass, having overestimated their strength.

=== Western Desert Force ===
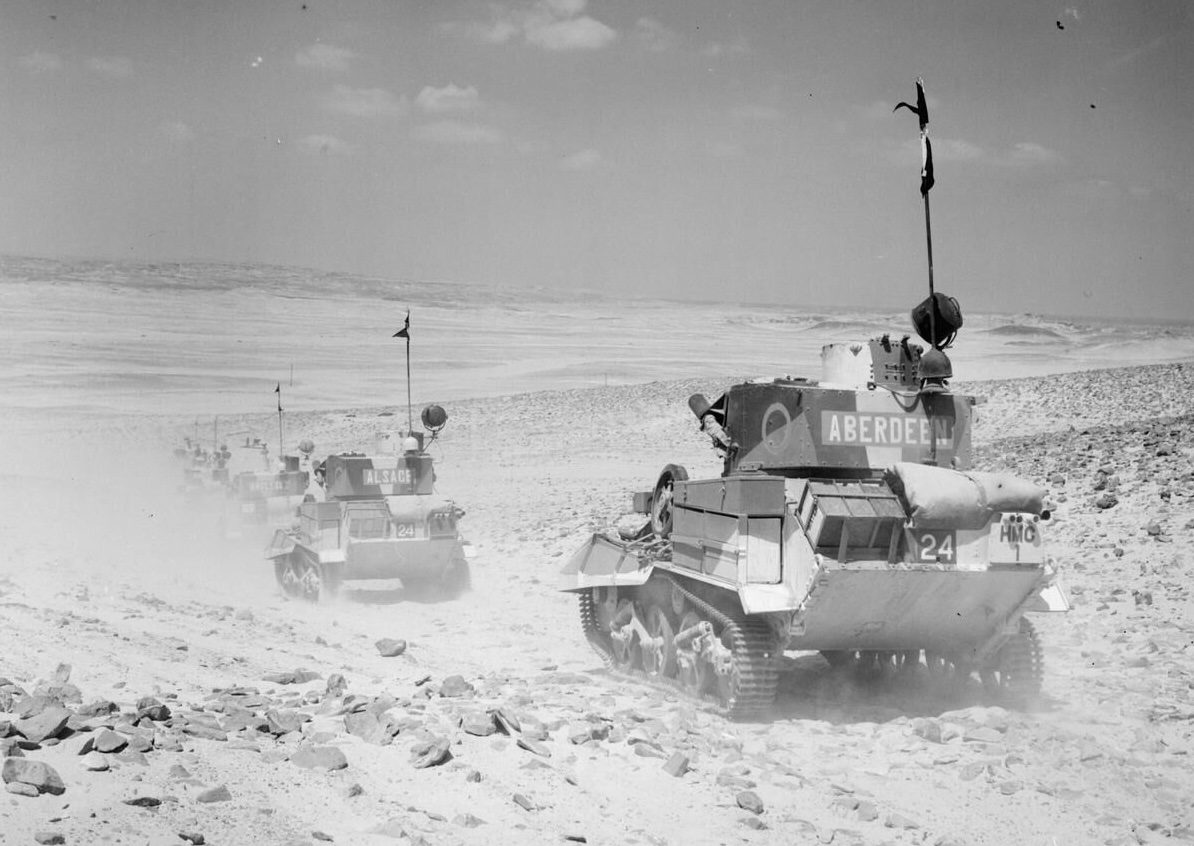
British Light Tanks MK VIB of the 7th Armoured Division on patrol in the desert, 2 August 1940.

Against an estimated 250,000 Italian troops based in Libya and about 250,000 more in Italian East Africa, Wavell had a ration strength of about 36,000 troops in Egypt; fourteen non-brigaded battalions of British infantry; the 2nd New Zealand Division (Major-General Bernard Freyberg) with one infantry brigade, an understrength cavalry regiment, a machine gun battalion and a field artillery regiment. The 4th Indian Infantry Division (Major-General Noel Beresford-Peirse) had two infantry brigades and some artillery, the 7th Armoured Division (Major-General Sir Michael Creagh) had two armoured brigades with two armoured regiments each instead of three. The 7th Support Group, with three motorised infantry battalions, artillery, engineers and machine-gunners, was to harass the Italians and to fight delaying actions between the border and Matruh if attacked but to retain the capacity to engage the main Italian force.

2nd Cameron Highlanders training at Mena Camp near Giza, Egypt, 4 June 1940

At Matruh an infantry force would await the Italian attack, while from the escarpment on the desert flank the bulk of the 7th Armoured Division, would be ready to counter-attack. The covering force was to exaggerate its size and the 7th Support Group was to use its mobility to cover the desert flank, while along the coast road, the 3rd Coldstream Guards, a company of the 1st Battalion King's Royal Rifle Corps (KRRC) and a company of Free French Motor Marines, with supporting artillery and machine-gunners, would fall back in stages, demolishing the road as they retired. At the end of May 1940, the Royal Air Force in the Middle East had 205 aircraft, including 96 obsolete Bombay medium bombers and modern Blenheim light bombers, 75 obsolete Gladiator fighters and 34 other types. In July, four Hawker Hurricane fighters arrived but only one could be spared for the WDF. By the end of July, the Mediterranean Fleet controlled the Eastern Mediterranean and were able to bombard Italian coastal positions and transport supplies along the coast to Matruh and beyond.

=== Border skirmishes ===
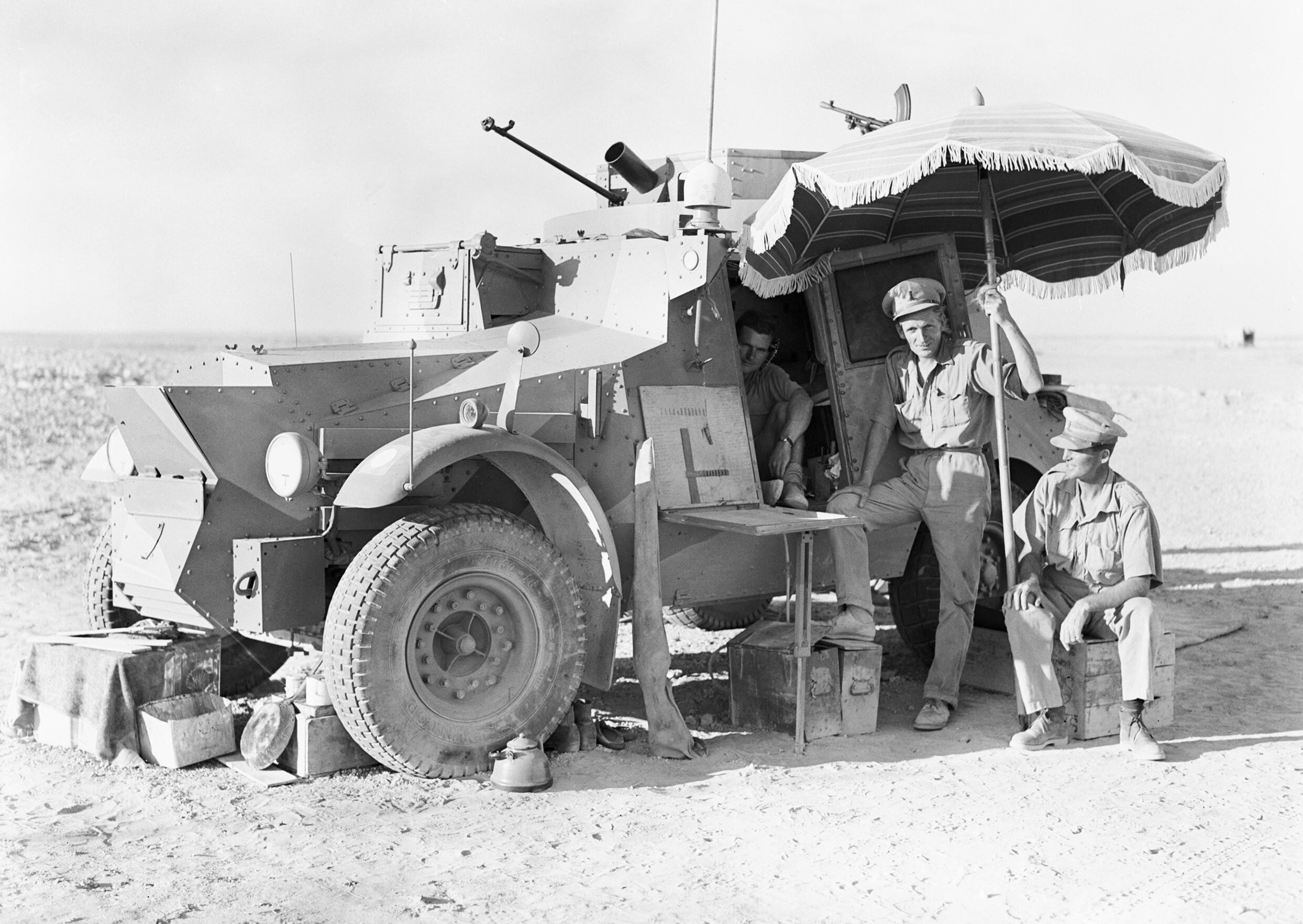
Officers of the 11th Hussars using a parasol to give shade during a halt, while out patrolling on the Libyan frontier, 26 July 1940. The vehicle is a Morris CS9 armoured car.

On 17 June, using the headquarters of the British 6th Infantry Division, the headquarters of the WDF (Lieutenant-General O'Connor) was formed to control all troops facing the Italians in Cyrenaica, a force of about 10,000 men, with aircraft, tanks and guns. O'Connor was to organise aggressive patrolling along the frontier and set out to dominate no-man's land by creating "jock columns", mobile combined-arms formations based on units of 7th Armoured Division. These small, well-trained, regular forces made the first attacks on Italian convoys and fortified positions across the border. British patrols closed up to the frontier wire on 11 June, with orders to dominate the area, harass the garrisons of the frontier forts and lay ambushes along the Via Balbia and inland tracks.

Some Italian troops were unaware that war had been declared and seventy were captured on the track to Sidi Omar. Patrols ranged north to the coast road between Bardia and Tobruk, west to Bir el Gubi and south to Giarabub. Within a week, the 11th Hussars (Prince Albert's Own) had seized Fort Capuzzo and at an ambush east of Bardia, captured the 10th Army Engineer-in-Chief, Brigadier-General Romolo Lastrucci. Italian reinforcements arrived at the frontier, began to conduct reconnaissance patrols, improved the frontier defences and recaptured Fort Capuzzo. On 13 August, the British raids were stopped to conserve the serviceability of vehicles; the 7th Support Group took over to observe the wire for 60 mi (97 km) from Sollum to Fort Maddalena, ready to fight delaying actions if the Italians invaded Egypt.

== Operazione E ==
=== 9–10 September ===
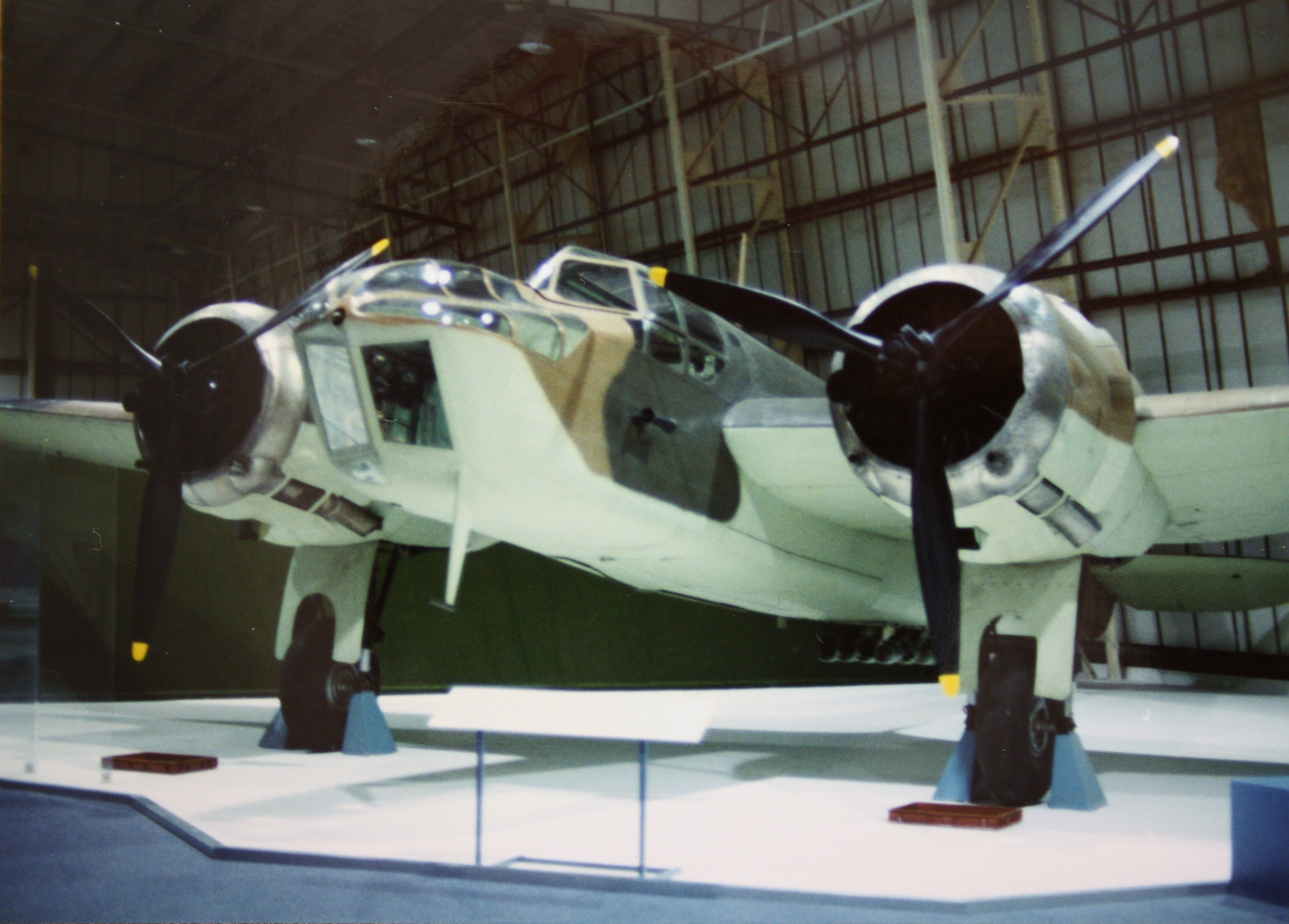
Restored example of a Bristol Blenheim (9817839176)

The XXIII Corpo d'Armata (XXIII Corps) was to lead the 10th Army attack to Sidi Barrani in Egypt along the coast road with non-motorised and motorised formations. The corps had been given more lorries; the 62nd Infantry Division "Marmarica" and 63rd Infantry Division "Cirene" were part-motorised, the 1st CC.NN. Division "23 Marzo" was motorised, as were the Maletti Group and the 1st Tank Group (1° Raggruppamento Carri). The part-motorised infantry divisions would move by shuttling forward and the non-motorized infantry would have to march the 60 mi (97 km) to Sidi Barrani. Bergonzoli wanted the 1st Tank Group as an advanced guard, two motorised infantry divisions in line and one motorised division in reserve. The two Libyan non-motorised infantry divisions would have to move on foot, with the Maletti Group bringing up the rear.

The 1st Tank Group was held back in reserve, except for the LXIII Tank Battalion "L" attached to the 63rd Infantry Division "Cirene" and the LXII Tank Battalion "L", which was attached to the 62nd Infantry Division "Marmarica". The 2nd Tank Group stayed at Bardia except for the IX Tank Battalion "L" attached to the 2nd Libyan Division. The II Tank Battalion "M" was with the Maletti Group, which had three fully-motorised Libyan infantry battalions. On 9 September, the activity of the Royal Italian Air Force increased and bombers from 55 Squadron, 113 Squadron and 211 Squadron RAF retaliated with attacks on Italian airfields, transport, supply dumps and a raid on Tobruk by 21 aircraft.

Later in the day, 27 Italian fighters made a sweep over Buq Buq and the RAF flew more sorties against Italian airfields. British air reconnaissance revealed much ground movement at Bardia, Sidi Azeiz, Gabr Saleh and in the direction of Sidi Omar, on the frontier wire, from the west, which was interpreted as the beginning of the Italian invasion. The forward move of the 10th Army showed the limits of Italian mobility and navigation, when the Maletti Group got lost moving up to Sidi Omar. On 10 September, the armoured cars of the 11th Hussars spotted the Maletti Group and a thick mist shielded the British as they shadowed the slow Italian assembly. As the mist cleared, the hussars were attacked by Italian aircraft, tanks and artillery.

=== 13–14 September ===
The Italian invasion of Egypt, 1940

On 13 September, the 1st CC.NN. Division "23 Marzo", re-took Fort Capuzzo and a bombardment fell on Musaid, just over the Egyptian side of the border, which was then occupied. Artillery-fire and bombing began on Sollum airfield and barracks (which were empty), which raised a dust cloud. When the dust cleared the Italian army could be seen drawn up, ready to advance against the British covering force of the 3rd Coldstream Guards, some field artillery, an extra infantry battalion and a machine-gun company. The Italians advanced along the coast with two divisions leading, behind a screen of motorcyclists, tanks, motorised infantry and artillery. The Italian formation made an easy target for artillery and aircraft but the 1st Libyan Division soon occupied Sollum barracks and began to move down the escarpment to the port.

On the inland plateau, an Italian advance towards Halfaya Pass was opposed by a covering force of a 3rd Coldstream company, a Northumberland Fusilier platoon and some artillery, which began to withdraw in the afternoon, as more Italian infantry and tanks arrived. During the evening, two columns of the 2nd Libyan Division, the 63rd Infantry Division "Cirene" and the Maletti Group from Musaid and the 62nd Infantry Division "Marmarica" from Sidi Omar, converged on the pass. Next day, the Italian units on the escarpment began to descend through the pass, towards the Italian force advancing along the road from Sollum. A squadron of the 11th Hussars, the 2nd Rifle Brigade and cruiser tanks of the 1st Royal Tank Regiment (1st RTR) harassed the Italian force on the escarpment. Just after noon, the British troops on the coast retreated to Buq Buq and met reinforcements from the 11th Hussars and a motorised company of Troupes de marine (French marines), which was enough to maintain contact with the Italians. The British withdrew to Alam Hamid on 15 September and Alam el Dab on 16 September, trying to inflict maximum losses without being pinned down and destroying the coast road as they went, damage which was made worse by the amount of Italian traffic.

=== 16 September ===
The uncommitted part of the 1st Tank Group followed the Libyan divisions towards Bir Thidan el Khadim. At Alam el Dab near Sidi Barrani, about fifty Italian tanks, motorised infantry and artillery tried an outflanking move, that forced the Coldstream Guards to retreat. The armoured group was engaged by British field artillery and made no further move. By nightfall, the 1st CC.NN. Division "23 Marzo", had occupied Sidi Barrani. Above the escarpment, the British covering forces fell back parallel to those on the coast road and no attack from the flank occurred. British aircraft flew many reconnaissance and bombing sorties and Squadra 5 made sweeps with up to 100 fighters and bombers on British forward airfields and defensive positions.

The British anticipated that the Italian advance would stop at Sidi Barrani and Sofafi and began to observe the positions with the 11th Hussars, as the 7th Support Group withdrew to rest and the 7th Armoured Division prepared to confront an advance on Matruh. Italian radio broadcasts about the invasion suggested that the advance would continue from Sidi Barrani but it soon appeared that the Italians were digging-in on an arc to the south and south-west at Maktila, Tummar (east), Tummar (west), Nibeiwa and on top of the escarpment at Sofafi as divisions further back occupied Buq Buq, Sidi Omar and Halfaya Pass.

== Aftermath ==
=== Analysis ===
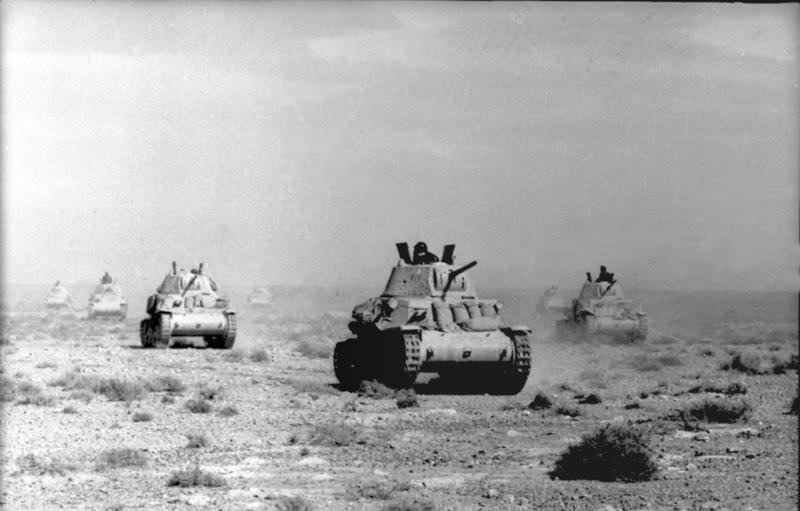
New Fiat M13/40 tanks began to arrive in October 1940

The 10th Army advanced about 12 mi (19 km) a day to enable the non-motorised units to keep up and at Sidi Barrani, built fortified camps. No bold mechanised strokes or flanking movements had been made by the armoured units, XXIII Corpo d'Armata had guarded the infantry instead and the 10th Army suffered fewer than 550 casualties during the advance. The Maletti Group, the 1st Tank Group and the 1st CC.NN. Division "23rd Marzo", had failed to operate according to Italian armoured warfare theory. Lack of preparation, training and organisation had led to blunders in assembling and directing the Maletti Group and over-caution with the other tank battalions of 1st Tank Group. The rush to motorise the 1st CC.NN. Division "23rd Marzo" and its lack of training as a motorised division, disorganised the relationship between drivers and infantry.

The advance reached Sidi Barrani with modest losses but failed to do much damage to the British. On 21 September, there were sixty-eight Fiat M.11/39 tanks left of the seventy-two sent to Libya. The 1st Medium Tank Battalion had nine serviceable and twenty-three unserviceable tanks and the 2nd Medium Tank Battalion had twenty-eight operational and eight non-operational tanks. Italian medium tank strength was expected to increase when deliveries of the new Fiat M13/40, which had a powerful Cannone da 47/32 M35 47 mm gun, began. The III Medium Tank Battalion, with thirty-seven M13/40 tanks, arrived in Libya on 12 October, followed by the V Medium Tank Battalion with thirty-seven M13/40 tanks on 12 December. In mid-November the Italians had 417 medium and light tanks in Libya and Egypt. Wavell wrote,

The greatest possible credit is due to Brigadier William Gott, MC, commanding the Support Group, and to Lieutenant-Colonel John Campbell, MC, commanding the Artillery, for the cool and efficient way in which this withdrawal was carried out, also to the troops for their endurance and tactical skill.

Repair works began on the coast road, renamed Via della Vittoria from Bardia and construction of a water pipe was begun, though they were not expected to be ready before mid-December, after which the advance would be resumed as far as Matruh.

Mussolini wrote on 26 October

Forty days after the capture of Sidi Barrani I ask myself the question, to whom has this long halt been any use—to us or to the enemy? I do not hesitate to answer, it has been of much use, indeed, more to the enemy.... It is time to ask whether you feel you wish to continue to command.

Two days later, on 28 October, the Italians invaded Greece, beginning the Greco-Italian War. Graziani was allowed to continue planning at a leisurely pace and an Italian advance to Matruh was scheduled for mid-December.

=== Casualties ===
In 1971, Kenneth Macksey wrote that the 10th Army suffered 530 casualties, 120 killed and 410 wounded against a British loss of "but forty men...and little equipment". In 1993, Harold Raugh wrote of about 2,000 Italian casualties against less than fifty British. In 1995, the writers of the informal German official history, Germany and the Second World War, noted that equipment losses for both sides had not been accurately tabulated. In 1997, Giorgio Bocca wrote that the WDF suffered casualties of forty men killed, ten tanks, eleven armoured cars and four lorries destroyed. In his 1999 MA thesis, Howard Christie wrote that from 9 to 16 September, the 10th Army suffered casualties of 120 men killed and 410 wounded. Several tanks and lorries broke down and six aircraft were lost, two to accidents.

=== Subsequent operations ===
On 17 September, the Mediterranean Fleet began to harass Italian communications and Benghazi harbour was mined. A destroyer and two merchant ships were sunk by torpedo and a destroyer hit a mine at Benghazi and sank. RAF Blenheims destroyed three aircraft on the ground at Benina. The road on the escarpment near Sollum was bombarded by a navy gunboat and targets near Sidi Barrani by two destroyers; fires and explosions were seen. Captured Italians spoke of damage, casualties and a loss of morale. An attempt to bombard Bardia by the cruiser HMS Kent and two destroyers was thwarted by Italian torpedo bombers, which put Kent out of action with a hit on the stern. Bombardments continued during the lull, which led to camps and depots being moved inland. Small British columns on land were set up to work with armoured car patrols, moving close to the Italian camps, gleaning information and dominating their himterland.

==== Operation Compass ====
On 8 December the British began Operation Compass, a five-day raid against the fortified Italian camps set up in a defensive line outside Sidi Barrani. Berti was on sick leave and Gariboldi had temporarily taken his place. The raid succeeded and the few units of the 10th Army in Egypt that were not destroyed were forced to withdraw. By 11 December, the British began a counter-offensive and the rest of the 10th Army was swiftly defeated. The British pursued the remnants of the 10th Army to Sollum, Bardia, Tobruk, Derna, Mechili, Beda Fomm and El Agheila on the Gulf of Sirte. The British lost 1,900 men killed and wounded, about ten per cent of their infantry, in capturing 133,298 Italian and Libyan prisoners, 420 tanks and over 845 guns and aircraft. The British were unable to continue beyond El Agheila, due to broken-down and worn out vehicles and the diversion of the best-equipped units to the Greek Campaign.

== Orders of Battle 10 June 1940 ==
=== 5th Army ===
Air Marshal Italo Balbo, Supreme Commander Italian Forces in North Africa. Details taken from Christie (1999) unless specified.

- 5th Army (Western Sector Tripolitania, General Italo Gariboldi)
  - X Corps (Generale di Corpo d'armata [Lieutenant-General] Alberto Barbieri from 10 June)
    - 25th Infantry Division "Bologna"
    - 55th Infantry Division "Savona"
    - 60th Infantry Division "Sabratha"
  - XX Corps (Generale di Corpo d'armata Ferdinando Cona)
    - 17th Infantry Division "Pavia"
    - 27th Infantry Division "Brescia"
    - 61st Infantry Division "Sirte"
  - XXIII Corps (Generale di Corpo d'armata Annibale Bergonzoli)
    - 1st CC.NN. Division "23 Marzo"
    - 2nd CC.NN. Division "28 Ottobre"
  - 2nd Libyan Division (5th Army reserve)

=== 10th Army ===
- 10th Army (Eastern Sector, Cyrenaica, General Mario Berti [on leave in Italy, Gariboldi deputising])
  - XXI Corps (Generale di Corpo d'armata Lorenzo Dalmazzo)
    - 62nd Infantry Division "Marmarica"
    - 63rd Infantry Division "Cirene"
  - XXII Corps (Generale di Corpo d'armata Enrico Mannella)
    - 64th Infantry Division "Catanzaro"
    - 4th CC.NN. Division "3 Gennaio"
  - 1st Libyan Division (10th Army reserve)

==== Squadra 5 (June 1940) ====
On 10 June 1940 there were 363 Italian aircraft in North Africa of which 306 were operational, 179 were unserviceable and 57 were trainers. (Note: Squadra 5 was the air force command responsible for Libya, with its HQ in Tripoli in western Libya, having superseded Aeronautica della Libia on 15 July 1940. Settore Ovest (west) was based at Tripoli and Settore Est (east) at Tobruk to simplify the administration of the Squadra over such great distances.)

- Bomber
  - 10th Stormo (Wing): 30 Savoia-Marchetti SM.79
  - 14th Stormo: 12 SM.79, 1 Fiat BR.20
  - 15th Stormo: 35 SM.79, 8 Savoia-Marchetti SM.81, 3 BR.20
  - 33rd Stormo: 31 SM.79
- Fighter
  - 2nd Stormo: 36 Fiat CR.32, 25 Fiat CR.42
  - 50th Stormo: 11 Breda Ba.65 (ground attack), 3 IMAM Ro.41 (reconnaissance), 23 Caproni Ca.310 (light bomber/reconnaissance)
  - X Gruppo: 27 Fiat CR.42
- Reconnaissance
  - LXIV Group: 8 IMAM Ro.37bis, 5 RO.1bis
  - LXXIII Group: 6 RO.37bis, 1 RO.1bis
  - 143rd Squadriglie: CANT Z.501/6 (maritime reconnaissance)
- Colonial
  - I Gruppo Aviazione Presidio Coloniale: 18 Caproni Ca.309, CA.310, RO.37 (light bomber/reconnaissance)
  - II Gruppo Aviazione Presidio Coloniale: 21 CA.309, CA.310 and RO.37 (light bomber/reconnaissance)

=== Western Desert Force ===
- Commander-in-Chief Middle East, General Sir Archibald Wavell
  - Commander WDF: Lieutenant-General R. N. O'Connor
- 7th Armoured Division (Major-General Michael Creagh)
  - 4th Armoured Brigade, Mersa Matruh
    - 1st Royal Tank Regiment
    - 6th Royal Tank Regiment
  - 7th Armoured Brigade, Sidi Suleiman
    - 7th Hussars
    - 8th Hussars
  - 7th Support Group (Motorised Infantry Brigade) Sidi Barrani
    - 1st K.R.R.C. Battalion
    - 2nd Motor Battalion (The Rifle Brigade)
    - 3rd Battalion Coldstream Guards
    - 1st Royal Northumberland Fusiliers
    - 3rd Royal Horse Artillery
    - F Battery, 4th Royal Horse Artillery
    - 11th Hussars (attached to 7th Support Group from 7th Armoured Brigade)

==== Sidi Barrani ====
Operations on the Libyan–Egyptian Border

- Cairo Infantry Brigade – Garrison for Mersa Matruh

==== Other Commonwealth Forces in Egypt ====
- 4th Indian Division (less one infantry brigade) Nile Delta
  - 5th Indian Infantry Brigade
  - 11th Indian Infantry Brigade
  - Divisional Troops
- 6th Australian Division (forming, Nile delta)
- 2nd New Zealand Division (forming, Nile delta)

== Orders of battle, September 1940 ==
=== 10th Army ===
- 10th Army Marshal Rodolfo Graziani, Supreme Commander of the Italian Forces in North Africa
  - XXI Corps (10th Army Reserve, Tobruk)
    - 61st Infantry Division "Sirte"
    - 2nd CC.NN. Division "28 Ottobre"
    - LX Tank Battalion "L" (L3/35 tankettes, from the 60th Infantry Division "Sabratha")
  - XXII Corps, Generale di Divisione (Major-General) Enrico Mannella
    - 64th Infantry Division "Catanzaro"
    - 4th CC.NN. Division "3 Gennaio"
  - XXIII Corps, Generale di Corpo d'Armata (Lieutenant-General) Annibale Bergonzoli
    - 62nd Infantry Division "Marmarica" (part-motorised for the invasion)
    - 63rd Infantry Division "Cirene" (part-motorised for the invasion)
  - Libyan Divisions Group, Generale di Divisione Giuseppe Gallina
    - 1st Libyan Division (non-motorised)
    - 2nd Libyan Division (non-motorised)
  - 1st CC.NN. Division "23 Marzo" (Reserve, motorised for the invasion of Egypt)
- Libyan Tank Command Comando Carri Armati della Libia, Generale di Divisione (Major-General) Valentino Babini
  - 1st Tank Group
    - I Tank Battalion "M" / 4th Tank Infantry Regiment (M11/39 tanks, reserve to XXIII Corps)
    - XXI Tank Battalion "L" (L3/35 tankettes, from XXI Corps)
    - LXII Tank Battalion "L" (L3/35 tankettes, from the 62nd Infantry Division "Marmarica")
    - LXIII Tank Battalion "L" (L3/35 tankettes, from the 63rd Infantry Division "Cirene")
  - 2nd Tank Group
    - II Tank Battalion "M" / 4th Tank Infantry Regiment (M11/39 tanks)
    - IX Tank Battalion "L" (L3/35 tankettes, from the 2nd Libyan Division)
    - XX Tank Battalion "L" (L3/33 and L3/35 tankettes, from XX Corps)
    - LXI Tank Battalion "L" (L3/33 and L3/35 tankettes, from the 61st Infantry Division "Sirte")
  - Maletti Group (attached XXIII Corps)
    - Mixed Tank Battalion (1 × Company from the II Tank Battalion "M" and 1 × Company from the LX Tank Battalion "L")
    - I Libyan Infantry Battalion
    - V Libyan Infantry Battalion
    - XIX Libyan Infantry Battalion

==== Squadra 5 ====
Squadra 5, 1 September 1940
Gruppo	Squadriglie	Type	No.	Role	Base
1 Aviazione Presidio Coloniale	12, 89, 104	Ca 309	21	Reconnaissance, supply	Mellaha
7	6. 86, 98	Ba 88	32	Ground attack	Derna
8	92, 93, 94	CR 42	11	Day fighter, escort	Derna
10	84, 90, 91	CR 42	22	Day fighter, escort	Bir el Gobi
12	159, 160	Ba 65, CR 32	7, 10	Ground attack	Tobruk T2
13	77, 78, 82	CR 42	28	Day fighter	Berka
16	167, 168	CR 32, Ba 65	10, 5	Ground attack	Tobruk T2
32	57, 58	SM 79	5	Reconnaissance/anti-shipping	Derna
33	59, 60	SM 79	—	Anti-shipping	Benina
35	43, 44	SM 79	—	Day bombing	Bir el Bhera
36	45, 46	SM 79	—	Day bombing	Bir el Bhera
44	6, 7	SM 79	11	Day bombing	El Adem
46	20, 21	SM 79	—	Day bombing	Benina
47	53, 54	SM 81, SM 79	—	Day bombing	Benina
54	218, 219	SM 81	13	Night bombing	Ain el Gazala
63	41, 113	Ro 37	16	Armed reconnaissance	(Cirenaica)
64	136	Ro 37	—	Armed reconnaissance	Gambut
145	604, 610	SM 74, SM 75	3, 4	Transport	Benghazi
147	601, 602, 603	SM 75	13	Transport	Benghazi, Tobruk
148	605, 606	SM 73	7	Transport	Benghazi
151	366, 367, 368	CR 42	30	Day fighter	Derna, Ain el Gazala
Battaglione Aviazione Sahariana (Note: BAS squadrons guarded the oases in southern Libya.)	99, 26	Ca 309	6, 6	Armed reconnaissance	Hon, Kufra
67	115	Ro 37	10	Armed reconnaissance	(Libya)
73	136, 137	Ro 37, Ca 310	7, 6	Armed reconnaissance	Menastir
Autonomo (Note: Under Squadra 5 command.)	145	Z 501	6	Armed reconnaissance–maritime	Benghazi
Autonomo	175	SM 79	5	Armed reconnaissance	Gambut, T5

=== Western Desert Force ===
Commander-in-Chief, Middle East: General Sir Archibald Wavell Commander WDF: Lieutenant-General R. N. O'Connor

- Corps Troops
  - 7th Battalion, Royal Tank Regiment (Matildas)
  - 1st Royal Horse Artillery
  - 104th Royal Horse Artillery
  - 51st Field Regiment R.A.
  - 7th Medium Regiments R.A.
  - 64th Medium Regiments R.A.
- 7th Armoured Division
  - 4th Armoured Brigade
  - 7th Armoured Brigade
  - Support Group (Infantry Brigade)
  - Divisional Troops
- 4th Indian Division
  - 5th Indian Infantry Brigade
  - 11th Indian Infantry Brigade
  - Divisional Troops
  - 16th Infantry Brigade (att. 4th Indian Division until 11 December 1940)
- 6th Australian Division (from mid-December)
  - 16th Australian Infantry Brigade
  - 17th Australian Infantry Brigade
  - 16th Infantry Brigade (det. 4th Indian Division 11 December)
  - Divisional troops
  - 7th RTR (det. 7th Armoured Division)
- Selby Force (a Brigade Group for the defence of Mersa Matruh) (Note: The WDF consisted of about 31,000 soldiers, 120 guns, 275 tanks and sixty armoured cars. The Italian 10th Army inside Egypt consisted of 80,000 troops, 250 guns and 125 tanks. The 4th Indian Division was exchanged with the 6th Australian Division for the pursuit after the first part of Operation Compass.)

== See also ==
- List of Italian military equipment in World War II
- List of British military equipment of World War II
- List of World War II battles
- North African campaign timeline
