= Battle of Sidi Barrani =

1940 battle of WWII

- Part of Operation Compass, during the Second World War
- Western Desert
Date	10–11 December 1940; (1 day)
Location	Sidi Barrani, Egypt 31°36′39″N 25°55′32″E
Result	British victory

Belligerents
United Kingdom; (British Raj) British India; Australia; Free France	Italy

Commanders and leaders
Archibald Wavell; Henry Wilson; Richard O'Connor	Rodolfo Graziani; Giuseppe Tellera; Annibale Bergonzoli

Units involved
Western Desert Force	10th Army

Strength
36,000 men; 120 guns; 275 tanks; 142 aircraft	60,000 men; 250 guns; 120 tanks; 331 aircraft

Casualties and losses
624	2,194 killed; 2,286 wounded; 38,300 prisoners; 237 guns; 73 tanks; c. 1,000 vehicles
- Sidi Barrani, Egypt

The Battle of Sidi Barrani (10–11 December 1940) was the opening battle of Operation Compass, the first big British attack of the Western Desert Campaign of the Second World War. Sidi Barrani, on the Mediterranean coast in Egypt, had been occupied by the Italian 10th Army, during the Italian invasion of Egypt (9–16 September 1940) and was attacked by British, Commonwealth and imperial troops, who re-captured the port.

While retreating from Sidi Barrani and Buq Buq, the 10th Army divisions crowded on the coast road and were easy targets for HMS Terror and two gunboats, that bombarded the Sollum area all day and for most of the night of 11 December. By late on 12 December, the only Italian positions left in Egypt were at the approaches to Sollum and the vicinity of Sidi Omar.

The British took 38,300 prisoners for a loss of 624 men and continued the five-day raid on Italian positions in Egypt, eventually capturing Cyrenaica and most of the 10th Army between Sollum and at the Battle of Beda Fomm, south of the port of Benghazi.

== Background ==
=== Libya ===
Cyrenaica, the eastern province of Libya had been an Italian colony since the Italo-Turkish War (1911–1912). With Tunisia, a part of French North Africa to the west and Egypt to the east, the Italians prepared to defend both frontiers with a North Africa Supreme Headquarters, under the command of the Governor-General of Italian Libya, Marshal of the Air Force (Maresciallo dell'Aria), Italo Balbo. Supreme Headquarters had the 5th Army (General Italo Gariboldi) and the 10th Army (General Mario Berti) which in mid-1940 had nine metropolitan divisions of about 13,000 men each, three Blackshirt (Milizia Volontaria per la Sicurezza Nazionale and two Italian Libyan Colonial Divisions with 8,000 men each.

In the late 30s, Italian divisions had been cut from three regiments each to two for increased mobility once they were mechanised; reservists were recalled in 1939, along with the usual call-up of conscripts. Morale was considered to be high and the Army (Regio Esercito) had recent experience of military operations. The Royal Navy (Regia Marina) had prospered under the Fascist regime, which had paid for fast, well-built and well-armed ships and a large submarine fleet but the navy lacked experience and training. The Royal Air Force (Regia Aeronautica) had stagnated and by 1939 was not considered by the British to be capable of a high rate of operations. The 5th Army, with eight divisions, was in Tripolitania, the province adjacent to Tunisia and the 10th Army, with six divisions, held Cyrenaica in the east. When war was declared, the 10th Army moved the 1st Libyan Division to the frontier from Giarabub (Jaghbub) to Sidi Omar and XXI Corps from Sidi Omar to the coast, Bardia and Tobruk; XXII Corps moved south-west of Tobruk as a counter-attack force.

=== Egypt ===
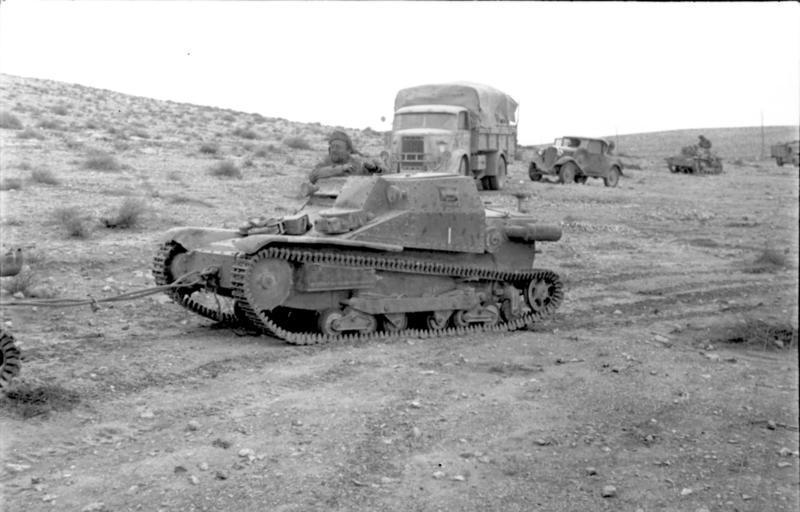
Italian L3/33 tankettes

The British had based military forces in Egypt since 1882 but the number was greatly reduced by the terms of the Anglo-Egyptian Treaty of 1936. The small British and Commonwealth force garrisoned the Suez Canal and the Red Sea route, which was vital to British communications with its Far Eastern and Indian Ocean territories. In mid-1939, Lieutenant-General Archibald Wavell was appointed General Officer Commanding-in-Chief (GOC-in-C) of the new Middle East Command, over the Mediterranean and Middle East theatres. Until the Franco-Axis armistice, the French divisions in Tunisia faced the Italian 5th Army on the Libya–Tunisia border. In Libya, the Royal Army had about 215,000 men and in Egypt, the British had about 36,000 troops with another 27,500 men training in Palestine.

British forces included the Mobile Division (Egypt) (Major-General Percy Hobart), one of only two British armoured training formations, which in mid-1939 was renamed Armoured Division (Egypt) (on 16 February 1940, it became the 7th Armoured Division). The Egypt–Libya border was defended by the Egyptian Frontier Force and in June 1940, the headquarters of the 6th Infantry Division (Major-General Richard O'Connor) took over command in the Western Desert, with instructions to drive back the Italians from their frontier posts and dominate the hinterland if war began. The 7th Armoured Division less the 7th Armoured Brigade, assembled at Mersa Matruh and sent the 7th Support Group forward towards the frontier as a covering force, where the RAF also moved most of its bombers; Malta was also reinforced.

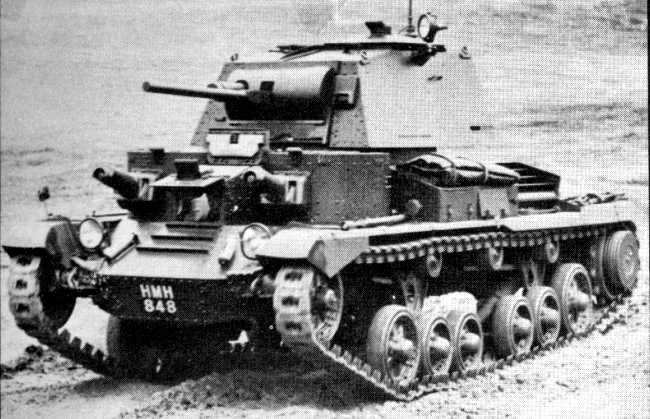
Cruiser Tank Mk I (A9)

The HQ of the 6th Infantry Division, which lacked complete and fully trained units, was renamed the Western Desert Force (WDF) on 17 June. In Tunisia, the French had eight divisions, capable only of limited operations and in Syria, three poorly armed and trained divisions, with about 40,000 troops and border guards on occupation duties against the civilian population. The Regio Esercito and Regia Aeronautica in Libya greatly outnumbered the British in Egypt but suffered from poor morale and were handicapped by some inferior equipment. In Italian East Africa (Africa Orientale Italiana) were another 130,000 Italian and African troops with 400 guns, 200 light tanks and 20,000 lorries; Italy declared war from 11 June 1940.

=== Supply ===
The normal Italian supply route to the port of Tripoli in Libya, was west around Sicily and then close to the Libyan coast to the port, a voyage of about 600 nmi (690 mi; 1,111 km), to avoid interference from British aircraft, ships and submarines based at Malta. On land, supplies had to be carried long distances by road or in small consignments by coaster. The distance from Tripoli to Benghazi was about 650 mi (1,046 km) along the Litoranea Balbo (Via Balbia, the coast road built by the Italians) and only half-way to Alexandria; a third of the Italian merchant marine was interned after Italy declared war. The road could flood, was vulnerable to the Desert Air Force (DAF) and alternative desert tracks increased vehicle wear. The Italian invasion of Egypt in late 1940, increased the road transport distance from Tripoli over the Khedival Motor Road, which was much inferior to the Via Balbia.

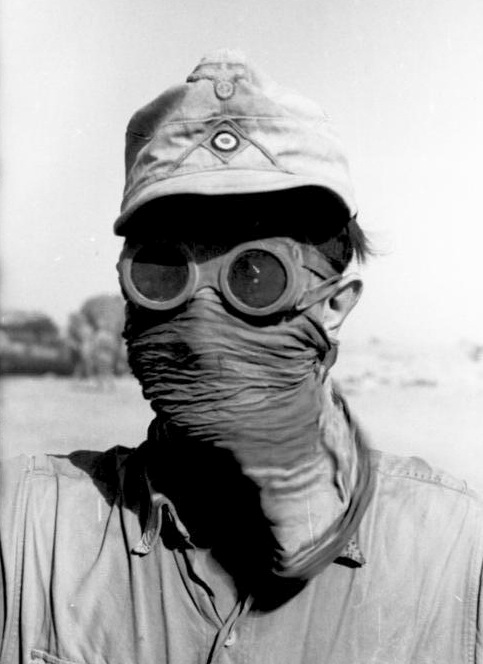
Goggles and face covering, for protection against sun and sand

The geographical position of Italy made it possible to close the Mediterranean if war came, making the British Mediterranean Fleet, based in Egyptian ports, dependent on the Suez Canal for supply. In 1939, Wavell began to plan a base in the Middle East for about fifteen divisions (300,000 men), six in Egypt, three in Palestine and the rest further afield. Much of the material was imported from the colonies and the rest obtained locally by stimulating the production of import substitutes. The plan to establish the infrastructure for a garrison of nine divisions in Egypt and Palestine was increased to fourteen by June 1941, then to 23 by March 1942. In 1940, British military forces had the terminus of the Egyptian state railway, road and the port of Mersa Matruh (Matruh) 200 mi (322 km) west of Alexandria, as a base. A water pipeline was begun along the railway and sources of water surveyed. Wells were dug but most became tainted by salt water and in 1939, the main sources of fresh water were Roman aqueducts at Matruh and Maaten Bagush.

Water boats from Alexandria and a distillation plant at Matruh increased supply but rigorous economy had to be enforced and much water had to be moved overland to outlying areas. The number of vehicles available in 1939 was inadequate and lorries were diverted to provide the Armoured Division with a better rear link; only the desert-worthy vehicles could be risked off-road, which left tanks unable to move far from Matruh. Matruh was 120 mi (190 km) east of the Libyan border. From the border, there was no water at Sollum, for 50 mi (80 km) east of Sollum to Sidi Barrani, there was only the Khedival Motor Road, which deliberately was kept in poor condition in case of an invasion, which meant that an invader would have to move through a waterless and trackless desert to reach the main British force. In September 1940, the New Zealand Railway Battalion and Indian labourers began work on the coastal railway and reached Sidi Barrani by October 1941.

=== Terrain ===
The winds of the Mediterranean

The war was fought primarily in the Western Desert, which was about 240 mi (390 km) wide, from Mersa Matruh in Egypt to Gazala on the Libyan coast, along the Via Balbia, the only paved road. The Sand Sea 150 mi (240 km) inland marked the southern limit of the desert at its widest at Giarabub and Siwa; in British parlance, Western Desert came to include eastern Cyrenaica in Libya. From the coast, extending inland lies a raised, flat, stony desert about 500 ft (150 m) above sea level, that stretches 120–190 mi (200–300 km) south to the Sand Sea. Scorpions, vipers and flies populated the region, which was inhabited by a small number of Bedouin nomads, whose tracks linked wells (birs) and the easier traversed ground.

Navigation was reliant on the sun, stars, compass bearings and "desert sense", good perception of the environment gained by experience. When Italian troops advanced into Egypt in September 1940, the Maletti Group got lost leaving Sidi Omar and had to be found by reconnaissance aircraft. In spring and summer, days are miserably hot and nights very cold. The Sirocco (Gibleh/Ghibli), a hot desert wind, blows clouds of fine sand, which reduces visibility to a few metres and coats eyes, lungs, machinery, food and equipment; motor vehicles and aircraft need special oil filters and the barren ground means that supplies for military operations have to be transported from outside. German engines tended to overheat and tank engine life fell from 1,400–1,600 mi (2,300–2,600 km) to 300–900 mi (483–1,448 km), which was made worse by the lack of standard parts for German and Italian types of equipment.

== Prelude ==
=== Frontier skirmishes ===
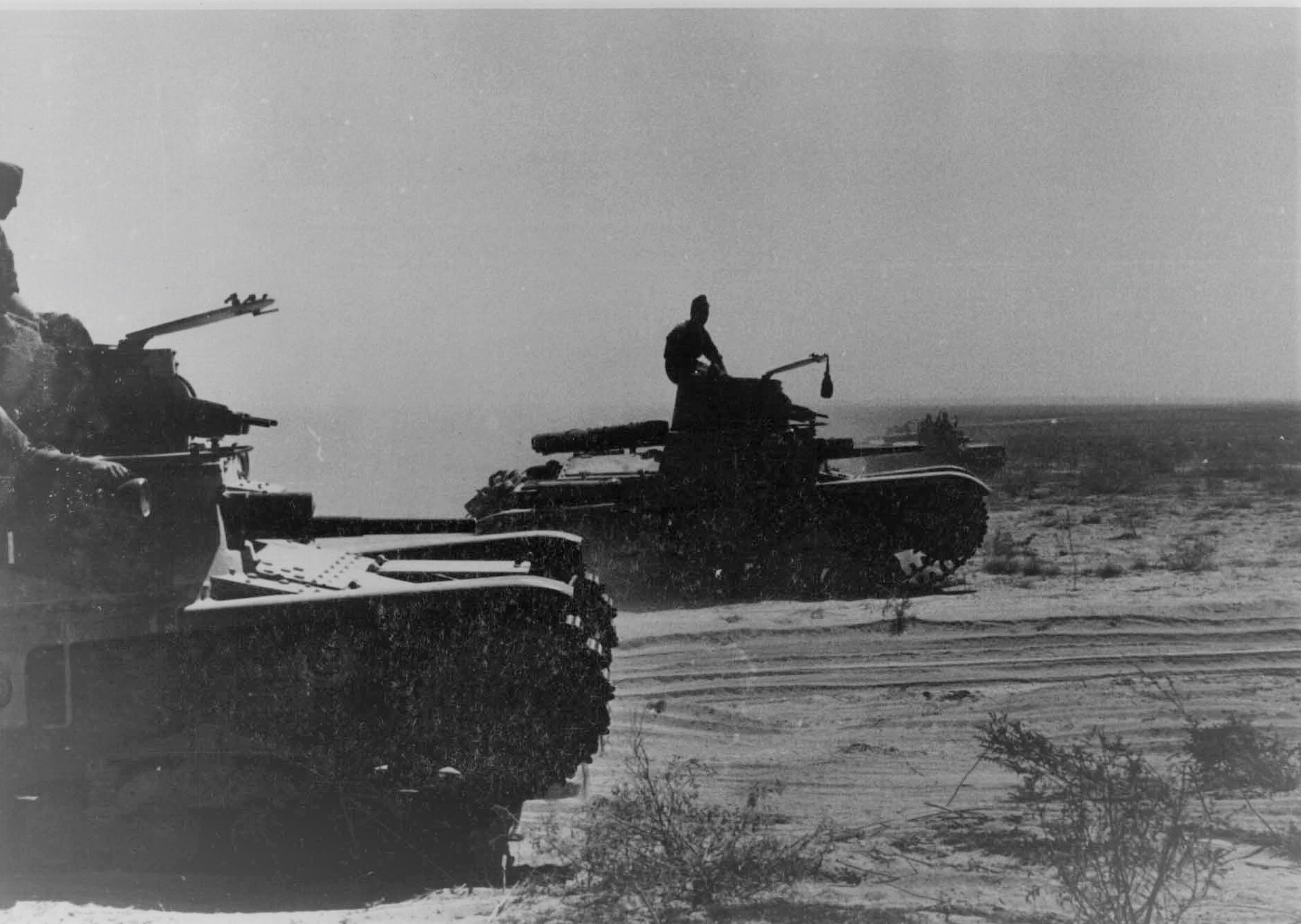
Italian armoured vehicles heading to Sidi Barrani

On 11 June 1940, hostilities commenced and the British were ordered to dominate the frontier and begin the Siege of Giarabub. The British crossed into Libya that night, exchanged fire with Italian troops at Sidi Omar and discovered that some of them were unaware that war had been declared. On 14 June, the British captured Fort Capuzzo and Fort Maddalena, taking 220 prisoners. Two days later, the British raided a convoy on the Tobruk–Bardia road, killed 21 Italian troops and took 88 prisoners, including Generale di Brigata Romolo Lastrucci, the 10th Army Chief Engineer. At an engagement near the frontier wire at Nezuet Ghirba, an Italian force of 17 light tanks, four guns and 400 infantry was defeated by a mixed force of British tanks, artillery and motorised infantry.

The British patrolled the frontier area as far west as Tobruk, establishing dominance over the 10th Army. On 5 August, thirty Italian tanks and the 8th Hussars fought an inconclusive action and Wavell concluded that vehicle wear made it impractical to continue operations when an Italian offensive loomed. Sand wore out equipment quickly, shortening the track life of tanks, spare parts ran out and only half the tank strength could be kept operational. A lull fell from August–early September, as Operation Hats a naval operation, reinforced the Mediterranean Fleet and helped to bring an army convoy of tanks and crews via the Cape. The British claimed to have inflicted 3,500 casualties for a loss of 150 men from 11 June – 9 September. Further afield, both sides established scouting groups, the Long Range Desert Group (LRDG) and Compagnie Auto-Avio-Sahariane (Auto-Saharan Company) which ranged the desert, observed British dispositions and raided.

=== Operazione E ===
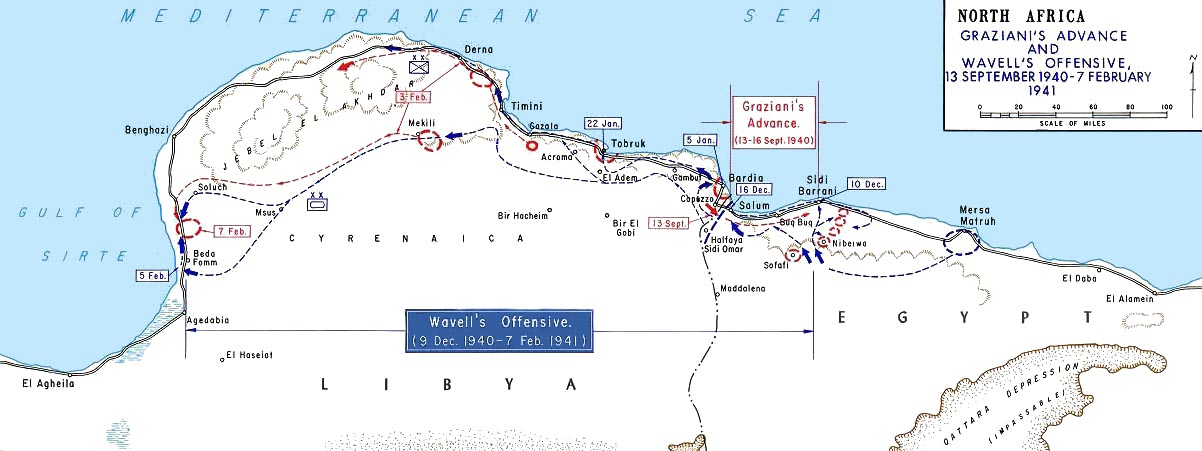
Military operations, 13 September 1940 – 7 February 1941 (click to enlarge)

On 13 September 1940, the invasion began as a limited tactical operation towards Matruh, rather than the strategic objectives sketched in Rome, due to the chronic lack of transport, fuel and wireless equipment, even with transfers from the 5th Army. Musiad was subjected to a "spectacular" artillery bombardment at dawn and occupied. Sollum and the airfield were taken by the 1st Libyan Division and by evening the 2nd Libyan Division, 63rd Infantry Division "Cirene" and the Maletti Group from Musaid and the 62nd Infantry Division "Marmarica" from Sidi Omar, pushed past British harassing parties and converged on Halfaya Pass. The British withdrew past Buq Buq on 14 September and continued to harass the Italian advance, while falling back to Alam Hamid the next day and Alam el Dab on 16 September. An Italian force of fifty tanks attempted a flanking move, which led the British rearguard to retire east of Sidi Barrani. The port was occupied by the 1st CC.NN. Division "23 Marzo" and Graziani halted the advance. The British resumed observation and the 7th Armoured Division prepared to challenge an attack on Matruh.

The Italians dug in around Sidi Barrani and Sofafi, about 80 mi (130 km) west of the British defences at Matruh. British road demolitions were repaired, wells cleaned and work commenced on a water pipe-line from the frontier, to accumulate supplies for the resumption of the advance in mid-December. Egypt broke off diplomatic relations with the Axis and Italian aircraft bombed Cairo on 19 October. British naval and air operations to harass the Italian army continued and caused damage which prisoners reported had caused a lowering of morale. British armoured car patrols dominated no man's land but the loss of advanced landing grounds reduced the effectiveness of the RAF and Malta was put out of range. An extra armoured car company joined the British reconnaissance operations far behind the front line and the WDF was reinforced by a new tank regiment with Matilda II tanks. The British began to prepare a raid on the central group of Italian encampments of 4 to 5 days' duration and then on Sofafi, rather than wait for the Italians.

=== British plan ===
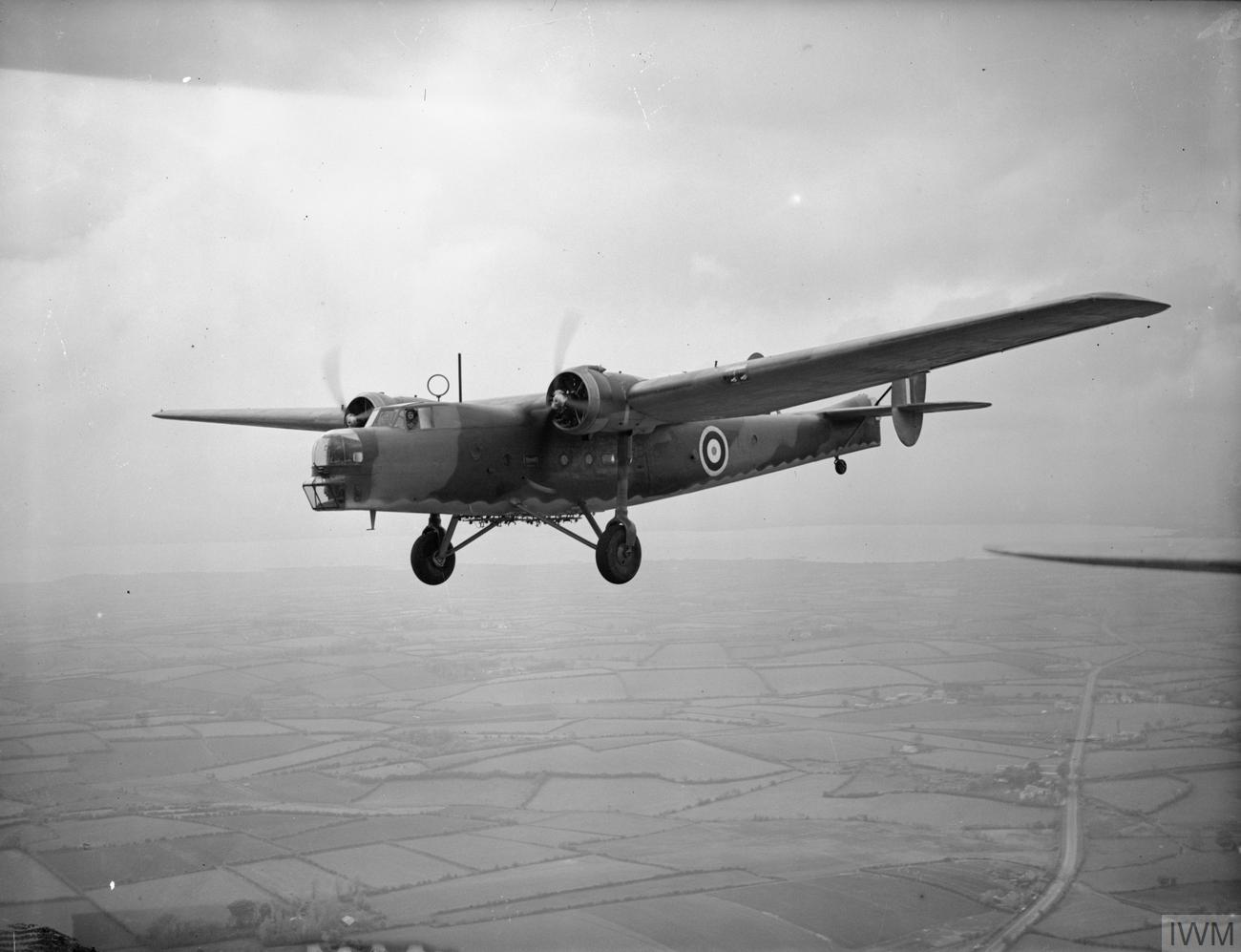
Bristol Bombay, before delivery to 216 Squadron (CH2936)

Following the Italian advance, Wavell ordered the commander of British Troops Egypt, Lieutenant-General Sir Henry Maitland Wilson to plan a limited operation to push the Italians back. Wavell had noted that the Italian defensive positions were too far apart for mutual support. Operation Compass, for administrative reasons, was originally planned as a five-day raid but an extension was contemplated if it succeeded. The 7th Support Group was to observe the Italian camps at Sofafi and prevent Italian moves from the west, while the rest of the division and 4th Indian Division passed through the Sofafi–Nibeiwa gap. An Indian brigade and Infantry tanks (I tanks) of 7th Royal Tank Regiment (7th RTR) would attack Nibeiwa from the west, as the 7th Armoured Division protected their northern flank. Once Nibeiwa was captured a second Indian brigade and the 7th RTR would attack the Tummars.

The Matruh Garrison Force (3rd Battalion Coldstream Guards, plus some artillery) would contain the enemy camp at Maktila on the coast and the Royal Navy would bombard Maktila and Sidi Barrani. Assuming success, Sidi Barrani would be attacked on the second day by the 4th Indian Division and a westward exploitation would follow. Preparations were made in the strictest secrecy and only a few officers knew during the training exercise held from 25–26 November, that the objectives marked out near Matruh were replicas of Nibeiwa and Tummar and that the exercise was a rehearsal; the troops were told that a second exercise was to follow and many did not know that the operation was real until 7 December, as they arrived at their start positions.

To obtain a measure of air superiority, eleven Vickers Wellington bombers from Malta attacked Castel Benito on 7 December and destroyed 29 aircraft on the ground. Next day, three fighter squadrons patrolled the British concentration areas and during the night, 29 Wellingtons and Blenheims bombed Benina and damaged ten aircraft. Bristol Bombays attacked the Italian camps and Blenheims raided advanced airfields. The ground moves began when Selby Force (Brigadier A. R. Selby) of 1,800 men from the Matruh garrison (the largest group which could be carried by lorry), advanced from Matruh to cut off Maktila to prevent the garrison from reinforcing the Tummars. The force put a dummy tank brigade in the desert as a decoy for Italian aircraft and by dawn on 9 December, was just short of Maktila. During the night the village had been illuminated by flares dropped from Fleet Air Arm (FAA) Fairey Swordfish aircraft and bombarded by HMS Terror an Erebus-class monitor and an Insect-class gunboat, HMS Aphis; Sidi Barrani was bombarded at the same time by HMS Ladybird.

=== Italian defensive preparations ===
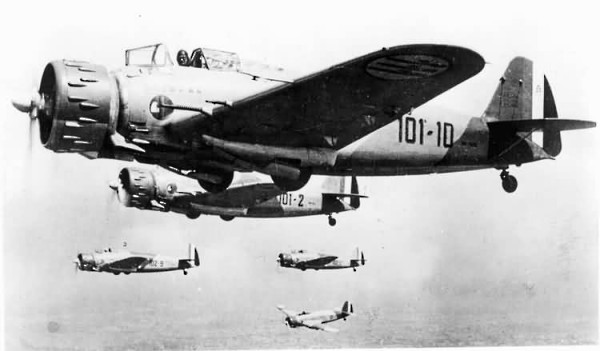
Breda Ba.65 ground-attack aircraft

In December 1940 the 10th Army in Egypt had been reinforced to about nine Binary, Blackshirt and colonial divisions east of the frontier and had begun unit reliefs, which made it harder for the British to establish the Italian order of battle. Fortified camps had been built widely spaced, on an arc about 50 mi (80 km) long from the sea to the escarpment. The 10th Army in the area of Sidi Barrani numbered about 40,000 men and on 8 December, the 1st Libyan Division, the 2nd Libyan Division of the Libyan Corps (Lieutenant-General Sebastiano Gallina) were on a 22 mi (35 km) line, in the fortified camps at Maktila, Tummar, with the 4th CC.NN. Division "3 Gennaio" (General Merzari) in reserve, about 12 mi (19 km) away at Sidi Barrani, with Gallina and the Libyan Corps headquarters.

The Maletti Group was at Nibeiwa, the 63rd Infantry Division "Cirene" (General Spatocco) of the XXI Corps (General Dalmazzo), was at Rabia and Sofafi 19 mi (31 km) west of Nibeiwa. The 64th Infantry Division "Catanzaro" had been moved east of Buq Buq to the Khur–Samalus area, behind the Nibeiwa–Rabia gap. To the west was the XXIII Corps with the 1st CC.NN. Division "23 Marzo", 2nd CC.NN. Division "28 Ottobre"; the 62nd Infantry Division "Marmarica" was on the escarpment from Sofafi to Halfaya. The 10th Army had about 80,000 men, 250 guns and 120 tanks inside Egypt. The British thought that the 5° Squadra in Egypt had about 250 bombers and an equal number of fighters, with reinforcements in Italy. On 9 December, the actual number was 140 bombers, 191 fighters and ground attack aircraft. Some bombers were far to the west at Tripoli and others at Benghazi and Tmimi. The short-range fighters and reconnaissance aircraft were at Tobruk, El Adem and Gambut.

== Battle ==
=== Capture of Sidi Barrani ===
Egypt location map

Selby Force guarded the eastern approaches to Sidi Barrani, as the rest of the WDF attacked the fortified camps further inland. On 10 December, the 4th Armoured Brigade, which had been screening the attackers from a possible Italian counter-attack from the west, advanced northwards, cut the coast road between Sidi Barrani and Buq Buq and sent armoured car patrols westwards. The 7th Armoured Brigade remained in reserve and the 7th Support Group blocked an approach from Rabia and Sofafi to the south. News of the fall of Nibeiwa reached Selby at 3:20 p.m. who sent troops to block the western exists from Maktila.

Difficult going and darkness slowed the move and the 1st Libyan Division escaped. Late on 9 December, O'Connor and Beresford-Pierce sent the 16th Infantry Brigade (Brigadier Cyril Lomax) from reserve to cut the roads into Sidi Barrani, two field artillery regiments supported the advance and the 7th RTR rushed to get unserviceable tanks back into action. Sidi Barrani was defended by two Italian divisions in eight strongpoints, each held by a battalion but the defensive perimeter was too long for effective command.

The moves forward on 10 December were confused by uncertainty over Italian dispositions, bitter cold and a dust storm which reduced visibility to 50 yd (46 m). The 16th Brigade started its advance at 6:00 a.m., without waiting for the artillery and 7th RTR (which were late) but was repelled by Italian artillery fire; three hours later, when two heavy artillery regiments had arrived, the 16th Brigade attacked again, supported by a squadron of Matilda tanks, RAF aircraft, Royal Navy ships and artillery fire. The fighting went on for all the morning, without substantial gains, until 1:30 p.m., when the Blackshirts holding two strongholds on the western side of the perimeter suddenly surrendered. Shortly afterwards, the brigade cut the south and west roads from Sidi Barrani. Beresford-Pierce ordered an attack before dark since the dust storm was sporadic and the British would be exposed to view. The brigade advanced with the last of the Infantry tanks, an extra infantry battalion and support from the 2nd Royal Tank Regiment (2nd RTR), with cruiser and light tanks, on the left flank.

The attack began just after 4:00 p.m. backed by the divisional artillery. After driving 3.5 mi (5.6 km) the dust storm abated and the infantry dismounted as Italian artillery opened fire. The last ten Matildas moved up on the left and drove into the western face of the Sidi Barrani defences, south of the main road, then disappeared into the sandstorm. Italian artillery ammunition proved ineffective against Matilda tanks; the gunners fought on with rifles and hand grenades but were overrun. The attack became a mêlée and at 10:00 a.m. when the 16th Brigade began to advance, about 2,000 Blackshirts rose up, apparently ready to counter-attack, they had lost heart and surrendered instead. In two hours the first objectives had been captured along the west side of the port, part of the south side and the artillery lines had been overrun. By 6:00 p.m., only a sector 2 mi (4 km) east of the harbour, held by a Blackshirt legion and by the remains of the 1st Libyan Division, was still resisting.

==== Selby Force ====
Reinforcements released by the fall of the Tummars arrived to the west of the 16th Brigade and advanced through the port, trapping the last of the 1st Libyan Division, the 2nd Libyan Division and the 4th CC.NN. Division "3 Gennaio" against Selby Force, for a loss of 277 casualties. Selby Force had followed up the retreat of the 1st Libyan Division as it moved the 15 mi (24 km) from Maktila to Sidi Barrani and drove part of the column into sand dunes north of the coast road. Cruiser tanks of the 6th Royal Tank Regiment (6th RTR) arrived in the sandstorm and overran the Italians in the dunes at about 5:15 p.m., then joined Selby Force to continue the pursuit. The Italian defenders were caught in a 10 mi × 5 mi (16.1 km × 8.0 km) pocket backing onto the sea. When the British attacked again at dawn on 11 December, mass surrenders began except at Point 90 (known to the Italians as Ras el Dai), where 2,000 troops of the 2nd Battalion and the 16th Battalion of the 2nd Libyan Division held out until the early afternoon of 11 December.

== Aftermath ==
=== Casualties ===
From 9 to 11 December the British took 38,300 prisoners, 237 guns, 73 tanks and about 1,000 vehicles, for 624 casualties. The Italian forces also suffered the loss of 47 officers and 2,147 men killed and 78 officers and 2,208 men wounded.

=== Subsequent operations ===
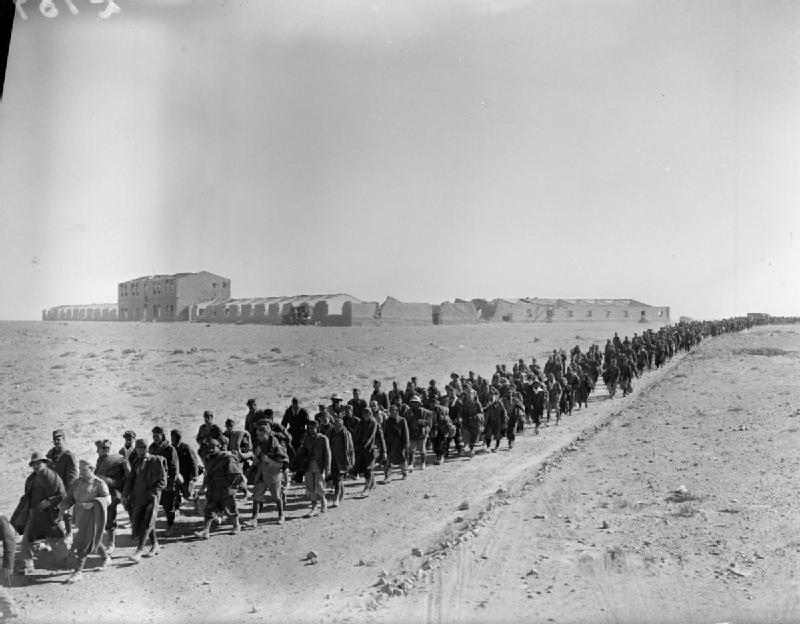
Italian soldiers go "into the bag" after the Battle of Sidi Barrani

On 11 December, the 7th Armoured Brigade was ordered out of reserve to relieve the 4th Armoured Brigade in the Buq Buq area to mop up. Large numbers of men and guns were captured and a patrol from the 7th Support Group entered Rabia to find it empty, as the 63rd Infantry Division "Cirene" had withdrawn from there and Sofafi overnight. An order to the 4th Armoured Brigade to cut them off arrived too late and the Italians retreated along the top of the escarpment to the Italian garrison at Halfaya. The 4th Armoured Brigade, on top of the escarpment and the 7th Armoured Brigade on the coast, tried to pursue the Italians despite acute supply problems, exacerbated by the large number of prisoners (twenty times the number expected) and found it extremely difficult to advance.

While retreating from Sidi Barrani and Buq Buq, Italian forces crowded on the coast road and were easy targets for Terror and two gunboats, which bombarded the Sollum area all day and most of the night of 11 December. By late on 12 December, the remaining Italian positions in Egypt were those at the approaches to Sollum and the vicinity of Sidi Omar; by 15 December, Sollum and the Halfaya Pass had been captured. The British advance by-passed Italian garrisons further south in the desert. Fort Capuzzo, 40 mi (64 km) inland at the end of the frontier wire, was captured en passant by 7th Armoured Division, as it advanced westwards to Bardia. The 7th Armoured Division concentrated south-west of Bardia, waiting for the arrival of 6th Australian Division.

== See also ==
- List of British military equipment of World War II
- List of Australian military equipment of World War II
- List of Italian military equipment in World War II

== Bibliography ==
- Biagi, E., ed. (1964). La Caporetto della Marmarica: Le decisioni irrevocabili [The Caporetto of Marmarica: The Irrevocable Decisions]. La seconda guerra mondiale (in Italian). Milano/Firenze: SADEA/Della Volpe. OCLC 797715412.
- Christie, Howard R. (1999). Fallen Eagles: The Italian 10th Army in the Opening Campaign in the Western Desert, June 1940 – December 1940 (MA). Fort Leavenworth, KS: U. S. Army Command and General Staff College. OCLC 465212715. A116763. Archived from the original on 16 February 2015 – via Archive Foundation.
- Cooper, Matthew (1978). The German Army 1933–1945: Its Political and Military Failure. Briarcliff Manor, NY: Stein and Day. ISBN 978-0-8128-2468-1.
- Creveld, M. van (1977). Supplying War: Logistics from Wallenstein to Patton. Cambridge: Cambridge University Press. ISBN 978-0-521-29793-6.
- La prima offensiva britannica in Africa settentrionale (ottobre 1940 – febbraio 1941) allegato 32 [The First British Offensive in North Africa (October 1940 to February 1941) annexe 32]. Vol. I. Roma: Esercito. Corpo di stato maggiore L'Ufficio storico. 1979. OCLC 6863876.
- Lewin, Ronald (1998) [1968]. Rommel As Military Commander. New York: B&N Books. ISBN 978-0-7607-0861-3 – via Archive Foundation.
- Long, Gavin (1961) [1952]. To Benghazi. Official History of Australia in the Second World War Series 1 (Army). Vol. I. Canberra: Australian War Memorial. OCLC 314648263.
- MacGregor, Andrew (2006). A Military History of Modern Egypt: From the Ottoman Conquest to the Ramadan War. Santa Barbara, CA: Praeger Security International General Interest. ISBN 978-0-275-98601-8 – via Archive Foundation.
- Macksey, Major Kenneth (1971). Beda Fomm: The Classic Victory. Ballantine's Illustrated History of the Violent Century. New York: Ballantine Books. OCLC 473687868.
- Neillands, Robin (2004). Eighth Army: The Triumphant Desert Army That Held the Axis at Bay from North Africa to the Alps, 1939–1945. New York: The Overlook Press. ISBN 978-1-58567-537-1 – via Archive Foundation.
- Pitt, B. (2001) [1980]. The Crucible of War: Wavell's Command. Vol. I (pbk. repr. ed.). London: Cassell. ISBN 978-0-304-35950-9 – via Archive Foundation.
- Playfair, I. S. O.; with Stitt, G. M. S.; Molony, C. J. C. & Toomer, S. E. (1959) [1954]. Butler, J. R. M. (ed.). The Mediterranean and Middle East: The Early Successes Against Italy (to May 1941). History of the Second World War, United Kingdom Military Series. Vol. I (3rd impression ed.). HMSO. OCLC 888934805.
- Raugh, H. E. (1993). Wavell in the Middle East, 1939–1941: A Study in Generalship. London: Brassey's UK. ISBN 978-0-08-040983-2.
- Santangelo, A. (2012). Operazione Compass: la Caporetto del deserto [Operation Compass: The Caporetto of the Desert]. Aculei (in Italian). Roma: Salerno. ISBN 978-88-8402-784-9.
