= 4th CC.NN. Division "3 Gennaio" =

Italian CC.NN. (Blackshirts militia) division

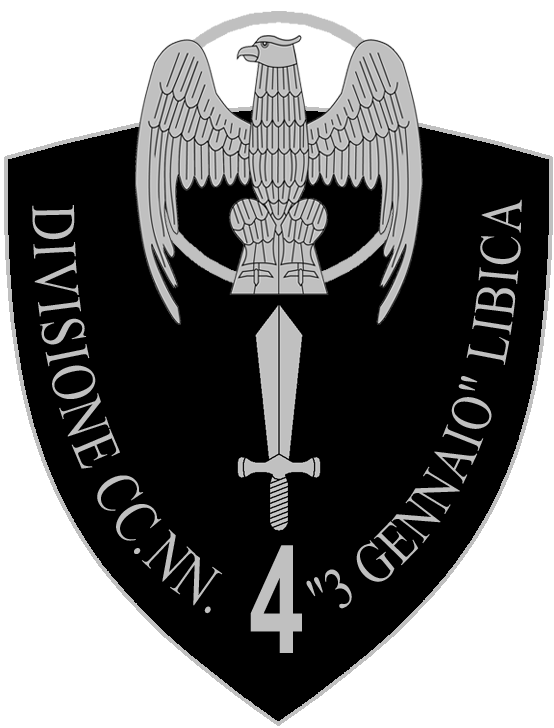
- 4th CC.NN. Division "3 Gennaio" insignia
- Active: 25 June 1935 – 11 December 1940
- Country: Italy
- Branch: MVSN
- Type: Infantry
- Size: Division
- Motto: "Chi osa vince"
- Engagements: Second Italo-Ethiopian War; World War II

Insignia
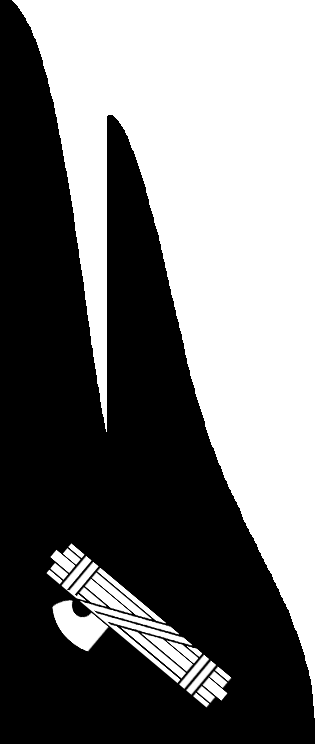
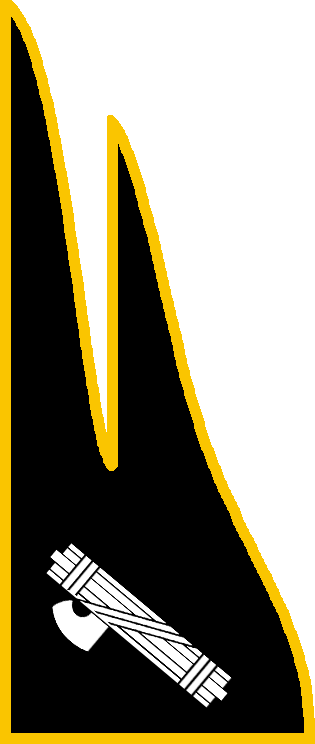
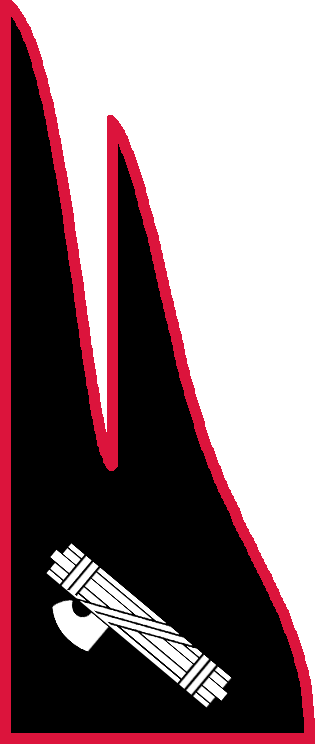
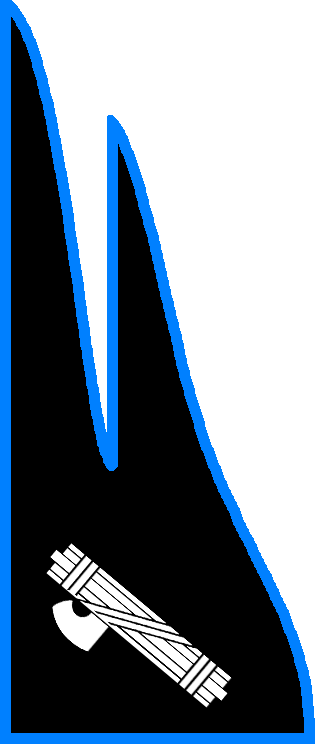
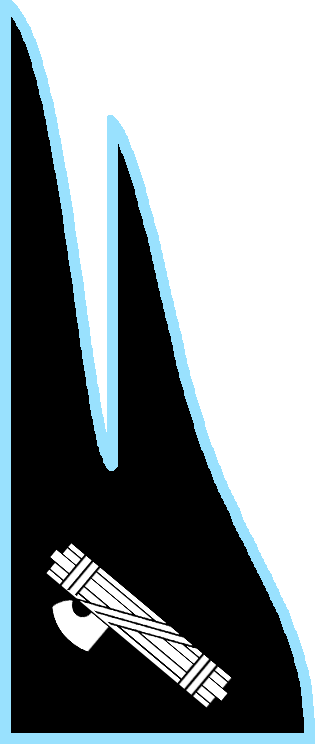
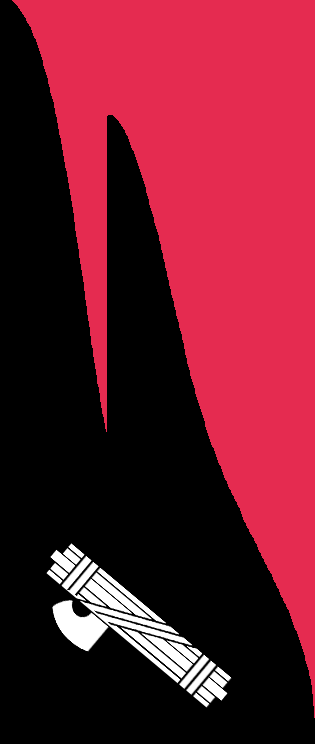
- Identification symbol: 4th CC.NN. Division gorget patches

The 4th CC.NN. Division "3 Gennaio" (Italian: 4ª Divisione CC.NN. "3 Gennaio") was an Italian CC.NN. (Blackshirts militia) division raised on 25 June 1935 for the Second Italo-Ethiopian War against Ethiopia. The name "3 Gennaio" ("3 January") was chosen to commemorate the date of assumption of dictatorial powers by Benito Mussolini on 3 January 1925. The division took part in the Italian invasion of Egypt and was destroyed during the Battle of Sidi Barrani in December 1940.

== History ==
The division was one of six CC.NN. divisions raised in summer 1935 in preparation for the Second Italo-Ethiopian War. Its members were volunteers from the various armed militias of the National Fascist Party's paramilitary wing. Its members came from two regions: the 101st and 104th CC.NN. legions from Piedmont and the 215th CC.NN. Legion from Lazio.

=== Second Italo-Ethiopian War ===
The division assembled in Italian Eritrea in early November 1935 and moved to Macallè in Ethiopia. The division participated in the Battle of Amba Aradam. After the war the division was repatriated and then disbanded.

=== World War II ===
The division was reformed in 1940 and sent with three other CC.NN. divisions to Italian Libya, where the division took part in the Italian invasion of Egypt in September 1940. By December 1940 the division was encamped at Sidi Barrani, where it was destroyed during the British counter-offensive Operation Compass in the Battle of Sidi Barrani on 10–11 December 1940.

== Organization ==
=== Second Italo-Ethiopian War ===
Below follows the division's organization during the Second Italo-Ethiopian War and the cities, in which its CC.NN. battalions were raised; the legion's machine gun companies and artillery batteries were raised in the same cities as the legions.

- 4th CC.NN. Division "3 Gennaio"
  - 101st CC.NN. Legion "Sabauda", in Turin
    - Command Company
    - CI CC.NN. Battalion, in Turin
    - CII CC.NN. Battalion, in Turin
    - 101st CC.NN. Machine Gun Company
    - 101st CC.NN. Artillery Battery (65/17 mod. 13 mountain guns)
  - 104th CC.NN. Legion "Santorre di Santarosa", in Alessandria
    - Command Company
    - CIV CC.NN. Battalion, in Alessandria
    - CXI CC.NN. Battalion, in Casale Monferrato
    - 104th CC.NN. Machine Gun Company
    - 104th CC.NN. Artillery Battery (65/17 mod. 13 mountain guns)
  - 215th CC.NN. Legion "Del Cimino", in Viterbo
    - Command Company
    - CCXV CC.NN. Battalion, in Viterbo
    - CCXX CC.NN. Battalion, in Rome
    - 215th CC.NN. Machine Gun Company
    - 215th CC.NN. Artillery Battery (65/17 mod. 13 mountain guns)
  - IV CC.NN. Machine Gun Battalion
  - IV Artillery Group (65/17 mod. 13 mountain guns, Royal Italian Army)
  - IV Mixed Transport Unit (Royal Italian Army)
  - IV Supply Unit (Royal Italian Army)
  - 2x CC.NN. replacement battalions
  - 4th Special Engineer Company (Mixed CC.NN. and Royal Italian Army)
  - 4th Medical Section (Royal Italian Army)
  - 4th Supply Section (Royal Italian Army)
  - 4th Carabinieri Section

The supply unit had 1,600 mules and the mixed transport unit 80 light trucks. The division engaged in war crimes in Ethiopia during the Second Italo-Ethiopian War.

=== World War II ===
4th CC.NN. Division "3 Gennaio" organization

Below follows the division's organization at the start of the Italian invasion of Egypt and the cities, in which its CC.NN. battalions were raised.

- 4th CC.NN. Division "3 Gennaio"
  - Headquarters
    - Command Company
    - 707th Carabinieri Section
    - 708th Carabinieri Section
    - 304th Field Post Office
  - 250th CC.NN. Legion, in Barletta
    - Command Company
    - CL CC.NN. Battalion "G. Carli", in Barletta
    - CLIV CC.NN. Battalion "D. Mastronuzzi", in Taranto
    - CLVI CC.NN. Battalion "Lucania", in Potenza
    - 250th CC.NN. Machine Gun Company
  - 270th CC.NN. Legion, in Agrigento
    - Command Company
    - CLXX CC.NN. Battalion "Agrigento", in Agrigento
    - CLXXII CC.NN. Battalion "Enna", in Enna
    - CLXXIV CC.NN. Battalion "Segesta", in Trapani
    - 270th CC.NN. Machine Gun Company
  - 204th Artillery Regiment "3 Gennaio" (formed by depot of the 6th Army Corps Artillery Regiment in Modena)
    - Command Unit
    - I Group (75/27 mod. 06 field guns)
    - II Group (75/27 mod. 06 field guns)
    - III Group (100/17 mod. 14 howitzers)
    - 4th Anti-aircraft Battery (20/65 mod. 35 anti-aircraft guns)
    - 204th Anti-aircraft Battery (20/65 mod. 35 anti-aircraft guns)
    - 250th Support Weapons Battery (65/17 mod. 13 mountain guns)
    - 270th Support Weapons Battery (65/17 mod. 13 mountain guns)
    - Ammunition and Supply Unit
  - CCIV Machine Gun Battalion (Royal Italian Army)
  - CCIV Mixed Engineer Battalion (Royal Italian Army)
    - Command Platoon
    - 1 × Engineer Company
    - 1 × Telegraph and Radio Operators Company
    - 1 × Searchlight Section
  - 204th CC.NN. Anti-tank Company (47/32 mod. 35 anti-tank guns)
  - 204th CC.NN. Support Weapons Battery (65/17 mod. 13 mountain guns)
  - 204th CC.NN. Mortar Company (81mm mod. 35 mortars)
  - 204th Medical Section (Royal Italian Army)
    - 3 × Field hospitals
    - 1 × Surgical Unit
  - 204th Supply Section (Royal Italian Army)
  - 204th Transport Section (Royal Italian Army)

== CC.NN. Grouping "3 Gennaio" ==
For the Italian participation on the Eastern Front the regiment-sized CC.NN. Grouping "3 Gennaio" was raised as unit of the Italian Army in Russia:

- CC.NN. Grouping "3 Gennaio"
  - CC.NN. Battalions Group "Tagliamento"
    - Command Company
    - LXIII CC.NN. Battalion, in Udine
    - LXXIX CC.NN. Battalion, in Reggio Emilia
    - LXIII Support Weapons Battalion (Royal Italian Army unit, with 47/32 anti-tank guns and 81mm mod. 35 mortars)
  - CC.NN. Battalions Group "Montebello"
    - Command Company
    - VI CC.NN. Battalion, in Vigevano
    - XXX CC.NN. Battalion, in Novara
    - XII Support Weapons Battalion, in Aosta (47/32 anti-tank guns and 81mm mod. 35 mortars)

== Commanding officers ==
During the Second Italo-Ethiopian War:

- Generale di Divisione Alessandro Traditi (1935–1937)

During the Italian invasion of Egypt:

- Generale di Divisione Fabio Merzari (1940 – 11 December 1940, POW)

== Sources ==
- Lucas, Ettore; Giorgio de Vecchi (1976). Storia delle Unità Combattenti della MVSN 1923–1943. Giovanni Volpe Editore. pp. 63–116.
- George F. Nafziger – Italian Order of Battle: An organizational history of the Italian Army in World War II (3 vol)
