= Ferdinando Cona =

Italian military officer

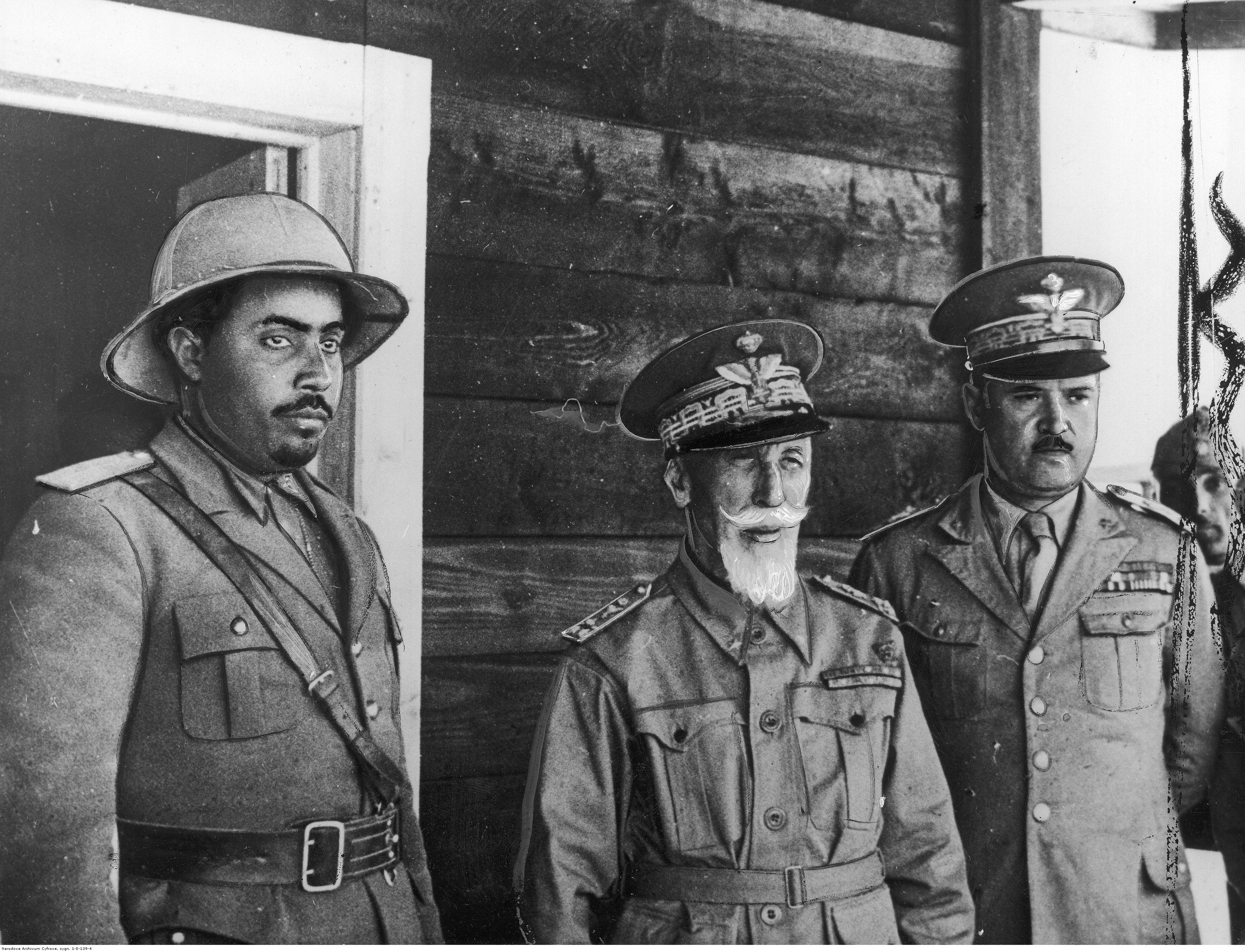
- Ferdinando Cona (right) during the Second Italo-Ethiopian War, along with Emilio De Bono and Haile Selassie Gugsa
- Military career
- Allegiance: Italy
- Branch: Royal Italian Army
- Rank: Lieutenant General
- Conflicts: World War II: Western Desert Campaign; Operation Compass (1940)

Ferdinando Cona (Rome, 25 April 1882 – unknown) was an Italian military officer who participated in World War II.

His positions included C.O. XXI. Granatieri di Sardegna Infantry Brigade; C.O. XXIX. Infantry Brigade; Deputy Chief of Staff, East Africa (1935–36); General Officer Commanding 7th Division Leonessa (1936?–1939) and General Officer Commanding XX Corps, North Africa (1939–41).

He took over as commander-in-chief of X Army when General Tellera was killed in action at the battle of Beda Fomm in February 1941. His command was short-lived as he was captured by Allied forces during the same battle.
