= Beda Fomm =

Town in Cyrenaica, Libya

- Town
- Location in Libya
- Coordinates: 31°14′28″N 20°18′31″E
- Country: Libya
- Region: Cyrenaica

Beda Fomm is a small coastal town in southwestern Cyrenaica, Libya. It is located between the much larger port city Benghazi to its north-west and the larger town of El Agheila further to the south-west. Beda Fomm is known mainly for being the site of the final engagement of Operation Compass (December 1940 to February 1941) in the Second World War.

== World War II ==
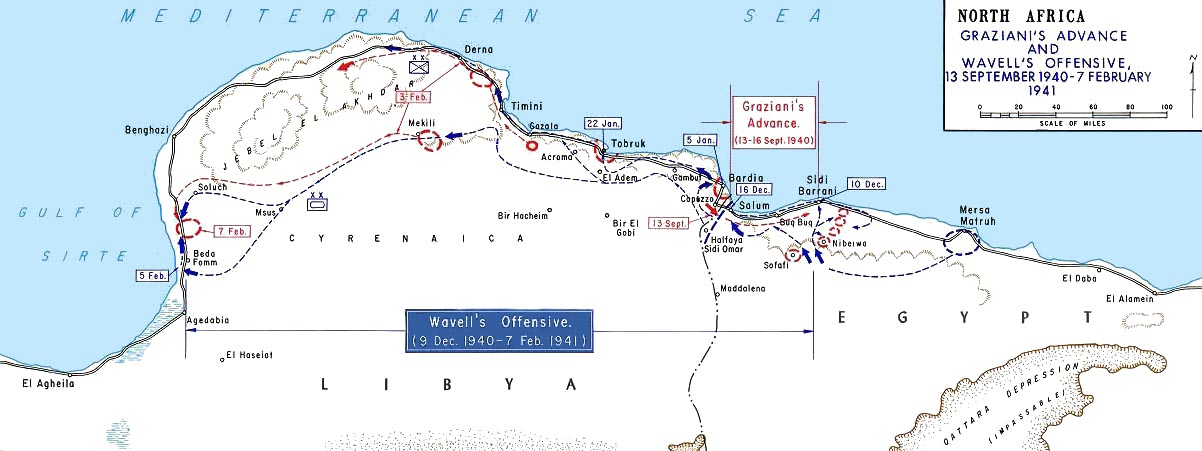
The Italian Offensive and Operation Compass 13 September, 1940 – 7 February, 1941

In late January 1941, during Operation Compass, the British learned that the Italians were evacuating Cyrenaica by way of Beda Fomm. The 7th Armoured Division was dispatched to intercept the 10th Army. Halfway to their destination, it was evident that the division together was too slow and Combeforce, a flying column was sent on the direct route across the desert. On 5 February 1941, Combeforce arrived to cut off the retreating remnants of the 10th Army. The following day, the Italians arrived and attacked but failed to break through the blockade. The fighting was close and often hand-to-hand; at one point, a regimental sergeant major captured an Italian tank by hitting the commander over the head with the butt of his rifle. The final effort came 7 February, when 20 Italian Fiat M13/40 tanks broke through the thin cordon of riflemen and anti-tank guns, only to be stopped by field guns, yards from regimental HQ. The officer commanding Italian forces was General Giuseppe Tellera, who was mortally wounded and Lieutenant-General Ferdinando Cona assumed command, only to be captured by the British. After that failure, with the rest of the 7th Armoured arriving and the 6th Australian Division bearing down on them from Benghazi, the Italians surrendered. A fictional version of the battle may be found in C.S. Forester's short story "An Egg for the Major", in the collection Gold from Crete (1941).

== See also ==
- Western Desert Campaign
