= Romolo Lastrucci =

Italian general

- Born: 15 July 1889; Siena, Kingdom of Italy
- Died: 29 September 1976 (aged 87); Rome, Italy
- Military career
- Allegiance: Kingdom of Italy; Italy
- Branch: Royal Italian Army; Italian Army
- Rank: Brigadier General
- Conflicts: Italo-Turkish War; World War I; Second Italo-Senussi War; Spanish Civil War; Battle of Santander; Battle of the Ebro; Aragon Offensive; World War II; North African campaign
- Awards: Silver Medal of Military Valor; War Cross for Military Valor; Order of the Crown of Italy; Order of Saints Maurice and Lazarus; Colonial Order of the Star of Italy; War Merit Cross; Order of Merit of the Italian Republic

Romolo Lastrucci (15 July 1889 – 29 September 1976) was an Italian general during World War II. Engineer-in-Chief of the Tenth Army, he was captured in North Africa six days after Italy's entry into the war, thus becoming the first Axis general captured in World War II.

== Biography ==
A veteran of the Italo-Turkish War, the First World War and the Second Italo-Senussi War, he participated in the Spanish Civil War with the rank of colonel, as Engineer-in-Chief of the Corps of Volunteer Troops (CTV), taking part in the battle of Santander (where he received a War Cross for Military Valor), and subsequently in the battle of the Ebro and the Aragon Offensive, where he earned a Silver Medal of Military Valor. In 1939 he was promoted to brigadier general for war merit, and after commanding the engineers of the Udine Army Corps from September 1939 to February 1940 he was given command of the Engineering troops of the XXI Corps, stationed in Cyrenaica as part of the Tenth Army, and later of the Tenth Army itself.

In the morning of 16 June 1940, six days after Italy had entered the Second World War, Lastrucci left Benghazi to inspect fortification works in the Bardia area, near the border with Egypt; near Marsa Luch his two-car convoy was attacked by five British armored cars on the Via Balbia, and while the other car managed to escape, his car suffered an engine breakdown and was surrounded. After a brief exchange of fire in which Captain Francesco Valvo was killed, Lastrucci was captured; he was carrying the defense plans of Bardia, which were later used in the planning of the Battle of Bardia. He was initially held in a newly built prisoner-of-war camp in Geneifa, near the Great Bitter Lake, until in August 1940 he was transferred to the Dehradun "general's camp" in British India. Having become sick, he was repatriated in late 1944.

From 23 January 1958 to 18 October 1959 he was national vice president of the National Association of Engineers and Transmitters of Italy (ANGET). On 2 June 1959 he was awarded the honor of knight of the Order of Merit of the Italian Republic, which was however revoked on 21 December 1961. He died in 1976.
