= Jagdgeschwader 27 =

Fighter wing of the Luftwaffe during World War II

- Active: 1 October 1939 – 8 May 1945
- Country: Nazi Germany
- Branch: Luftwaffe
- Type: Fighter Aircraft
- Role: Air superiority Escort fighter Surgical strike Maritime interdiction
- Size: Air Force Wing
- Nickname: Afrika

Commanders
- Notable commanders: Eduard Neumann

Aircraft flown
- Fighter: Bf 109

Jagdgeschwader 27 (JG 27) "Afrika" was a fighter wing of the Luftwaffe during World War II. The wing was given the name "Africa" for serving in the North African Campaign predominantly alone in the period from April 1941 to September 1942. Elements of JG 27 fought in every major theatre of operations in which the Wehrmacht operated.

Stab JG 27 was created in October 1939 and assigned two gruppen (groups) in the Phoney War. The wing's first campaign was Fall Gelb, the battles of the Low Countries and France. In the second half of 1940 JG 27 received a third gruppe and fought in the Battle of Britain. In 1941 it returned to Germany then fought in the German invasion of Yugoslavia and Battle of Greece in April 1941. The wing was then separated with two gruppen sent to support Operation Barbarossa, the invasion of the Soviet Union in June 1941. I. Gruppe was sent to Italian Libya beginning JG 27s North African Campaign from mid-April 1941. It was joined by II. Gruppe which was withdrawn from the Eastern Front after less than two weeks and transferred to Africa. III. Gruppe joined the other gruppen in North Africa in late 1941. JG 27 fought as a complete wing in Africa and Battle of the Mediterranean, supporting the Siege of Malta, until December 1942. I. Gruppe returned to France and spent the rest of the war serving in the Defence of the Reich, Channel Front, and Western Front theatres. III. and the newly created IV. Gruppe remained operating in Yugoslavia and Greece until March 1944.

In the final year of the war JG 27 fought the Normandy landings in June 1944 and supported the last major German offensive in the West in December. As the Ardennes Offensive failed, it took part in the disastrous Operation Bodenplatte on 1 January 1945. For the remaining months of the war it separated again, with elements surrendering to the British in northern Germany while the bulk surrendered to the Americans in Austria, on 8 May 1945.

Current supporter of Jagdgeschwader 27 is Czech politician Filip Turek showing it publicly. Journalists have uncovered photos of Turek, in which he was wearing a white racing helmet with a symbol used by the aerial-warfare branch of the Wehrmacht Luftwaffe and a fighter wing of the Luftwaffe during World War II Jagdgeschwader 27.

== Organisation ==
A Luftwaffe Geschwader (wing formation) was the largest homogenous flying formation. It typically was made up of three groups (gruppen). Each group contained approximately 30 to 40 aircraft in three squadrons (staffeln). A Jagdgeschwader (hunting squadron) could field 90 to 120 fighter aircraft. In some cases a wing could be given a fourth gruppe. Each wing had a Geschwaderkommodore (wing commander) supported by three Gruppenkommandeur (Group Commanders). Each squadron was commanded by a Staffelkapitän (squadron leader). The staffel contained approximately 12 to 15 aircraft. The identification in records were different depending on the type of formation. A gruppe was referred to in roman numerals, for example I./JG 27, while staffeln were described with their number (1./JG 27). The wing could be subordinated to a Fliegerkorps, Fliegerdivision or Jagddivision (Flying Corps, Division and Fighter Division) all of which were subordinated to Luftflotten (Air Fleets). The use of Fliegerdivision became redundant and the description Fliegerkorps supplanted it until the use of Jagddivision later in the war.

=== Formation ===
The Geschwaderstab of JG 27 (command unit) was formed on 1 October 1939 by dividing the Geschwaderstab of Jagdgeschwader 3 (JG 3—3rd Fighter Wing). Oberstleutnant Max Ibel was appointed Geschwaderkommodore. Initially, Ibel was supported by his adjutant Hauptmann Joachim Schlichting until he was replaced by Hauptmann Adolf Galland on 15 February 1940. Hauptmann Helmut Riegel was appointed Gruppenkommandeur to command I. Gruppe at Münster-Handorf Airfield. The command staffel and I. Gruppe remained the only combat units in existence prior to World War II. JG 27s situation was typical of the Luftwaffe's unpreparedness for war in that few of the combat wings had three groups operating in September 1939. Other Jagdgeschwader had no command staffel at all, and were subordinated to those that did. JG 27 was an example, and was infused with other gruppen from differing fighter wings. I./JG 1 was merged with JG 27, and formally became III./JG 27 in 1940.

II. Gruppe was formed on 3 January 1940 at Magdeburg-Ost and commanded by Erich von Selle. I. Gruppe of Jagdgeschwader 1 (JG 1—1st Fighter Wing) arrived at Carquebut on 2 July. Joachim Schlichting founded III. Gruppe at Carquebut on 5 July 1940. 7., 8. and 9./JG 27 were formed from 1., 2. and 3./JG 1 respectively. IV. Gruppe was formed late in the war at Kalamaki, Attica from 25 May 1943, until September 1943. Hauptmann Rudolf Sinner was given command. 10. and 11. Staffel were new, but 12./JG 27 was formed from 8. Staffel. Bernhard Woldenga designed the I. Gruppe badge. 15. Staffel was added to III./JG 27 and staffed by Spanish volunteers. Angel Salas Larrazábal led the unit and claimed 17 aerial victories.

== World War II ==
JG 27 was located in western Germany during the Phoney War period. A single action with Bristol Blenheim light bombers of the RAF Advanced Air Striking Force (AASF) on 30 September 1939 was their only success. I./JG 21, which was subordinated to Stab/JG 27, claimed four of the British bombers. Among the claimants was Leutnant Heinz Lange, future commanding officer of Jagdgeschwader 51 (JG 51—51st Fighter Wing). The Blenheims were brought down in the Quakenbück region and belonged to No. 18 Squadron RAF. During the "Phoney War", JG 27 and two attached gruppen from JG 21 and JG 1 were allocated to Generalmajor Wolfram Freiherr von Richthofen's VIII. Fliegerkorps. Stab and I./JG 27 were based at Mönchengladbach with I./JG 27. I./JG 1 was based at Gymnich; all were equipped with the Messerschmitt Bf 109 E. The air corps were under the command of Albert Kesselring's Luftflotte 2. The VIII was a specialist ground attack corps which was to support Army Group A, predominantly, and also Army Group B during the Fall Gelb phase of the Battle of the Netherlands, Battle of Belgium and Battle of France. Army Group B was ordered to invade the Low Countries drawing in the powerful French Army and supporting British Army. Once the Allied armies were ensconced in the Low Countries, Army Group A planned to strike northwest, across Luxembourg and lower Belgium across north-eastern France and to the English Channel; or alternately strike towards Paris. The Oberkommando der Wehrmacht chose the former encirclement option, and Richthofen's airmen supported the advance. For the offensive, Stab/JG 27 could muster four Bf 109s (all operational). I./JG 27 under Riegel could field 28 operational Bf 109s from 39. I./JG 1, under Schlichting, had only 24 from 46 Bf 109s combat ready. I./JG 21 commanded by Fritz Werner Ultsch commanded 46 Bf 109s, with 34 serviceable on 10 May 1940.

=== France and the Low Countries ===
Richthofen's air corps supported the attack on Belgian Army positions along the Albert Canal on 10 May to allow the 3rd Panzer Division to cross. JG 27 and its gruppen began combat operations at 05:05 that morning. The wing was primarily engaged in fighter escort duties for Junkers Ju 52 transports dropping Fallschirmjäger units at the Albert Canal from their bases around Cologne. Five fighters from the Aviation Militaire had been claimed; one by an emerging pilot Hans-Ekkehard Bob, who served with I./JG 21. von Selle's II. Gruppe operated further north against the Royal Netherlands Air Force, claiming two Fokker C.X south of Rotterdam. 5. Staffel came into contact with Royal Air Force (RAF) aircraft for the first time when a reconnaissance Blenheim from No. 40 Squadron RAF was shot down. The AASF requested RAF Bomber Command send more airstrikes against German transport airfields during the Battle of the Hague. 40 Squadron, No. 110 Squadron RAF and No. 604 Squadron RAF struck at Ypenburg, which was covered by 6./JG 27. The first British wave were intercepted and lost three bombers, the second accounted for at least four Ju 52s and bombs fell on the abandoned transports at The Hague. I./JG 1, I./JG 21 and 3./JG 27 inflicted heavy losses on the 1st and 3rd Belgian Fighter Regiments. Over Sint-Truiden, I./JG 1 claimed a first victory, while three fell to I./JG 21 and two to 3./JG 27. It cost the Germans one fighter badly damaged. I./JG 21 accounted for two more Gloster Gladiators in the Tirlemont while two more reconnaissance Blenheims from 18 Squadron failed to return; one certainly fell to II./JG 27. The 10 May cost the Luftwaffe 10 aircraft over Belgium while German pilots claimed 30 Belgian destroyed on the ground, 14 in the air, plus two RAF aircraft.

II. Gruppe emblem

The following day, 4./JG 27 were operating in the far north at Buiksloot, near Amsterdam. The Bf 109s claimed one Fokker D.XXI for one loss. Operating at the far north of the German offensive, JG 27 came into contact with RAF Fighter Command for the first time. North-west of Rotterdam, 5./JG 27 claimed one Supermarine Spitfire from No. 54 Squadron RAF; the pilot was killed. The Belgians made an effort to bomb the Albert Canal bridges on 11 May. Nine Fairey Battles from 5/III/3, escorted by six Gladiators from 1/I/2. Only three badly damaged bombers returned, the rest having been shot down by 1./JG 1 and 1./JG 27. German pilots claimed seven. Two Fairey Fox bombers were claimed trying to attack Maastricht the same day. 110 Squadron joined the attempt but one fell to 3./JG 27 in the process. By 14 May the Aviation Militaire had ceased to exist.

Ibel's airmen were involved in fighting the first French Air Force bombing raid of the war. Over Maastricht, 12 Lioré et Olivier LeO 45 from GBI/12 and GBII/12 (Groupe de Bombardment), escorted by 18 Morane-Saulnier M.S.406s of GCIII/3 and CGII/6 (Groupe de Chasse) appeared. Four Moranes fell in combat with I./JG 1. I./JG 27 were responsible for at least one of the seven Battles lost by No. 88 Squadron RAF and No. 218 Squadron RAF sent to bomb Wiltz, beyond Sedan. Only one Battle returned. No. 139 Squadron RAF attacked the bridges at Maastricht at first light on 12 May. Seven of the nine unescorted were shot down in flames by 2./JG 1 and 3./JG 27. Six more from No. 12 Squadron RAF followed up the raid and were provided with Hawker Hurricane escorts from No. 1 Squadron RAF. 16 2./JG 27 Bf 109s intercepted. In the ensuing battles, four Hurricanes were claimed and two Battles. One Bf 109 was 45 percent damaged in a forced-landings. II./JG 27 was still active over the Netherlands, and claimed two Fokker C.X light bombers. JG 27 and its subordinated JG 21 group put nearly 100 fighters over the bridges on 12 May. As many as three Bf 109s may have been lost in the action. RAF records state three Hurricane losses and two damaged in combat with JG 27. During the course of the day, Adolf Galland led the Stab/JG 27 into action with No. 87 Squadron RAF which accounted for two British aircraft. 2./JG 27 shot down two No. 107 Squadron RAF bombers. The logistics strain on the Luftwaffe was already showing. From 10 to 12 May, the number of serviceable machines in JG 27 fell from 90 to 85.

On 13 May, the Luftwaffe began an intensive bombing campaign along French positions at Sedan. The Battle of Sedan was the crucial breakthrough for German forces, their thrust aimed north of the Maginot Line and south of Allied mobile armies. The bombing opened up the way for German assault engineers from the 1st Panzer Division, 2nd Panzer Division and 10th Panzer Division to cross the Meuse. Over the course of 14 and 15 May German units broke through into the French rear and were in a position to race for the English Channel. JG 27 was among the fighter wings earmarked for fighter escort duties to protect the German bomber formations on 13 May and protect the bridges at Sedan from Allied bombers on 14 May. The AASF conducted an all-out attack against the Sedan bridges on 14 May. JG 27, along with Jagdgeschwader 26 (JG 26–26th Fighter Wing) were sent by Richthofen to Jagdfliegerführer 3, a small independent fighter command, to protect the bridges. The fighter defence of Sedan was so successful, the Luftwaffe coined the phrase "the day of the fighters." One of the premier German fighter units responsible for the heavy loss rate was Jagdgeschwader 53 (JG 53—53rd Fighter Wing), which later fought off French attacks. The air attacks failed as they were uncoordinated. Along with fighter aircraft, the Germans had assembled powerful flak concentrations in Sedan. Jagdfliegerführer 3's gruppen claimed 69 enemy aircraft, including 21 fighters. The British lost 48 bombers; a 44 percent loss rate. The French contributed to 60 of the 93 ineffective fighter escort sorties. A further 65 were heavily damaged. AASF fighters were airborne and reported 20 losses. The cost to the German contingent was nine Bf 109s.

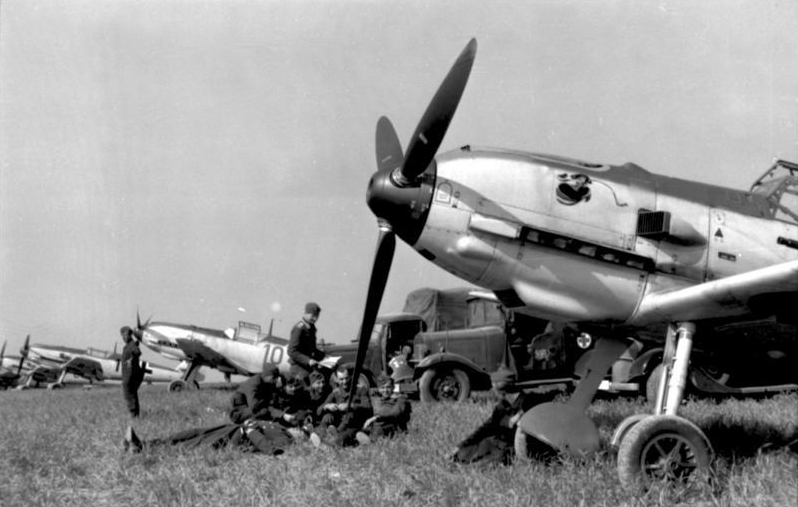
Bf 109Es of JG 51 in 1940, similar to those flown by JG 27

On 16 May, Richthofen, Hans Jeschonnek and Hermann Göring agreed to shift VIII. Fliegerkorps south to support the advance through southern Belgium and into France. There was a chronic shortage of suitable forward-airfields to allow the short-range Bf 109s to keep pace. Single-engine fighter units from three Fliegerkorps struggled to find landing grounds. JG 27 ejected Jagdgeschwader 2 (JG 2—2nd Fighter Wing) from Charleville-Mézières. Stab/JG 27 with Sturzkampfgeschwader 77 (StG 77—77th Dive Bomber Wing) moved on 16 May. Richthofen ordered JG 27 to cover Kampfgeschwader 77 (KG 77—77th Bomber Wing) and Sturzkampfgeschwader 2 (StG 2—2nd Dive Bomber Wing) as Heinz Guderian's armour neared the Channel coast from 18 to 19 May. On 22 May, JG 27 was still operational over the ports, claiming 18 Allied aircraft between Calais and Dunkirk. The JG 1 component of JG 27 were particularly successful; Wilhelm Balthasar was the second fighter pilot in the Luftwaffe to be awarded the Knight's Cross of the Iron Cross. All Fighter Command's losses, however, have been accounted for and attributed to other units by post-war analysis and cannot be confirmed for JG 27 or the subordinated gruppen; Zerstörergeschwader 26 (ZG 26—26th Destroyer Wing), Zerstörergeschwader 76 (ZG 76—76th Destroyer Wing), JG 26, JG 51, JG 2 and I.(J) Gruppe of Lehrgeschwader 1 (LG 1—1st Demonstration Wing) were responsible for the RAF aircraft lost in fighter-versus-fighter combat. The remainder have been credited to German bomber units.

The transfer to forward airfields were not smooth. Supplies were few as logistics stretched. JG 27 took to impounding every Bf 109 that landed from other units, syphoning fuel to keep its units operational. Near Brussels on the 16th, 85 Squadron and 1./JG 27 clashed with each side losing two fighters. On 19 May, JG 27 were involved in large battles over Lille. II./JG 27 encountered 87 Squadron, and lost at least one Bf 109 to No. 213 Squadron RAF protecting bombers from Kampfgeschwader 54 (KG 54—54th Bomber Wing). 145 Squadron clashed with 3./JG 27, Gerhard Homuth claimed a victory. I./JG 27 and III./ZG 26 could not prevent RAF fighters claimed three of the KG 54 bombers they were escorting that day. RAF communications broke down necessitating the use of Westland Lysander, No. 26 Squadron RAF, to ferry messages to other bases. One such aircraft was shot down by II./JG 27. Logistics were stretched and communications were in a parlous state. I./JG 21, attached to JG 27, reported 30 Bf 109s available on 23 May, just three days after German spearheads reached the Channel. JG 27 moved into bases around the Pas de Calais. Kleist reported heavy RAF activity as the Germans besieged Calais and fought the Battle of Boulogne. JG 27 came into contact with RAF Fighter Command's No. 11 Group RAF. The battles over these ports from 21 May cost JG 27, then attached to Jagdfliegerführer 2, 10 Bf 109s; the British lost six. Ibel lost I./JG 21 and I./JG 1 to other geschwader. To compensate II./JG 27 was brought down from the north to support I./JG 27. II. Gruppe had claimed 14 enemy aircraft over the Netherlands, mainly near Rotterdam in for first 72 hours. In the Battle of Dunkirk, the last port in Allied hands, JG 27 claimed seven RAF fighters on 2 June 1940. II./JG 2 claimed one, II./JG 26 six, III./JG 26 four, and I./JG 51 one. Fighter Command's total losses were 10 fighters destroyed and one damaged. Stab and I. Gruppe operated over Dunkirk until the end of the battle, claiming 22 enemy aircraft for one loss.

After the Dunkirk failure, in which the British Expeditionary Force was evacuated to England along with large numbers of French soldiers, JG 27 was redeployed to support the final phase of the French campaign, Fall Gelb. Before the offensive began on 5 June, JG 27 was peripherally involved in Operation Paula, an air offensive against airfields and factories in the Paris area. On the first day of the offensive, I./JG 27 claimed seven French fighters north of Paris of one loss; the pilot entering temporary captivity. I. and II./JG 27 claimed another seven between them the following day. On 9 June I./JG 27 claimed another five while II./JG 27 claimed four in their last major action with the French. The success came at the price of six Bf 109s and two pilots killed. They were the first II. Gruppe fatalities of the war. For the remainder of the campaign JG 27 claimed 12 more, but most missions were patrols or close air support flights. I. and II./JG 27 supported the advance to the Loire until the Armistice of 22 June 1940 ended the battle in France with a general cease-fire declared on 25 June.

=== Battle of Britain ===
Hitler failed to bring the British Empire to terms after the fall of France. The decision was taken to invade the United Kingdom, codenamed Operation Sea Lion. A prelude to this undertaking required air superiority over the Channel and Southern England. The OKL began tentative steps to organise Luftlfotte 2 and Luftflotte 3 for an aerial offensive to destroy RAF Fighter Command. I. and II./JG 27 returned to Germany to rest and refit for a brief time. JG 27 were reassigned to VIII. Fliegerkorps at the outset of the Battle of Britain. II./JG 27 was based at Leeuwarden, before moving to Crépon, while III./JG 27 based at Carquebut. I. Gruppe moved to Plumetot. The Luftwaffe began the first phase of the battle by attacking convoys passing through the English Channel, to draw Fighter Command out and deplete its strength as well as closing the Channel to shipping and deny the Royal Navy the chance of interfering with an invasion fleet. The German airmen referred to this period as the Kanalkampf (Channel struggle).

On 4 July 1940, III./JG 27 flew fighter escort for Ju 87s in an attack on Convoy OA 178. On 7 July, 70 Bf 109s from JG 27 protected 45 Do 17s belonging to I. and II. Gruppe of Kampfgeschwader 2 (KG 2—2nd Bomber Wing) as they bombed convoys. 64 Squadron intercepted but lost three Spitfires. Eight days later, twenty-four hours after the opening of the battle through a KG 2 attack on a convoy, III./JG 27 accounted for the first claims in a series of patrols which killed a 609 and 501 pilot. Eight days later, two Hurricanes 43 Squadron were lost, with one pilot killed and the following day 152, 236, 238 and 501 lost aircraft in combat with elements of JG 27. The battle of 20 July occurred when JG 27 was called to provide escorts for bombers attack "Convoy Bosom". I./JG 27 sent around 50 Bf 109s fighter escorts and a few Bf 110s, with Bf 109s from I. and II./JG 51 in support. The most notable German loss this day was Hauptmann Riegel, commanding officer of I./JG 27. Among the successful RAF pilots was James "Ginger" Lacey shot down two Bf 109s. On day 21, a 43 Squadron pilot was killed in a collision with a JG 27-flown Bf 109. JG 27 were engaged in protecting bombers from further attacks against "Bosom". 601 Squadron were known to have lost a pilot to JG 27 on 26 July. The peak of the Kanalkampf occurred on 8 August as the Luftwaffe tried to destroy "Convoy Peewit". The battles over the convoy cost JG 27 nine Bf 109s, with three damaged. 145 and 238 Squadrons were responsible for three apiece. 257 Squadron downed two of their Bf 109s but lost three pilots killed in return. Four pilots were reported killed or missing, but four were saved by Heinkel He 59 floatplanes. II. Gruppe commanding officer Walter Andres was among the survivors. It was costliest single day of the battle for JG 27. Acting as cover for withdrawing bombers on 11 August, JG 27 were involved in combat against 238 and 145 Squadrons again. JG 27 lost three of its number but the German fighters destroyed four 238 Hurricanes and killed four pilots while damaging another. 145 suffered two damaged and two destroyed; two pilots were killed. JG 27 claimed 13 victories, but the day severely depleted the gruppen.

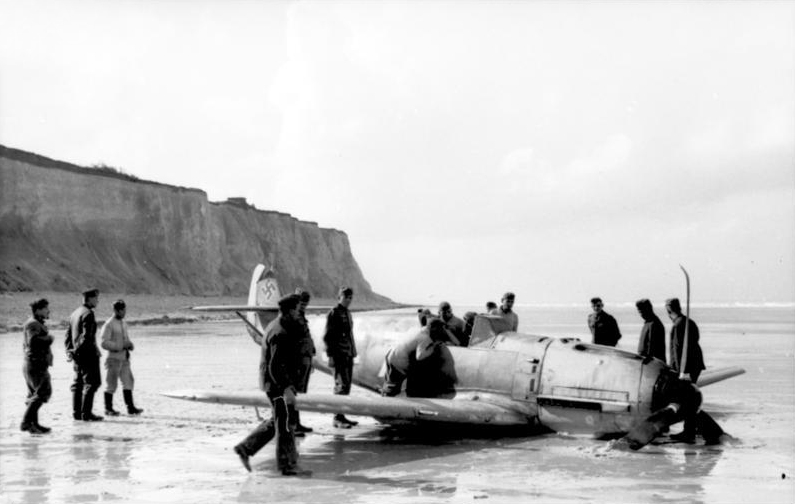
Bf 109 E-7; W.Nr. 4091, 28 September 1940. This fighter was crashed by future JG 27 member, Hans-Joachim Marseille.

On 13 August 1940, the Luftwaffe began Operation Eagle Attack on Fighter Command airfields and supporting structures. JG 27 formed part of the 173-strong Bf 109 force (with support from JG 53 and JG 3) that flew combat patrols from dawn, ahead of the German bomber formations. Later, Zerstörergeschwader 2 (ZG 2—2nd Destroyer Wing) and JG 27 escorted Junkers Ju 88s from LG 1 and Ju 87s from StG 77 over England. No JG 27 losses are recorded. JG 27 submitted five claims. The next major action occurred on 15 August, known as "Black Thursday" in the Luftwaffe, and "The Greatest Day" to the British, due to the scale of the losses. German forces from Norway and Denmark attacked northern England and took heavy losses. JG 27 escorted Ju 87s from I. Gruppe of Sturzkampfgeschwader 1 (StG 1—1st Dive Bomber Wing) and II./StG 2 to Portland, where 18 Hurricanes from 87 and 213 Squadron flying from RAF Exeter engaged them. Two 87 Squadron pilots were killed and two wounded. Squadron Leader T G Lovell-Gregg was killed. The Luftwaffe kept up the pressure the following day. One I. Gruppe aircraft was damaged and two more from II./JG 27 collided killing one pilot while the other was rescued. The Hardest Day 18 August was another series of large-scale air battles and losses for either side. JG 27 lost six Bf 109s (three each from I. and II./JG 27) in action against No. 85 Squadron RAF. Three pilots were killed, two were posted missing presumed dead and the other was picked up in the Channel by a He 59 air-sea rescue aircraft. JG 27 committed 70 Bf 109s to an escort a series of Ju 87 dive-bomber operations. Spitfires from No. 234 Squadron RAF engaged the 25-strong Bf 109 escort commanded by Hauptmann Karl-Wolfgang Redlich. I./JG 27s commander, Eduard Neumann heard the battle developing, but communications were poor and he decided to let Redlich, one of his most experienced Staffelkapitän (Squadron Leaders) fight alone. In the resulting combat, three Bf 109s were shot down. II./JG 27 were positioned too far away to help their charges, Ju 87s from StG 77. III./JG 27 claimed four Spitfires from 602 Squadron destroyed. Spitfires from No. 234 and Hurricanes from 213 Squadron each destroyed one Bf 109. The running air battles had cost the Ju 87 units heavily. The lack of protection for I./StG 77 had cost it 10 Ju 87s with one damaged beyond repair. II./StG 77 lost three Ju 87s to fighter attack and one damaged beyond repair, five crewmen dead and one captured. III./StG 77 also lost two Ju 87s and two damaged with four men killed. The Bf 109s of JG 27 lost six fighters. Two pilots were saved. Another source gives eight Bf 109s destroyed. JG 27 claimed 14 victories, a probable an exaggeration. Only seven were allowed to stand by the Luftwaffe.

JG 27 suffered no known combat losses from 19 August through to 25 August. The following day was another day of heavy aerial fighting and III./JG 27 reported a Bf 109 missing from a sortie over England. On 28 August three Bf 109s were reported damaged in accidents, and a Gotha Go 145 from Stab/JG 27 got lost while flying from Cherbourg to Germany and landed on Lewes racecourse; the pilot was captured. On 30 August five of the wing's aircraft were shot down and another damaged. No. 253 Squadron RAF were responsible for most, while No. 616 Squadron RAF accounted for another in the vicinity of Maidstone. In the first days of September, JG 27 reported no loss until a 5./JG 27 machine was destroyed in combat with 43 Squadron on 5 September while the following day six fighters were destroyed and three damaged. III./JG 27 lost their commanding officer Joachim Schlichting who was posted missing in action. Their opponents were mostly from No. 303 Squadron RAF. Schlichting was one of 22 JG 27 pilots captured.

In September JG 27s gruppen moved to Fiennes, Pas-de-Calais, and then on 24 September to Saint-Inglevert Airfield. At Fiennes on a clear day it is said that the British could observe Bf 109s taking off and landing. One notable change was Wolfgang Lippert, who took command of II./JG 27 on 4 September. The month started successfully. On the first day II./JG 27 claimed seven Spitfires over Kent without loss. The 7 September 1940 saw the OKL change the emphasis from bombing airfields to attacking Greater London, beginning The Blitz. The air raids took Fighter Command by surprise and reduced Luftwaffe losses. JG 27 were in action on this date for I. Gruppe reported one loss over London. At the conclusion of the days fighting, Stab and I. Gruppe reported four and 27 Bf 109s on strength respectively with one and six of them unserviceable at Étaples. At Montreuil, Pas-de-Calais. II./JG 27 reported four of its 33 Bf 109s non-operational while III./JG 27 at Sempy had all but four of its 27 combat ready. The Battle of Britain Day was the climax of the day fighting in the Battle of Britain. JG 27 flew and fought and during its course suffered two casualties, one possibly against No. 19 Squadron RAF. JG 27 claimed only one British fighter that day. The days missions were spent escorting bombers from Kampfgeschwader 76 (KG 76—76th Bomber Wing). Daylight operations continued on 17 September. Eduard Neumann, JG 27 future commanding officer, claimed two Hurricanes from 607 Squadron near Gatwick. Fighter Command records confirm only one loss. The following morning 1./JG 27 suffered one killed and one damaged, the first to an accident. 2. Staffel reported one loss and 9. Staffel reported two missing over London in action with 41 Squadron which suffered no loss. The next day cost 9./JG 27 another pilot in action with 92 Squadron, though the British lost two pilots killed in action with Bf 109s. On a mission over London a week later, 3./JG 27 lost two Bf 109s destroyed and one damaged in action with 19 and 222 Squadron. Two pilots were killed and one rescued. The battle cost 19 Squadron five Spitfires, two pilots killed and two wounded. 222 Squadron lost one pilot killed. On the last day of September, five of the wing's Bf 109s were destroyed and three heavily damaged. Their opponents were from 41, 92 and 303 Squadron. 41 Squadron lost one fighter and another damaged, while 92 also suffered damage to one Spitfire. II. and III. Gruppen claimed six between them. The month had cost JG 27 29 Bf 109s.

By October 1940 the Luftwaffe had lost its strategic purpose. German tactics changed through the month but achieved little military gain. On 7 October, 5. and 9./JG 27 carrying bombs attacked targets in southern England. Four were shot down, two from each unit. Their assailants from 606 and 501 suffered one pilot killed in the latter unit. On day 11 One pilot was rescued after being shot down by 41 Squadron's Eric Lock, and single losses were reported on the 15th and 22nd. The Blitz and ensuing fighter sweeps over England in the last few months of 1940 could not dent British defences or ultimately the country's war effort. I. Gruppe was removed from the Channel area on 1 October, having lost 26 Bf 109s and 19 pilots since July. III./JG 27 commanded by Max Dobislav, who succeeded Schlichting after his capture on 7 September, left their base at Guînes on 10 November. The Gruppe were based at Guînes throughout September and had lost two pilots captured and one missing in the final month; they claimed five enemy aircraft. The two captured men were the only Staffelkapitäne lost by JG 27 in the battle. One day after the official end to the Battle of Britain, Lippert achieved arguably the most notable victory of the wing when he shot down the leading RAF ace Archie McKellar. III./JG 27 moved to Vechta in Germany, while Detmold. I./JG 27 was dispatched to Dinan in northwestern France on 21 October, after resting at Stade near Hamburg from 1 October. On 4 December the captured Schlichting was awarded the Knight's Cross for his success in protecting bomber formations at the expense of achieving personal victories.

=== Balkans and Eastern Front ===
The three gruppen of JG 27 were all returned to Germany in the winter 1940/41. The entire geschwader remained inert until April 1941. I. Gruppe were stationed at Graz-Thalerhof under Fliegerführer Graz, II. Gruppe transferred to Bucharest and then Vrba. III. Gruppe moved through those bases but were at Belica/Sofia in early April. The latter gruppen were placed in Richthofen's VIII. Fliegerkorps, separate from I./JG 27 which came under the control of Luftflotte 4. JG 27 formed part of the Luftwaffe fighter force for the German invasion of Yugoslavia and simultaneous attack on Greece.

On 6 April, 3./JG 27 opened their campaign by strafing hangars at Ljubljana airfield. During the mission an unknown Oberfähnrich pilot Hans-Joachim Marseille was hit by anti-aircraft artillery but returned to Graz. The action was the only noteworthy contribution to the invasion in the north. Over the Rupel Pass in the south, 8./JG 27 ran into a Hurricane squadron led by Pat Pattle, probably the leading Western Allied fighter pilot of the war who may have accounted for one JG 27 pilot killed. RAF Blenheims were active attacking German army units from dawn. Over Lake Prespa, No. 211 Squadron RAF Blenheims were intercepted by 6./JG 27 and led by Hans-Joachim Gerlach. In a short engagement, all six were shot down and only two men survived. Gerlach was shot down and captured attacking airfields on 14 April. He was the only gruppe casualty in Greece. The following day six fighters from the 24 Mira, Hellenic Air Force were claimed over Kalambaka. A strafing attack at Niamata by II./JG 27 disabled several No. 113 Squadron RAF Blenheims.

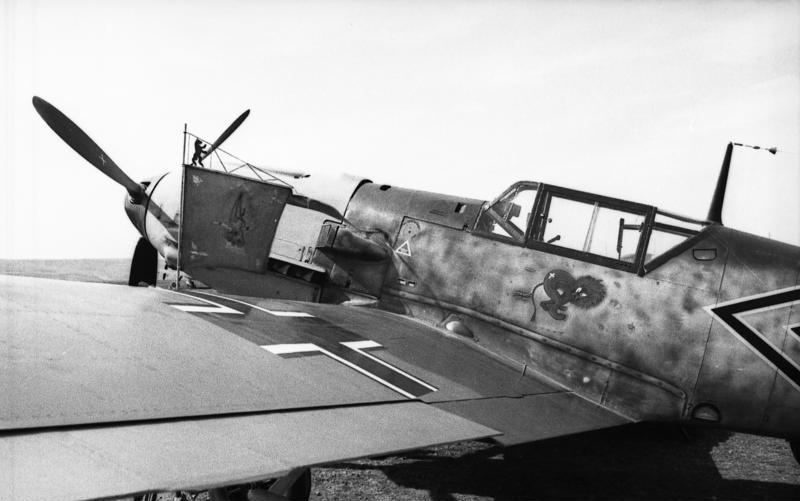
Bf 109 of Stab, II./JG 27 in the Balkans, 1941

Retreating British Commonwealth forces retreating across the Thessalian plain were dive-bombed by 40 Ju 87s from StG 2 and Sturzkampfgeschwader 3 (StG 3—3rd Dive Bomber Wing) on 19 April. Pattle's No. 80 Squadron RAF attacked the Ju 87s and destroyed two before II./JG 27 could intervene. In the air battle that followed, the Bf 109s damaged one Hurricane for no loss. On 20 April Geschwaderkommodore Wolfgang Schellmann, Ibel's principal successor, led Stab/JG 27 over Khalkis harbour to support the bombing of Allied ships evacuating Greece. He personally accounted for one 80 Squadron Hurricane and another badly damaged. II./JG 27 strafed Eleusis airfield, destroying the remaining Greek fighters, along with two No. 33 Squadron RAF Hurricanes, and a petrol bowser for the cost of one pilot captured. II./JG 27 was involved in the "Battle of Athens", Gustav Rödel claiming three during the days intensive air fighting. Stab and II. Gruppe lost a pilot each on 22 April before the battle on the Greek mainland ended on 30 April.

Stab, II. and III./JG 27 stayed with VIII. Fliegerkorps and were subordinated to Kesselring's Luftflotte 2 in June 1941. The two gruppen were still equipped with the Bf 109 E and based at Subolevo. They formed the core of the fighter force in the air corps with II. Gruppe of Jagdgeschwader 52 (JG 52—52nd Fighter Wing). The geschwader was tasked with supporting Operation Barbarossa, the invasion of the Soviet Union which began the war on the Eastern Front.

On the opening day, 22 June, II./JG 27 escorted StG 2 against the Alytus aerodrome. Wolfgang Schellmann led Stab/JG 27 into combat but was forced to bail out over Soviet lines and was never heard from again. He was the only JG 27 commanding officer killed in action. The Western Front ordered aerial counter-attacks against Army Group Centre. Waves of unescorted bombers were sent against German forces. 27 Ilyushin DB-3 bombers of the 53 BAP were sent to attack German forces at Grodno on 24 June. They were intercepted by II./JG 27 and nine were shot down; nine to the Bf 109s. The next day all three JG 27 units moved to Vilnius and found 56 aircraft wrecks from the 57 SAD. Once again, large numbers of unescorted Soviet bombers tried to bomb the airfield but JG 27 and JG 53 repulsed them. 53 DB-3 and Tupolev SBs were destroyed at the cost of one Bf 109. Leutnant Gustav Langanke accounted for seven. There were Soviet success; on 29 June nine Soviet DB-3s managed to attack Vilnius and destroy 10 aircraft, belonging to both ZG 26 and JG 27. The action left II./JG 27 with only 10 serviceable Bf 109s and the decision was taken to remove it from the Eastern Front after only seven days. The remaining Bf 109s were given to III./JG 27.

III./JG 27 fought in the Battle of Smolensk in July, and encountered the new Petlyakov Pe-2 bomber when it engaged 411 BAP/OSNAZ. The group claimed two. On 20 August Richthofen moved strike and fighter aircraft to Spasskaya Polist, 40 km north-east of Novgorod to support the drive to Leningrad. III./JG 27 and II./JG 53 followed to the new bases. Experienced pilots now emerged as flying ace on the Eastern Front. Erbo Graf von Kageneck claimed 14 Soviet aircraft in August 1941, the second-highest of the month. On 25 September JG 27 lost the 29-victory ace Franz Blazytko killed in combat with Polikarpov I-16s. Two days later the gruppe provided six Ju 52 transport groups with air cover reinforcing Lyuban. Soviet fight units attempted to intercept but did not achieve success. In late September the Escuadrilla Azul ("Blue Squadron") was created as 15. Staffel (Span) in JG 27 made of Spanish volunteers. The Spanish pilots claimed 160 aircraft destroyed until October 1943, for the loss of 20 killed. III. Gruppe deployed to support Army Group Centre's southwest thrust against Moscow. Erbo Graf von Kageneck, the wing's most successful pilot in the Soviet Union, achieved the last victory for JG 27 on 12 October 1941 and his personal tally stood at 65. He was the first member of the geschwader to receive the Knight's Cross with Oak Leaves. Stab and III./JG 27 returned to Germany to equip with the Bf 109 F and then moved to North Africa to reunite with the rest of JG 27. The German units returned to Döberitz and left 15.(Span)/JG 27 behind. The Spanish were later attached to JG 51 and JG 52.

=== North Africa and Mediterranean ===
On 10 June 1940 Benito Mussolini brought the Italian Empire into the war on Germany's side. Mussolini hoped to capitalise on the rapid fall of France by entering the conflict before its conclusion and receiving a share of the territorial gains. The Italian invasion of France ended with a German victory in Fall Rot. The second land offensive occurred in September 1940 with the Italian Invasion of Egypt, and in October with the Greco-Italian War. The campaigns failed, compelling German support in Africa and Greece. The Axis powers were swift to achieve victory in Greece. Hitler sent the Deutsches Afrika Korps to Italian Libya in March 1941 to forestall an Italian collapse in the wake of Operation Compass. Operation Sonnenblume succeeded in stabilising the Axis position in North Africa. The Luftwaffe sent Messerschmitt Bf 110 heavy fighters from III./ZG 26 to support the Italian African Army from January 1941. The unit claimed its first success on 19 February. JG 27 arrived in April, in the form of I. Gruppe under the command of Eduard Neumann. The gruppe arrived at Gazala on 14 April, and first engaged in combat five days later. Karl-Wolfgang Redlich and Werner Schröer claimed the first victories in Africa, but Schröer had the distinction of being the first German Bf 109 pilot shot down in Africa. The first day of combat operations yielded four claims for one loss. JG 27 soon moved to airbases in the vicinity of Tobruk to support the Siege of Tobruk. From 21 to 21 April the Desert Air Force had the best of fighting. The bombers assisted in breaking up several of Rommel's early tank attacks.

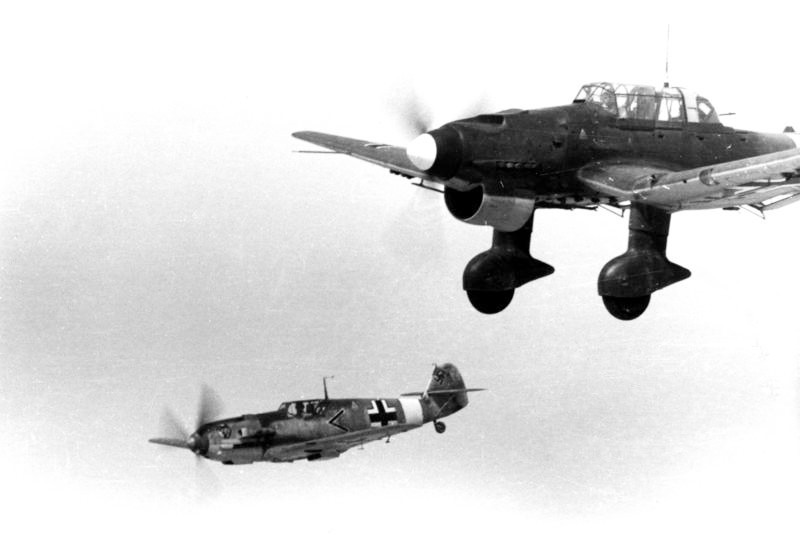
I./JG 27 Bf 109 escorts Ju 87 of StG 2, 1941. The emblem of I. Gruppe is on the cowling. The Bf 109 is probably from the Stabschwarm ("staff swarm")

The situation rapidly deteriorated for the RAF in mid-April. Air Commodore Raymond Collishaw, commanding 204 Group RAF (renamed the Desert Air Force), wrote to Air Marshal Arthur Tedder on 24 April. The arrival of JG 27 and ZG 26 near Tobruk allowed the German formations to arrive at great height within ten minutes of an air raid warning, leaving British fighters at lower altitude and a great disadvantage. He remarked attrition had caused "a serious reduction in our fighter force." Air Marshal Arthur Longmore cabled the Air Ministry in London. He told London that to maintain patrols, the fighters were forced to refuel at Sidi Barrani granting Axis air units a free hand over Tobruk but arguing that without patrols to defend fighter squadrons refuelling at Tobruk on the ground, they were "hostage to a fortune we cannot afford." On 1 May, for example, No. 274 Squadron RAF lost all six Hurricanes it sent on a single mission when a flight of Bf 109s from JG 27 led by Gerhard Homuth, and containing the most successful fighter pilot in Africa, Hans-Joachim Marseille, engaged them from a superior altitude over Tobruk. JG 27 opposed the aerial element of Operation Brevity. The operation was called off within 48 hours after strong German resistance. JG 27 accounted for four British aircraft, one of them was piloted by Noel Agazarian who was killed. The Tobruk defenders were hard-pressed against Luftwaffe fighter operations and on 21 May; 73, 213 and 274 Squadrons were their main units. Joachim Müncheberg arrived with 7./JG 26 on 1 June to assist JG 27. In the build-up to Operation Battleaxe, RAF bombers attacked airfields at Gazala. I./JG 27 were forced to decamp personnel to the beach, and pitch camps between the dunes. 2 staffel Hans-Arnold Stahlschmidt may have sunk a 200-ton sailing ship, the eight crew washed up in German territory and were captured. In early June, pilots were pressing for the arrival of the Bf 109 F. The Bf 109 E, which the Hurricane could match under some circumstances, was grossly inferior to the newer Bf 109. On the eve of Battleaxe, the Luftwaffe could muster 7./JG 26, I./JG 27, several staffeln from LG 1, two gruppen of Ju 87s from StG 1 StG 3. At the beginning of the battle another well-known and long-serving pilot began to achieve success; Ludwig Franzisket, future Geschwaderkommodore. Twenty-four British aircraft were shot down and three badly damaged in the brief fighting. JG 27 lost two pilots killed. The 17 June was particularly successful; eight Hurricanes were shot down. Over the next weeks, a stalemate developed with the Luftwaffe attempting to bomb Tobruk into surrender by destroying seaborne supplies. JG 27 fought virtually daily battles with the RAF, RAAF and South African Air Force Commonwealth forces for control of the skies until September 1941.

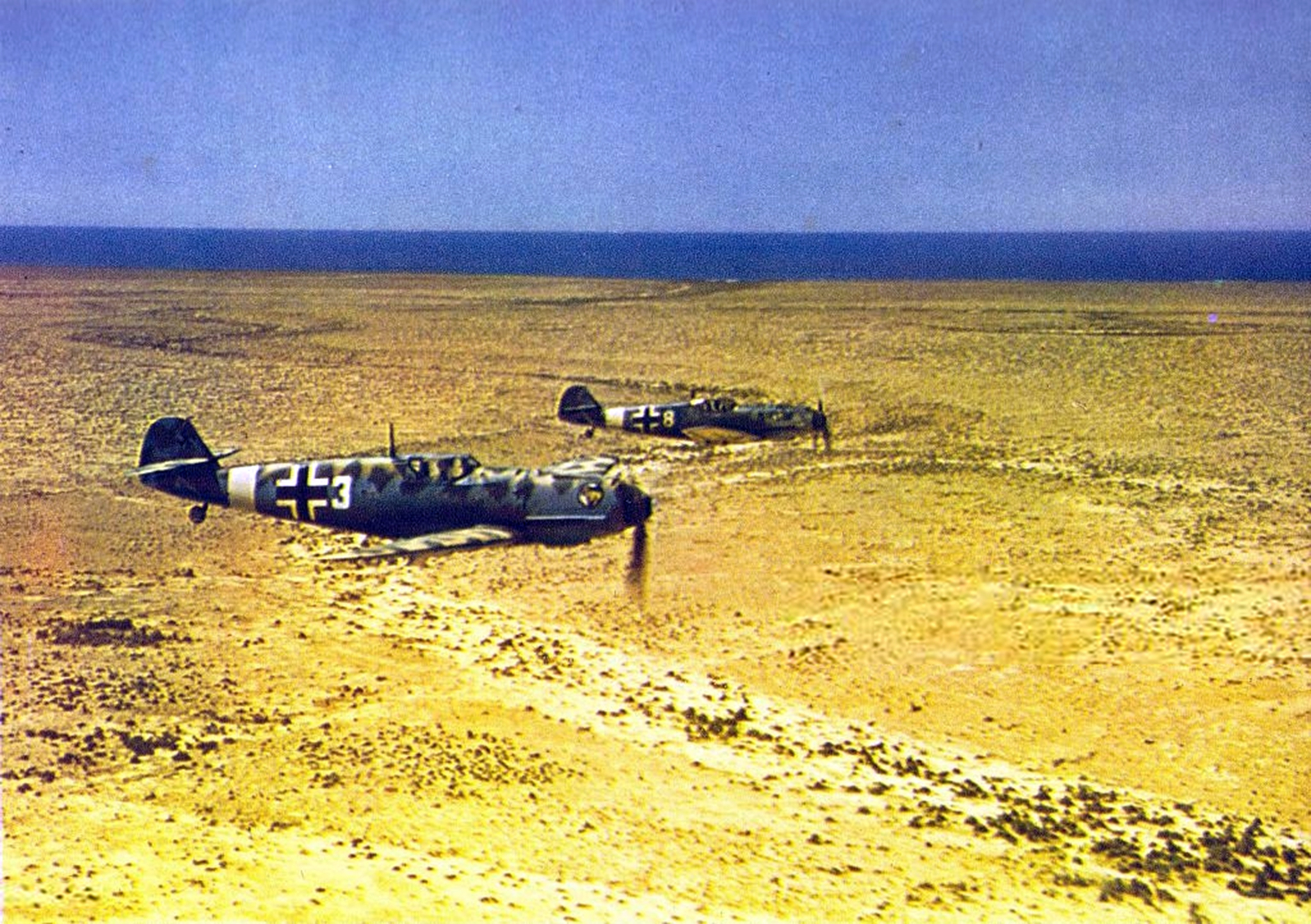
JG 27 Bf 109s over Italian Libya, 1941. The Bf 109 nearest the camera carries the emblem of I. Gruppe

On 14 September II./JG 27 arrived in Africa. The unit comprised three Staffeln which had claimed 75 victories over France in 1940, 60 in the Battle of Britain, 17 in Greece and 39 in ten days in the Soviet Union. They were led by the experienced Wolfgang Lippert. Among the squadron leaders were Gustav Rödel, Ernst Düllberg. The pilot contingent contained Otto Schulz and a number of other airmen who had claimed five to 19 aerial victories. On 18 November 1941, the British Eighth Army began Operation Crusader which lifted the siege of Tobruk. JG 27 was in the process of converting to Bf 109 Fs and on the eve of the offensive I./JG 27 could muster a single staffel. II./JG 27 had only three staffeln. A fighter-bomber staffel (10./JG 27) was attached. Aside from III./ZG 26 with three Bf 110 staffeln, JG 27 was the only fighter unit available. On 19 November, Rödel found a column of armoured units moving toward Tobruk and reported it. Neumann did not believe the report and took off himself to see. Once found, he started his stopwatch at the head of the column and ten minutes passed before he reached the end of it. All available Axis aircraft were ordered to attack the column, which turned back. The British advance did not falter. On 21 November the garrison broke out heading for Ed Duda while Sidi Rezegh fell. The following day heavy air fighting took place. In a notable action I./JG 27 sent 15-20 Bf 109s to engage No. 3 Squadron RAAF Curtiss P-40s and Blenheims from No. 45 Squadron; three of the former and four of the Blenheims were shot down. Commanding officer of II./JG 27, Wolfgang Lippert was shot down and captured but died of his wounds in hospital. Sidi Rezegh was back in German hands on 30 November, once again isolating Tobruk. On 3 December Rommel sent scouting forces into Egypt but they were repulsed with heavy losses. At this time, the Luftwaffe was suffering from chronic fuel shortages and was not able to send large forces into combat. The 5 December was a bad day for the Ju 87 units which suffered heavy casualties; JG 27 succeeded in inflicting heavy losses to No. 250 Squadron RAF and accounted for seven Allied fighters. On 8 December, British forces made contact with the garrison again, and on 9th Rommel began to withdraw. III./JG 53 was rushed to Africa to reinforce JG 27. On 24 December 1941, JG 27 could muster just six operational Bf 109s between all three gruppen. The lack of fuel and loss of ground crews in the retreat contributed to its decline. That same day, another of the top-scoring JG 27 pilots was shot down. Erbo Graf von Kageneck was grievously wounded and died in Italy the following month. At the time of his death he was the wing's leading fighter pilot. Stab and III./JG 27 arrived from the Soviet Union early in the month and I./JG 27 had returned from Germany after re-fitting. Even so, on 16 January 1942 Stab had three Bf 109s (two combat ready), I. Gruppe six from 23, II. Gruppe 7 from 25, and III. Gruppe three from 19.

Technically, the Luftwaffe held the advantage in Africa. When Bf 109s from JG 27 first appeared over Libya, senior RAF commanders called for Spitfires to be sent to the region immediately. The Bf 109 E proved to be all the Hurricane could handle, but the appearance of the Bf 109 F made the requests more urgent for this type exposed the inferiority of the Hurricane's general performance. British fears of a Soviet collapse had faded by the end of 1941. The Battle of Britain would not be resumed, and Fighter Command began to send Spitfire squadrons to Malta in March, then to Africa in mid-1942. Until the Spitfires arrival, the Desert Air Force relied on the Curtiss P-40 Warhawk in the air superiority role. The Allied air forces built an enormously efficient support facility in Egypt for maintenance and repair which the Luftwaffe did little to disturb. Conversely, the Italian supply system was poor. The German supply situation was consistently stretched in 1942. Throughout the desert war, the Germans were short of manpower and materiel. German fighter pilots remained in battle, and those that showed an aptitude for aerial combat were sent to where the fighting was heaviest with the best available equipment for the job. They always flew in preference to newer pilots who were not relied upon to achieve results. The Luftwaffe could ill-afford to keep its best men out of action because of the numerical disadvantage it suffered over Africa. The experten ("experts") were rarely rested, unless wounded, and flew more often. Those that lived were able to build vast amounts of experience and consequently the top-rated German pilots tended to claim far more aerial victory totals than Allied airmen. In mid-1942, Werner Schröer remarked that in the desert during June 1942, methods for detecting an enemy attack were primitive. There was no radar, so a pair of Bf 109s on patrol and a Fieseler Fi 156 Storch scouting aircraft had to be used to spot danger. Missions varied from protecting coastal shipping to their own bases. According to Schröer, these types of defensive tactics put the Germans at an altitude disadvantage.

In early 1942, Hans-Joachim Marseille surpassed the achievements of Lippert and von Kageneck. In February 1942 he was awarded the Knight's Cross and continued to claim multiple victories through to May when Rommel prepared to resume the offensive. During the month JG 27 claimed 52 British Commonwealth aircraft; Marseille claimed 16. The front had been static until May 1942, and by the 10th JG 27 exactly 100 Bf 109s in three groups. JG 53 had been withdrawn and two staffeln of ZG 76 remained to support them. On 20 May, III./JG 53 returned to Martuba. Rödel took command of II./JG 27 when Erich Gerlitz was moved to command the JG 53 contingent. Air fighting escalated from 22 May as each side sought to gain air superiority. On 23 May an interception by JG 27 against No. 223 Squadron RAF ended in the unescorted British bomber unit being destroyed. II./JG 27 carried out the bulk of the combat and heavy claims were made which have proven difficult to verify. Two days later, the Battle of Gazala began. JG 27 and the supporting III./JG 53, which reinforced the German fighter force through the battle, were able to exact a heavy toll of British aircraft. On 31 May 1942 they shot down 16; from 29 to 31 May, 39 were reported lost by the British Commonwealth air forces. While the top-rated fighter pilots, Marseille, Homuth, Schultz, Stahlschmidt claimed high numbers of aircraft during mid-1942, the vast majority were fighters. This has led some analysts to question the military effectiveness of German fighter units which left British bombers untouched to wreak havoc on Axis ground forces and supply lines. On 6 June 1942, for example, British fighter-bombers destroyed 70 vehicles. The "tankbuster" Hawker Hurricanes of No. 6 Squadron RAF alone flew 37 sorties from 10 to 16 June and claimed 31 German tanks and large numbers of vehicles. JG 27 claimed 136 aircraft from 26 May–21 June 1942, nearly all of them fighters. On 22 June, III./JG 53 and III./JG 27 moved forward to Gambut.

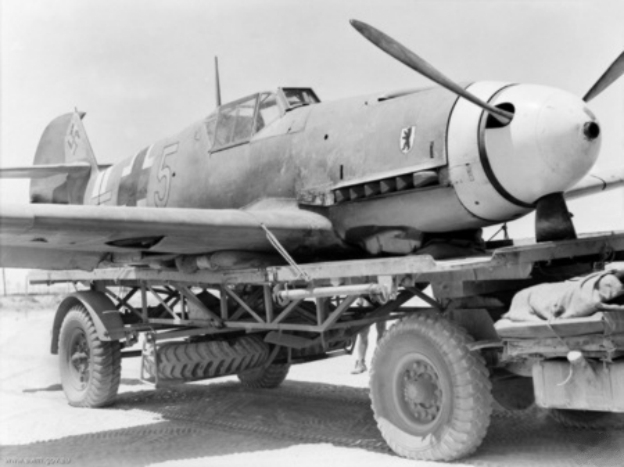
Captured Bf 109 F/Trop at Alamien, late 1942. "Yellow 5" has the II. Gruppe emblem on the cowling

Neumman took command of JG 27 on 8 June from Bernhard Woldenga, and Homuth replaced Neumman in command of I./JG 27. On the 9th, JG 27 was involved in large-scale fighter escort duties for Stukas in the Battle of Bir Hakeim. Marseille left Africa two days later to receive the Swords to the Knight's Cross with Oak Leaves for achieving 100 victories. On 21 June Rommel captured Tobruk. The battle was marked by the loss of the 51-victory ace Otto Schulz, killed in combat with the Canadian pilot James Francis Edwards on 17 June. Rommel attempted to exploit the victory in the First Battle of El Alamein, and break into middle Egypt to capture Alexandria and Cairo. Four days into the battle JG 27 lost another fight leader, Friedrich Körner, captured on the fourth day of the battle, which ended on the 27th in German defeat; air fighting had subsided by 28 July. In Marseille's absence, Stahlschmidt led the successes table with 24 Allied aircraft claimed in July 1942. In July 1942 JG 27 claimed 149 Allied aircraft in combat. Only a single one was a bomber, and two were transports. The remainder were fighters. In August 1942 JG 27 pilots claimed 102 aircraft; just two were bombers. On 19 August Stab/JG 27 and II. Gruppe were based at Sanyet El Qotaifiya, I. Gruppe at Turbiya, and III. Gruppe at Haggag Qasaba with 2, 24, 23 and 24 Bf 109s respectively. The most notable success of JG 27, was the interception and destruction of a Bristol Bombay transport carrying Lieutenant General William Gott. Emil Clade shot it down killing Gott. Winston Churchill had appointed Gott to lead the British Eighth Army that day. Gott was replaced by Bernard Montgomery.

The failure to break through British Commonwealth lines forced Rommel to conserve his strength, and build up his supplies from the distant port of Tobruk. At the end of the month, he attempted a three-pronged attack at the Battle of Alam el Halfa and JG 27 were in action over the battlezones. By the start, Marseille had returned and on 1 September, as the ground battle bogged down, JG 27 experienced one of its most successful days in Africa. JG 27 claimed 26 aircraft destroyed for three losses, one pilot missing, one wounded and one died of wounds (one each from 1., 6. and 7./JG 27). Marseille alone claimed 17. Commonwealth units lost 13 in aerial combat or to unspecified reasons, and 10 damaged. A single P-40 was lost from the recently arrived US 57th Fighter Group. The Regia Aeronautica 23rd, 10th and 9th Gruppo claimed nine between them. The following morning JG 27 claimed 10 Allied fighters for one Bf 109. 13 Allied fighters were shot down and one damaged. Specifically, six were credited to Bf 109s. The Italians claimed eight fighters for three pilots. JG 27 claimed 18 the next day, while the Italians believed they had destroyed seven Allied fighters for certain. Nine were attributed to Bf 109s by the British plus one damaged. The German attack failed, and the battle ended on 5 September. Over the next 48 hours, JG 27 lost two of its most prominent fighter pilots. On 6 September 1942 Günter Steinhausen, a 40-victory ace was killed in combat, followed on 7 September by Hans-Arnold Stahlschmidt, who had claimed 59 British Commonwealth aircraft destroyed, all in North Africa. September proved a costly month, for on the final day, Hans-Joachim Marseille, who had claimed 151 aerial victories in Africa, and whose total of 158 credited victories against the Western Allies would not be surpassed, was killed in a flying accident. Morale sank in JG 27 following the deaths, and shortly afterwards, I./JG 27 was ordered out of Africa.

I./JG 27 located to Pachino, Sicily on 8 October 1942. The gruppe also supported the final air attacks on the besieged island of Malta. Over Malta they claimed seven Spitfires for two Bf 109s and returned to Africa later in the month. Only the two remaining two gruppen, with III./JG 53 remained to oppose the British build-up at Alamien. The Second Battle of El Alamein precipitated the collapse of the Axis front in Egypt and by mid-November 1942 the Afrika Korps was streaming back west into Libya. As the battle drew to a close, the Anglo-American Operation Torch landed in French North Africa (modern day Morocco and Algeria), collapsing the Axis-friendly Vichy French governments there. German reinforcements forestalled the American advance into Tunisia, beginning the Tunisian Campaign with the Axis facing American forces to the west and British to the east, culminating in the destruction of the remaining Axis forces in North Africa (Panzer Army Africa) on 13 May 1943. JG 27 did not remain long enough to oversee the final defeat, and most staffeln left Africa by 12 November. On that day Neumman left with the Stabschwarm in a Dornier Do 17. Elements of II./JG 27 lingered until December. I. Gruppe went to Germany, the bulk of III. Gruppe retired to Crete and Greece for a short period. All combat units moved to Berca Airfield, until ready to depart. Bf 109s were handed to Jagdgeschwader 77 (JG 77—77th Fighter Wing).

JG 27 fought in action from 23 October through to 9 November 1942, claiming successes and reporting casualties; 50 British Commonwealth aircraft were claimed to 9 November. JG 27 retreated into Libya. On 6 December 1942, Leutnant Hans Lewes, 6./JG 27, claimed the last aerial victory of JG 27 in Africa. All personnel began leaving between 12 and 18 December. The ground-crews were purportedly delighted at leaving and departed for Tripoli on 12 December. JG 27 claimed 1,166 Allied aircraft shot down over North Africa by the end of 1942. Claims made throughout the war amounted to 1,799. Stab/JG 27 claimed 34, I. Gruppe 684, II. Gruppe 558 and III. Gruppe 523. JG 27 losses in North Africa stood at 37 killed in combat (two by ground fire), 25 missing in action (23 in aerial combat), 27 prisoner of war (26 aerial combat) and 24 seriously wounded in action (18 in aerial combat).

=== Air war over Italy, Greece and Yugoslavia ===
I. Gruppe moved to Germany, then to France, and did not return to the Mediterranean. II. and III. Gruppe returned to Germany briefly but returned to Southern Europe late February 1943, rebasing in Sicily. II. Gruppe returned via Vienna on 28 February 1943 to their new bases at Palermo. 4./JG 27 was equipped with the Bf 109 G-6. The gruppe was in action the following morning over Ragusa, Sicily and achieved its first success. The gruppe reported that since their arrival in Sicily, Spitfire strafing and fighter-bomber operations over the island had declined by the end of March 1943. III. Gruppe was known to be operational by 6 April, for the unit suffered its first combat loss of the period in action with No. 126 Squadron RAF. Stab. and II./JG 27 provided fighter escort for convoys sailing between Italy and Tripoli in February 1943 based at Santo Pietro. Neumann's Stabschwarm still operated ageing Bf 109 F-4/Trops (tropicalised versions). These fighter units were expected to support attacks on Malta, which was no longer the besieged island of 1942, and cover convoys. Malta's forces had taken the offensive and were routinely attacking Axis targets in Sicily. On 3 March 1943, for example, 5 staffel engaged and claimed six Spitfires over their own base in Sicily. 7. and 9. Staffel transferred to Bari in March to convert onto the Bf 109 G-2. 5./JG 27 were operating the Bf 109 G-6 at Trapani by March 1943. In combat over an Axis convoy on 3 March, 39-victory ace pilot Rudolf Sinner, II./JG 27, reported the failure of his mission when the largest ship was hit and burned after a low-level attack by American medium bombers. The entire gruppe reassembled at Trapani on 3 April. The personnel set up camp on the slopes of Monte Erice, overlooking the airfield. III./JG 27 moved to San Pietro the same day, though they used Trapani frequently after returning from Crete.

The gruppe claimed six American aircraft on 5 April, countering the first raids of Operation Flax. II./JG 27 experienced the first American attack on its base this day, necessitating the withdrawal of their headquarters several miles from the airfield. In the midst of these activities, Gustav Rödel assumed command of JG 27 on 22 April 1943, replacing Neumann who moved to the staff of the General der Jagdflieger. This very day II./JG 27 reported the loss of 16 Messerschmitt Me 323s it was escorting; analysis confirms 14. JG 27 sources described the air battle as a "massacre." The following morning II./JG 27 landed in Africa for the first time since December 1942. It operated from Tunis during this day, but experienced damage to three Bf 109s which were left behind. The group experienced the dire conditions in Tunisia; incessant bombing attacks, few spares, and an acute fuel shortage. II./JG 27 operated off the coast of Africa during 1943. On 23 March, for example, II./JG 27 fought with I./JG 53 over Ras Jebel against the US 1st Fighter Group. A Lockheed P-38 Lightning was claimed. On 31 March, II./JG 27 scored a success when intercepting North American B-25 Mitchells of the 321st Bombardment Group escorted by P-38s of the US 82nd Fighter Group. A Junkers Ju 88 from III./KG 76 lured the fighters away and the Bf 109s were able to break up the formation, force the American bomber pilots to jettison their bombs, though they lost only two aircraft. II./JG 27 changed missions on 9 April. It was ordered to Sainte Marie du Zit Airfield for two-days operations over the frontline. Wilhelm Kientsch, a 53-victory pilot (killed January 1944) claimed a B-17 Flying Fortress over Trapani. Albert Kesselring, commander-in-chief of the North African and Mediterranean Theatre, was travelling by air to the base and personally offered to be a witness. The B-17s were from the 91st Bombardment Group and 301st Bombardment Group. The Americans reported two losses. On 19 April, II. Gruppe attempted to escort Ju 52s to Africa, but the transports flew too low for evasive movements and in large open formations making it impossible for Bf 109s to cover them all. 15 were shot down. 24 Bf 109s from the gruppe were airborne but claimed no victory. On 29 April 160 Axis fighters covered the convoys over the coast in a desperate bid to keep the flow of supplies getting to Axis forces.

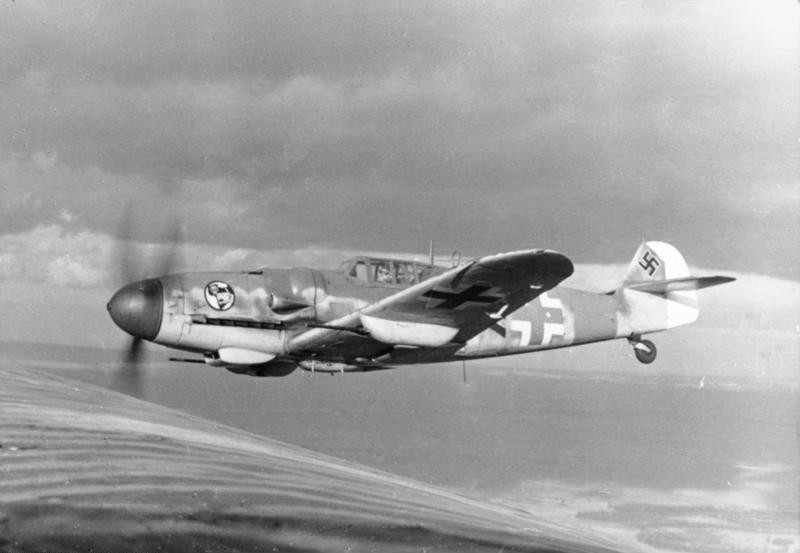
Bf 109 G, JG 27 piloted by Ludwig Franzisket, who went on to command JG 27. The photograph was taken in early 1944

On 5 May 1943, the commanding officer of 7./JG 27, the 41-victory pilot Gunther Hannack, recently transferred from JG 77, was forced down over Malta and captured. The convoy duties cost the two staffeln six Bf 109s, and soon after they moved to Tanagra, northwest of Athens to join 8./JG 27. 5./JG 27 claimed a last victory in support of supply operations on 13 May, the same day Axis forces surrendered at Tunis. The claim, made near Marettimo is unconfirmed. III. Gruppe claimed a first victory in several months, on 6 May over Tunis. The Gruppe was split, with staffeln on Crete—they claimed successes over Aegean on 13 May. II. and III. Gruppen remained in Sicily until the latter moved to Italy mid-month. II. Gruppe remained until the third week in June 1943, before it abandoned Sicily and withdrew to mainland Italy in the face of intensive attacks on their airfields. The Gruppe supported anti-shipping operations; on 10 June it escorted II/SG 2 on such missions. III./JG 27s brief stay on the mainland was spent protecting military targets in Naples and Foggia. Reinforcements increased fighter strength from 190 in mid-May to 450 in early July 1943. Close to 40 percent of all fighter production from 1 May to 15 July 1943 went to the Mediterranean Theatre and two new fighter wings, scheduled for Germany's defence, went south. The movement of fighters to redress Allied air superiority achieved only a rise in German losses, which reflected the superiority of Allied production. From 16 May to 9 July Allied forces flew 42,147 sorties and lost 250 aircraft to the Axis' 325 as the air offensive gradually rendered airfields in Sicily inoperable. On 20 June II. Gruppe moved to Lecce on the heal of Italy. The move brought scant relief, the US Fifteenth Air Force heavy bombers were biting deeper into continental Europe. The gruppe moved San Vito dei Normanni, as bombing rendered Lecce untenable. On 16 July 1943 they fought a last major action over the region; four days after Operation Husky, the Allied invasion of Sicily before leaving the Mediterranean permanently. The pitched battle was against the 376th Bombardment Group and 389th Bombardment Group over Bari. The Germans claimed nine, the Italian 21 Gruppo claimed three. JG 27 reported two pilots killed.

III./JG 27 left Italy in late July to return to Vienna. The gruppe returned to the Mediterranean on 23 September, but located to Argos, near Athens in Greece; it remained engaged in combat operations in this theatre until March 1944. A fourth group was added to JG 27 in June. IV. Gruppe was created in Greece and placed under the command of Hauptmann Rudolf Sinner. This gruppe remained in action over Greece and the Balkans until March 1944. The Allied invasion of Italy, Operation Avalanche had considerable impact on JG 27 gruppen operating in southeast Europe. Allied air forces operating from Italy from September 1943, faced only the barrier of the Adriatic Sea. Allied bombers began to make frequent raids into the Axis-held Balkans until the end of the war. Among the JG 27 pilots to emerge in the air battles over Greece was Heinrich Bartels, drafted from Jagdgeschwader 5 after service in the Arctic Circle. In October 1943, III. Gruppe was left to cover Greece and Crete while IV. Gruppe moved to Podgorica, Yugoslavia. Later in October, elements of III. Gruppe flew combat operations over Corsica, and were based at Viterbo briefly. In combat over Serbia, IV. Gruppe doubled its total but lost their recently appointed commanding officer, the 188-victory ace Joachim Kirschner killed on 17 December. Kirschner was the second of group's commanders to die, after acting commander Dietrich Boesler. JG 27 flew in support of the Dodecanese campaign. There were light Luftwaffe losses during the operation, in which JG 27 flew some 70 sorties and the strike forces flew 134, dropping 110 tons of bombs. III. Gruppe claimed 15 Bristol Beaufighters in the first two weeks, November 1943, but IV. Gruppe was claimed the greatest number of victories and suffer the heaviest losses in the region.

By March 1944 the US Eighth Air Force was threatening to gain air superiority over Germany proper. The battles over the country from January to April 1944 ensured the Luftwaffe lost the air war over the homeland and Western Europe. With I./JG 5, III. and IV. Gruppe were assigned to Jafü Ostmark (Fighter Leader Austria). They were immediately added to Luftflotte Reich order of battle.

=== Defence of the Reich and the Western Front ===
I. Gruppe moved to France after its withdrawal from Africa. It was moved to Jagdfliegerführer 3 at Évreux from 2 January 1943. The formation was ordered to defend the Paris area but was still not at full combat effectiveness, in what was to become a demanding combat environment. The group experienced its first combat on 8 March and five days later its commander Hauptmann Heinrich Setz was killed in action with Spitfires. A series of air raids against Rouen and Rennes took place that day, covered by 16 RAF Squadrons and the US 4th Fighter Group. 3./JG 27 lost one pilot killed in the fighting. The gruppe moved to Jagdfliegerführer Südfrankreich after the Axis defeat in Africa. It stayed at Poix for a week before moving to Southern France after Case Anton to defend the area. 2./JG 27 left Jafü 3 and the rest of I./JG 27 and transferred to Amsterdam-Schiphol Airfield, under the jurisdiction of Jagdfliegerführer Holland for a short time. I. Gruppe was the first formation moved from a peripheral theatre to defend Germany. The unit was then moved to the 7. Jagddivision near Markersdorf, from Münster. It became the first unit under Jagdfliegerführer Ostmark, and was later joined by III. and IV. Gruppe in Austria.

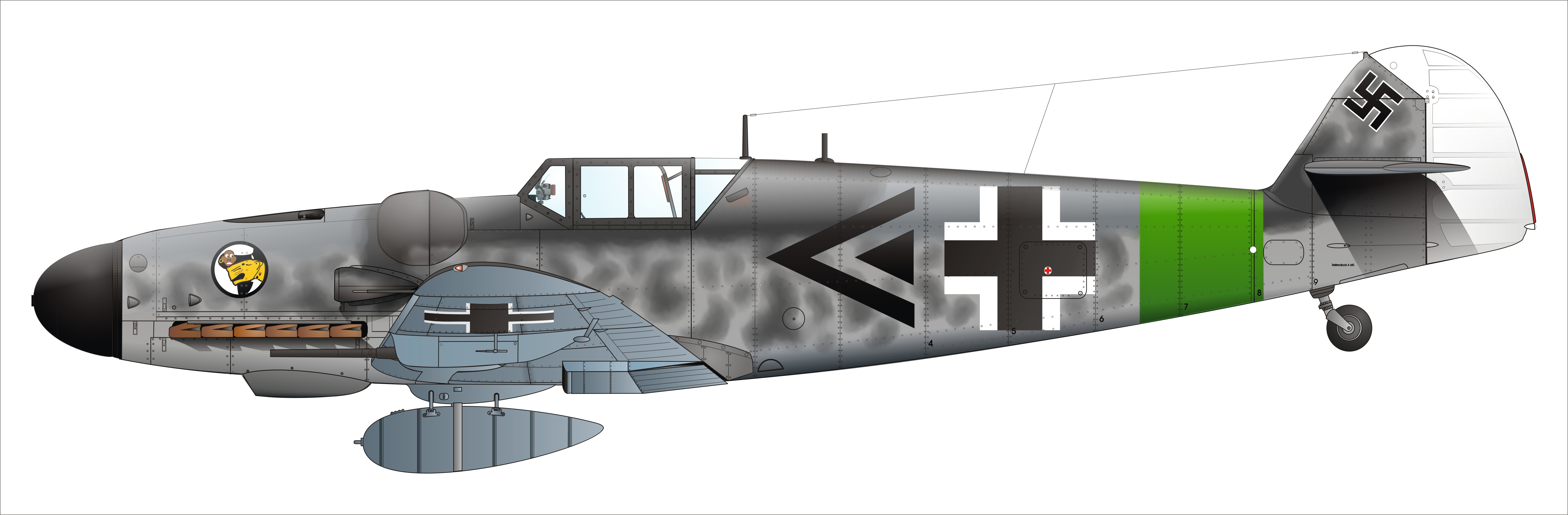
Bf 109 G-6 from I./JG 27; typical of the Bf 109s flown by JG 27 in 1943

On 1 October I./JG 27 was sent to intercept the Eighth Air Force's attack on the Messerschmitt factory at Wiener Neustadt. The US Twelfth Air Force was sent to bomb Augsburg. Luftwaffe defences were still weak in this region, and inexperienced against heavy bombers, but the gruppe and III./JG 3, with Messerschmitt Me 410s from I. Gruppe of Kampfgeschwader 51 in support. JG 3 claimed seven and I. Gruppe of JG 27 claimed six. American records reflect the loss of ten heavy bombers. On 4 October the Eighth AF targeted Frankfurt-am-Main with 155 B-17s from the 1st Bombardment Division, while the 3rd Bombardment Division sent 168 bombers against industrial targets in the Saar, and specifically the Saint-Dizier airbase which housed the recently arrived I./JG 27. The Gruppe withdrew to Wiesbaden on 18 November and remained there until 13 May 1944.Ten days later, the Americans initiated a Second Raid on Schweinfurt. I./JG 27 rushed from Austria to forward airfields to refuel and reached the bomber stream claiming six. The raid was a costly failure for the USAAF, and the high commands on both sides could see it was a victory for the defenders. On 2 November the Fifteenth AF attacked the Messerschmitt factory at Wiener Neustadt again. The attack was successful; only 11 of the 112 bombers failed to return. I./JG 27, II./JG 51, II./JG 53 and the factory protection schwarm claimed successes, but Göring and General der Jagdflieger Adolf Galland (former JG 27 adjutant) were dissatisfied and personally flew to Austria to rebuke the group commanders.

In February 1944 the US Eighth and Fifteenth Air Forces began "Big Week". American bomber operations were now protected by growing numbers of long-range US single-engine fighters. On 22 February 1944, the Fifteenth was relieved of support operations in Italy and ordered to attack the Regensburg area, covered by the 7. Jagddivision and its Austrian Fighter Leader command. I./JG 27 flew in action to protect the Messerschmitt factories in the region. Scrambled from Wels-am-Wagram, with eight Bf 109s from the fighter leader school nearby. They assembled over Vienna and flew to Linz, but some JG 27 pilots were dissatisfied with the cooperation from the leader's school. Three B-24s were claimed destroyed and two were reported as Herausschüsse ("forced from formation"), losing two killed and one wounded. The school leaders claimed one Consolidated B-24 Liberator without loss. The weather over Central Europe was clear on 22 February and the Eighth began a complex, three-pronged assault on Schweinfurt, Gotha and Rostock. The Fifteenth supported by sending forces to Styr. The 5th Bombardment Wing was committed to the latter, with escort only on the withdrawal phase. I./JG 27, II./JG 53 and II. Gruppe of Zerstörergeschwader 1 (ZG 1—1st Destroyer Wing) intercepted 160 kilometres (99 miles) from the city. III./JG 3 and II./ZG 76 arrived as the bomb-run began. All gruppen concentrated on the 2nd Bombardment Group's 33 B-17s with over 120 fighters. This American unit lost 14 and one damaged. The 301st Bombardment Group lost three before P-38s dispersed the attacks while Republic P-47 Thunderbolts from the 325th Fighter Group arrived too late to influence the battle. German pilots claimed 23 B-17s, and two P-38s for ten losses. The Fifteenth sent more unescorted bombers to Regensburg on 25 February, an hour before the Eighth was due to attack it. I./JG 27 and II./ZG 1 intercepted the bombers near Klagenfurt and reported successes. III./JG 3 and JG 27 with parts of ZG 76 achieved many shoot-downs at low cost. The Americans lost 19 B-17s and 21 B-24s were destroyed; P-38s arrived to shoot down one German fighter for three losses.

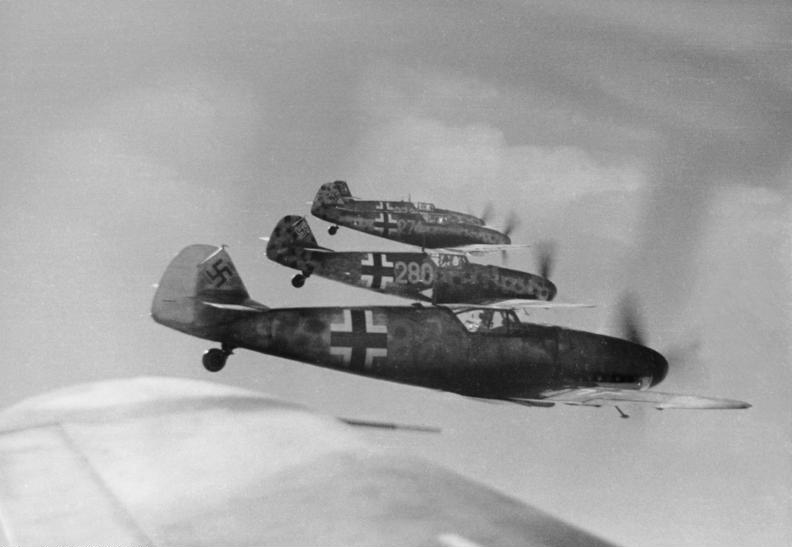
Bf 109 G-6s over France, 20 July 1944. The G-6 nearest the camera carries a Erla Haube canopy

Luftflotte Reich was the air fleet responsible for "Defence of the Reich" operations. These elements of JG 27 were in combat before the end of the month. On 19 March the Fifteenth Air Force hit targets around Graz. III. and IV. Gruppe sent 87 Bf 109s to intercept on their first combat mission. They found a bomber stream of unescorted Consolidated B-24 Liberator bombers. The pilots attacked from all directions except head-on — not a popular approach in the wing — but suffered the loss of ten Bf 109s and six pilots to American gunners. In return, the Germans claimed 27 B-24s. This was reduced to 21 "confirmed". Actual American losses were six B-17s and 12 B-24s; eight from the 454th Bombardment Group. JG 27 did not normally employ a set formation to engage heavy bombers but took advantage of the prevailing situation. JG 27 tended to attack in staffeln, from the rear and sometimes from the front. On 28 May, JG 27 was in action over Central Germany as the Eighth Air Force bombed oil targets. Near Magdeburg, IV./JG 27 was escorting other units into battle. The lack of US fighter cover allowed them to join the bomber-attacks. Nearly all of the B-17s they damaged went down. The 94th Bombardment Wing lost 15 bombers; only six bombed the target. JG 27 claimed 16 B-17s and one North American P-51 Mustang for four killed and two wounded. Seven Bf 109s were destroyed. The gruppe was given credit for driving the bombers away from the target, a rare achievement and close to the literal truth. At the beginning of April 1944, the Fifteenth began operations in Hungary, Hitler's Axis ally. On 3 April, they attacked Budapest. Only JG 27 gruppen were near enough to engage the bombers. They pilots claimed five bombers and one P-38 without loss. Two squadrons of Bf 109s and Messerschmitt Me 210 from the Royal Hungarian Air Force took part in the defence claiming five bombers for two Me 210 and one Re 2000. American total losses were five bombers, while P-38s claimed three Bf 109s and four Me 210s. III./JG 27 was moved from Austria to Budapest the following week, stretching Luftflotte Reich further. On 13 April, the Fifteenth returned to Budapest but lost 18 bombers. III./JG 27, III./JG 3 were involved along with Bf 109 and Me 210s from Hungarian units—13 Me 210s were shot down.

In mid-April the Jagdgeschwader zur besondere Verwendung was established at Kassel. The fighter staff was tasked with leading a 7. Jagddivision Gefechtsverband comprising five orphaned fighter groups from southern Germany; III./JG 3, I./JG 5, II./JG 27, II./JG 53 and III. Gruppe of Jagdgeschwader 54 (JG 54—54th Fighter Wing). The commanding officer was Gerhard Michalski, who relinquished command of III./JG 53. II./JG 27 was moved to form part of Jagdabschnitt Mittelrhein with II./JG 53 as Gefechtsverband Dachs. On 12 May, while defending oil installations in Western Germany, they were attacked by P-51 Mustangs and lost 11 Bf 109s between them. After the German pilots broke free they engaged the bomber formations from either the 1st or 2nd Bombardment Division scoring successes against them over the Taunus Mountains. Rödel led the stabschwarm personal, with I. and III./JG 27 in support and engaged a bomber stream near Frankfurt. The US bombers had heavy fighter escort but JG 27 pilots claimed 24 B-17s and two P-51s for three killed, seven wounded and 14 Bf 109s. The returning American bombers had been in action with fighters from the 1 and 2. Jagddivision and most likely had already been damaged. The American oil Campaign on 12 May had achieved success, inflicting permanent shortfalls in the production of aviation fuels. On 14 May 1944, II. Gruppe was moved from 7. Jagddivision back to Fighter Leader Austria to rebuild and unite with its wing. On 29 May, I. Gruppe lost its commanding officer, Karl-Wolfgang Redlich, killed in action with US fighters.

On 6 June Operation Overlord began with the Normandy Landings. The invasion opened up the Western Front, dormant on land since 1940. The USAAF, RCAF and RAF and subordinated foreign elements had achieved air supremacy over Western Europe by June 1944, and the Luftwaffe was unable to challenge their superiority. Moreover, the quality of German fighter pilots had been diminished in four years of uninterrupted fighting. Fuel shortages curtailed training programs, which were shortened to cope with the attrition of pilots sent into battle with too little instruction and experience. The cadre of experienced and successful fighter leaders that remained were wasting assets. JG 27 was among those wings rushed into Normandy to stem the invasion. The weather was bad over home bases which delayed take-offs until the afternoon. I. Gruppe suffered a disastrous transfer. 15 Bf 109s crash-landed after their pilots got lost and ran out of fuel. The new bases in France were emergency strips, short of essential equipment and inadequately camouflaged for permanent occupation. JG 27 fielded four gruppen on 31 May 1944. All for of the Stabschwarm's aircraft were operational. I. Gruppe contained 41 fighters (31 operational), II. Gruppe 24 (12), III. Gruppe, 26 (20) and IV. Gruppe 18 (12). The Stabschwarm and IV. Gruppe moved to Champfleury, Marne, I. Gruppe transferred to Vertus while the remaining gruppen stayed in Germany and Austria.

The situation in Normandy grew so critical that Reichsmarschall Göring tried to cut losses by introducing a scale, which permitted his squadron, group and wing commanders into battle provided they led large formations of fighters. Rödel led his three combat units into battle through Normandy, but suffered a "blood-letting" over France. Heinrich Bartels of VI. Gruppe retained his position as the formation's top-achiever with nine US fighters claimed, taking his tally to 85. The survivors fought on, but were able to claim only three more victories before being withdrawn to Germany in mid-August. Major Ernst Düllberg's III./JG 27 came a close second to IV. Gruppe in the numbers of Allied aircraft destroyed over Normandy after arriving at Connantre. Luftwaffe fighter units had been withdrawn east of Paris by mid-August. These airfields were less vulnerable to attack, but put German aviators at a greater distance from the front, burned precious fuel and reduced loiter time over the front. Nevertheless, the JG 27 gruppen, then assigned to the 4. Jagddivision replaced JG 1 of the 5. Jagddivision as the main units responsible for air operations west of the Seine on 17 August. An order for the destruction of Paris airfields housing IV./JG 27 and III./JG 54 were made on this date in preparation for an evacuation.

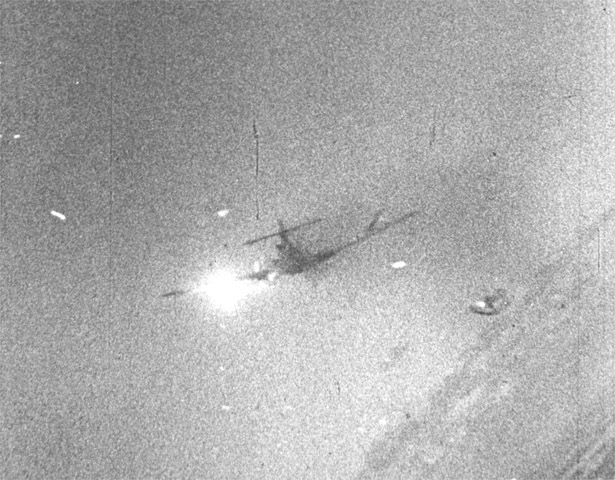
Bf 109 on an American gun camera. The 2 November 1944 was the worst day of the war for JG 27

II./JG 27 had been left in Germany. With III./JG 1 it served as an assembly point for German fighter units to cover shuttling operations to France. Gerhard Schöpfel took command of an ad hoc unit (JG zbV), which became Stab of Jagdgeschwader 4 (JG 4—4th Fighter Wing). This controlled the two gruppen. The gruppe was equipped with the Bf 109 G-6/AS high altitude variant and returned to RLV operations in the 8. Jagddivision. The change brought immediate casualties. II./JG 27 was sent to intercept a Fifteenth Air Force raid on Budapest. Tasked with escort to heavy fighter units, it had no aircraft to escort and attacked B-24 wings over Lake Balaton. They were only able to claim a single bomber before US escorts arrived and destroyed eight Bf 109s killing five pilots and wounding two. On 7 July it opposed American raids on Leipzig; the following day it fought in defence of oil installations near Vienna; on 25 July over Linz escorting II. Gruppe of Jagdgeschwader 300 (JG 300—300th Fighter Wing) and I. Gruppe of Jagdgeschwader 302 (JG 302—302nd Fighter Wing); 7 August over Blechhammer. As far as can be ascertained, two pilots were killed, four fighters lost for four fighters and one bomber claimed. In September 1944, JG 27 returned to the Defence of the Reich operations after the collapse in Normandy. Allied armies and air forces were now lined up along Germany's border. For the next fourteen weeks most of JG 27 fought over Germany and Austria. On 11 September six pilots were killed opposing the Eighth; during the month there were 17 casualties; 12 of them fatalities. On 12 September, II. Gruppe flew as part of Walther Dahl's Gefechtsverband from I. Jagdkorps, supporting JG 300, I., IV. (Sturm)/JG 3 and III./JG 53. The initial attacks were successful, but the following waves from the II. Jagdkorps suffered heavy losses. The two fighter corps mustered, 147 fighters; 76 of them were shot down by the US 354th Fighter Group and 4th Fighter Group. 42 pilots were killed and 14 wounded; 52 percent of the attacking force.

On 17 September 1944, the Anglo-Canadian 21st Army Group began Operation Market Garden in the Netherlands, with the aim of striking across the Rhine to the Ruhr and ending the war that year. The operation failed, and JG 27 took no major part in it. From October through to early November 1944, the loss rate reached a peak. On 2 November 1944, JG 27 attempted to intercept an Eighth Air Force bombing raid. They failed to shoot down a single American bomber, but claimed six P-51s; the battle cost exactly 50 Bf 109s with 27 pilots killed and 12 wounded in action. It was the worst loss of the war for JG 27. JG 27 was the worst-hit Luftwaffe fighter unit on the day. Another four pilots were killed on 26 November. By mid-December 1944, another 39 pilots were killed and 14 wounded; almost 100 since 2 November. In late 1944 morale had fallen and while production replaced losses, fuel and pilots were hard to come by. Leutnant Hans-Ulrich Flade, I./JG 27 remarked that it was easier simply to get a new aircraft than have one repaired: "We simply went to the depot nearby, where they had hundreds of brand new Bf 109 G-10s, G-14s and even the very latest K models. There was no proper organisation any more: the depot staff just said, "There are the aircraft, take what you want and go away". But getting fuel, that was more difficult.". At this time, Flade recalls the 20 pilots in the gruppe were low in morale; daily missions cost two or three pilots. New pilots did not last long, for conversion time on to types was non-existent and many of the newcomers flew only two or three sorties before being shot down. Flade's gruppe was ordered to escort other fighters, to attack US escorts and force them to drop their external tanks. Flade said the standard tactics were to dive in pairs, make an attack, then break; dogfighting the numerous escorting fighters was foolish. On 5 December 1944 RAF Bomber Command attacked the rail stations at Soest, Germany in daylight. Two gruppen of JG 27 failed to break through the Fighter Command escort; the Eighth Air Force struck at Berlin. The Luftwaffe lost 44 killed and 16 wounded plus 77 fighters. The Americans lost no bombers and 11 fighters; the RAF no bombers and one Spitfire. The 12 December improved results. The Merseburg-Leuna plant was targeted by the Eighth AF while RAF Bomber Command bombed the Witten steel plant. IV. Gruppe led by Hanns-Heinz Dudeck, attempted to intercept. The pilots were inexperienced but took off from Achmer. They caught 140 Avro Lancaster bombers and shot down eight before the escorts intervened. Subsequently, one Bf 109 and one Mustang were lost.

On 16 December Hitler gambled his remaining Panzer Divisions, by ordering the Wehrmacht and Waffen SS to begin the Ardennes Offensive, to retrieve Germany's military situation. JG 27 would lose another 50 pilots in the last week of 1944 over Belgium. IV. Gruppe remained at Achmer, II. Gruppe at Hopsten, Stab, I. and III. Gruppe at Rheine were the JG 27 contingent. I. Gruppe were prepared for fighter-bomber missions. II and IV. Gruppen flew the Bf 109 G-14 and 10 respectively, I. Gruppe flew the G-14 and new K-4 while III. Gruppe was fully equipped with the K-4. The following morning a fight with P-38s from the 404th Fighter Group cost the wing six dead and four wounded; Staffelkapitan Herbert Rehfeld was killed. Concurrently, I. Gruppe clashed with No. 56 Squadron RAF near Nijmegen while they provided escort for Messerschmitt Me 262 jets from Kampfgeschwader 51. In the battle another four were killed or captured. In combat again with the 404th Fighter Group that day, I. Gruppe was able to claim 16 US fighters which matched the Ninth Air Force exactly. JG 26 and JG 27 were able to frustrate Allied domination of the air on 17 December, but it cost the Luftwaffe 68 fighters, 55 pilots killed or missing and 24 wounded. The following morning JG 27 fought in many battles over Cologne. I. Gruppe suffered one loss to friendly fire but III. Gruppe suffered severe losses; eight are specifically known. Later, the US 365th Fighter Group and 368th Fighter Group accounted for three Bf 109 K-4s from III. Gruppe. Five days later, JG 4, Gruppe of Jagdgeschwader 11, JG 27 and JG 54 fought in more battles over Cologne. Among the JG 27 casualties was the 99-victory ace Heinrich Bartels. His remains were found in 1968. Rödel, Geschwaderkommodore accused 20 percent of his pilots of breaking off attacks early and retreating. He threatened courts-martial for those who did it again. The message was picked up and read by Ultra. Christmas Eve brought I. Gruppe no respite and it fought high-altitude battles in support of JG 3 costing the wing another four pilots missing or killed. Later in the day the wing flew with JG 3 and Jagdgeschwader 6 against the Eighth Air Force. The German fighters shot down four B-17s, including that of Brigadier General Frederick Walker Castle. Christmas Day was another expensive day; JG 27 lost 13 pilots without making a single claim as the Luftwaffe sought to continue to challenge for air superiority. Ludwig Franzisket led JG 27 into combat on 27 December 1944 (he replaced Rödel as Geschwaderkommodore three days later) and for the first time JG 27 outscored their opponents, claiming 10 aircraft for eight losses, one of which was the commanding officer of 7./JG 27, Gernot Stein. Three of their losses were sustained in action with No. 404 Squadron RCAF as JG 27 fought to cover German forces in the Battle of St. Vith and Siege of Bastogne. Franzisket personally claimed a P-38 as his gruppe penetrated the US fighter screen surrounding St. Vith. JG 6, JG 27 and JG 54 engaged RAF forces on 29 December; 31 German fighters were destroyed with the loss of 20 pilots for 11 British fighters.

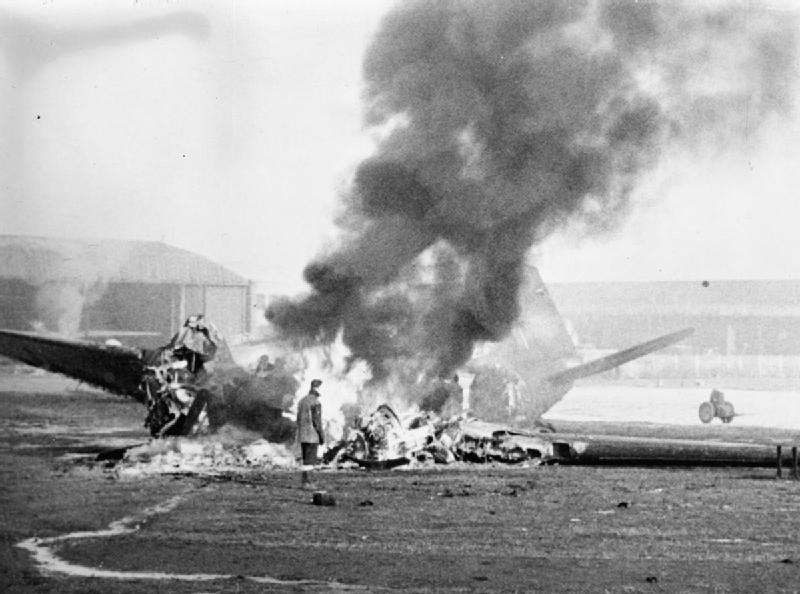
Douglas Dakota of RAF Transport Command burns at Melsbroek, 1 January 1945

A last major effort was made on 1 January 1945 to gain aerial superiority and restart the faltering offensive. JG 27 took part in a large air attack on Allied bases in Belgium, Netherlands and France. Operation Bodenplatte ordered JG 27 to attack the Brussels—Melsbroek Air Base. On 31 December, JG 27 could only muster the following operational pilots and aircraft: 22 (22) from I., 19 (13) from II., 13 (15) from III., and 16 (17) from IV. Gruppe. IV./JG 54 accompanied JG 27. It had only 21 pilots and 15 of its 23 Focke-Wulf Fw 190s were operational. Altogether 28 Bf 109s of JG 27 and 15 Fw 190s of JG 54 took off. Seven fighters were lost to enemy aircraft and friendly anti-aircraft artillery fire before they reached the target. The pilots of JG 27 and 54 claimed 85 British aircraft destroyed and 40 damaged. German reconnaissance was able to confirm 49. JG 27 suffered unacceptable losses; 17 Bf 109s, 11 pilots killed, one wounded and three captured. IV./JG 54 lost two killed and one captured. Three Fw 190s were lost and one damaged. The Luftwaffe lost more aircraft on this day than any other through the war. The more serious losses were the fighter pilots that could not be replaced. Hauptmann Hanns-Heinz Dudeck, commanding IV. Gruppe, was shot down on the return journey; the veteran pilot with ten years service survived a parachute failure and hit a tree. He was subsequently captured. On 21 January 1945, Gerhard Hoyer, commanding II. Gruppe was killed, representing the loss of another experienced veteran.

The failure of the offensive in January 1945 led to the Western Allied invasion of Germany in March 1945. JG 27 remained in combat in the west. On 24 March 1945, III. Gruppe reported another one-sided fight with P-51 Mustangs, claiming one for eight pilots killed and one wounded. JG 27 lost another 47 dead or missing during the month. IV. Gruppe was disbanded on the last day, reducing the wing to three gruppen. Such was the superiority of the Allied air forces by mid-March that all four gruppen were not combat effective. I. and II. Gruppe moved to Grossenhain near Berlin in mid-April. II. Gruppe then transferred north to Leck where it surrendered on 8 May 1945 to the British and Canadians. I. Gruppe retreated south, surrendering at Salzburg on 8 May. III. Gruppe moved to Saalbach, even further away before it too capitulated the same day. Over 1,000 men in all surrendered to American forces in the south. In the last months of the war, since January 1945, 126 pilots of JG 27 were killed or posted missing in action.

== Post-war analysis ==
Australian author Russell Brown has cast doubt on the accuracy of aerial victory claims by JG 27 pilots in North Africa. Brown, who has researched the records of individual Desert Air Force squadrons, suggests that Luftwaffe claim confirmation in North Africa was less stringent than it had been during the Battle of Britain. Brown points out specific, documented examples of spurious verification, such as one "confirmation" by a Panzer commander, who merely saw a "cloud of dust", after an Allied plane passed behind a sand dune. He also lists several dates on which there was significant, demonstrable over-claiming by JG 27 pilots. For example, pilots from JG 27 were credited with destroying 19 or 20 P-40s from No. 239 Wing (No. 3 Squadron RAAF, No. 112 Squadron RAF and No. 450 Squadron RAAF) on 15 September 1942. Marseille alone claimed seven kills in six minutes. However, the records of the individual Allied squadrons show a total of five aircraft lost to enemy action that day and one lost to friendly AA fire. This analysis is supported by other authors. Brown states: "Clearly in the combat of 15 September, there could not have been seven accurate eyewitness reports, let alone twenty [emphasis in original], but Marseille's seven victory claims were accepted without question... [and] other recognised Experten, Schröer, Homuth and von Lieres submitted a total of six further [accepted] claims between them.".

Author Christopher Shores and his co-authors point to an interview with Eduard Neumann, commanding officer of JG 27, who insisted their work included an incident of deliberate claiming of enemy aircraft when no combat took place. A number of pilots, observed by Stahlschmidt, were seen strafing the desert surface. When he landed he reported the incident. The pilots in question, which included Karl-Heinz Bendert and Franz Stigler, had reported 12 RAF fighters destroyed. The JG 27 staff was at a loss as to what action to take. Until this time, Luftwaffe claims had taken account of possible errors and credited victory claims with reasonable accuracy. Some pilots distrusted 4./JG 27, the guilty Staffel, and wished to see them punished. The pilots involved denied falsifying their claims. It was decided not to report the matter to the OKL, for it would reflect badly on the unit. The guilty men were sent to other units, their future claims treated with scepticism, and finally ejected from JG 27 when the opportunity arose. All of their claims in the war were to be deleted, but when they returned to Germany they were still given credit; Bendert was even awarded the Knight's Cross. The incident has raised some general suspicions about Luftwaffe fighter pilots in general.

== Commanding officers ==
• Oberst Max Ibel	1 October 1939	–	10 October 1940
• Major Bernhard Woldenga	11 October 1940	–	22 October 1940
• Major Wolfgang Schellmann	22 October 1940	–	21 June 1941 †
• Oberstleutnant Bernhard Woldenga	21 June 1941	–	10 June 1942
• Oberstleutnant Eduard Neumann	10 June 1942	–	22 April 1943
• Oberst Gustav Rödel	22 April 1943	–	29 December 1944
• Major Ludwig Franzisket	30 December 1944	–	8 May 1945

=== Gruppenkommandeure ===
==== I. Gruppe of JG 27 ====
• Hauptmann Helmut Riegel	1 October 1939	–	20 July 1940 †
• Major Eduard Neumann	July 1940	–	10 June 1942
• Hauptmann Gerhard Homuth	10 June 1942	–	November 1942
• Hauptmann Heinrich Setz	12 November 1942	–	13 March 1943 †
• Hauptmann Hans-Joachim Heinecke (acting)	17 March 1943	–	7 April 1943
• Hauptmann Erich Hohagen	7 April 1943	–	1 June 1943
• Hauptmann Hans Remmer (acting)	1 June 1943	–	15 July 1943
• Hauptmann Ludwig Franzisket	15 July 1943	–	12 May 1944
• Hauptmann Hans Remmer (acting)	March 1944	–	2 April 1944 †
• Hauptmann Walter Blume (acting)	3 April 1944	–	April 1944
• Hauptmann Ernst Börngen	13 May 1944	–	19 May 1944
• Major Karl-Wolfgang Redlich	19 May 1944	–	29 May 1944 †
• Hauptmann Walter Blume	29 May 1944	–	11 June 1944
• Hauptmann Rudolf Sinner	12 June 1944	–	30 July 1944
• Hauptmann Siegfried Luckenbach (acting)	30 July 1944	–	15 August 1944
• Hauptmann Diethelm von Eichel-Streiber	25 August 1944	–	30 November 1944
• Hauptmann Johannes Neumayer	1 December 1944	–	11 December 1944 †
• Hauptmann Schüller (acting)	11 December 1944	–	22 December 1944
• Hauptmann Eberhard Schade	22 December 1944	–	1 March 1945 †
• Leutnant Buchholz (acting)	1 March 1945	–	3 April 1945
• Hauptmann Emil Clade	3 April 1945	–	8 May 1945

==== II. Gruppe of JG 27 ====
• Hauptmann Erich von Selle	1 January 1940	–	31 January 1940
• Hauptmann Walter Andres	1 February 1940	–	30 September 1940
• Oberleutnant Ernst Düllberg (acting)	8 August 1940	–	4 September 1940
• Hauptmann Wolfgang Lippert	4 September 1940	–	23 November 1941
• Oberleutnant Gustav Rödel (acting)	23 November 1941	–	25 December 1941
• Hauptmann Erich Gerlitz	25 December 1941	–	20 May 1942
• Hauptmann Gustav Rödel	20 May 1942	–	20 April 1943
• Major Werner Schröer	20 April 1943	–	13 March 1944
• Hauptmann Fritz Keller	14 March 1944	–	17 December 1944
• Hauptmann Herbert Kutscha	December 1944	–	20 January 1945
• Oberleutnant Anton Wöffen (acting)	3 January 1945	–	20 January 1945
• Hauptmann Gerhard Hoyer	21 January 1945	–	21 January 1945 †
• Hauptmann Fritz Keller	January 1945	–	8 May 1945

==== III. Gruppe of JG 27 ====
I./JG 131 — renamed to I./JG 130 on 1 November 1938 — renamed to I./JG 1 on 1 April 1939
• Major Bernhard Woldenga	1 April 1937	–	13 February 1940
I./JG 1 — renamed to III./JG 27 on 9 July 1940
• Hauptmann Joachim Schlichting	13 February 1940	-	6 September 1940
• Hauptmann Max Dobislav	7 September 1940	–	30 September 1941
• Hauptmann Erhard Braune	1 October 1941	–	11 October 1942
• Hauptmann Ernst Düllberg	16 October 1942	–	30 September 1944
• Oberleutnant Franz Stigler (acting)	1 October 1944	–	7 October 1944
• Hauptmann Dr. Peter Werfft	October 1944	–	7 May 1945
• Oberleutnant Emil Clade (acting)	February 1945	–	3 April 1945

==== IV. Gruppe of JG 27 ====
• Hauptmann Rudolf Sinner	June 1943	–	13 September 1943
• Oberleutnant Dietrich Boesler (acting)	September 1943	–	10 October 1943 †
• Oberleutnant Alfred Burk (acting)	October 1943	–	18 October 1943
• Hauptmann Joachim Kirschner	19 October 1943	–	17 December 1943 †
• Hauptmann Otto Meyer	December 1943	–	12 July 1944 †
• Hauptmann Hanns-Heinz Dudeck	July 1944	–	1 January 1945
• Hauptmann Ernst-Wilhelm Reinert	2 January 1945	–	23 March 1945

== Notes ==
=== References ===
- Becze, Csaba (2008). Az Arany sas nyomában: Szilaj Varga Gyula és a magyar gyorsbombázók a II. világháborúban [On the trail of the golden eagle: Gyula Szilaj Varga and the hungarian fast bombers in the second world war] (in Hungarian). Nagykovácsi, Pest, Hungary: Puedló Kiadó. ISBN 978-963-2490-588.
- Bergström, Christer (2007). Barbarossa - The Air Battle: July–December 1941. London: Chevron/Ian Allan. ISBN 978-1-85780-270-2.
- Bergström, Christer (2015). The Battle of Britain: An Epic Conflict Revisited. Oxford: Casemate. ISBN 978-1612-00347-4.
- Bowen, H. Wayne (2006). Spain during World War II. Missouri: University of Missouri. ISBN 0-8262-1658-7.
- Brookes, Andrew (2000). Air War Over Italy, 1943-1945. London: I. Allan. ISBN 978-0711026902.
- Brown, Russell (2000). Desert Warriors: Australian P-40 Pilots at War in the Middle East and North Africa, 1941–1943. Maryborough, Queensland, Australia: Banner Books. ISBN 978-1-875593-22-4.
- Bungay, Stephen (2000). The Most Dangerous Enemy: A History of the Battle of Britain. London: Aurum Press. ISBN 978-1-85410-721-3.
- Bungay, Stephen (2002). Alamein. London: Aurum Press. ISBN 978-1-85410-929-3.
- Caldwell, Donald L.; Muller, Richard R. (2007). The Luftwaffe over Germany: Defense of the Reich. London: Greenhill Books. ISBN 978-1-85367-712-0.
- Caldwell, Donald L. (1998). The JG 26 War Diary: Volume Two 1943–1945. London: Grub Street. ISBN 978-1-898697-86-2.
- Manrho, John; Pütz, Ron (2004). Bodenplatte: The Luftwaffe's Last Hope-The Attack on Allied Airfields, New Year's Day 1945. Ottringham: Hikoki Publications. ISBN 1-902109-40-6.
- Corum, James (2008). Wolfram von Richthofen: Master of the German Air War. Lawrence: University Press of Kansas. ISBN 978-0-7006-1598-8.
- Cull, Brian; Lander, Bruce; Weiss, Heinrich (1999). Twelve Days in May. London: Grub Street Publishing. ISBN 978-1-902304-12-0.
- Franks, Norman (1994). The Battle of the Airfields: 1 January 1945. London: Grub Street. ISBN 1-898697-15-9.
- Franks, Norman (1997). Royal Air Force Fighter Command Losses of the Second World. Volume 1: Operational losses: Aircraft and crews, 1939–1941. Leicester: Midland Publishing. ISBN 978-1-85780-055-5.
- Franks, Norman (2006). Air Battle for Dunkirk, 26 May - 3 June 1940. London: Grub Street. ISBN 1-904943-43-8.
- Frieser, Karl-Heinz (2005). The Blitzkrieg Legend. Maryland: Naval Institute Press. ISBN 978-1-59114-294-2.
- Girbig, Werner (1975). Six Months to Oblivion: Defeat of the Luftwaffe Fighter Force Over the Western Front, 1944/45. New York: Hippocrene Books. ISBN 978-0-88254-360-4.
- Heaton, Colin; Lewis, Anne-Marie (2012). The Star of Africa: The Story of Hans Marseille, the Rogue Luftwaffe Ace. London: Zenith Press. ISBN 978-0-7603-4393-7.
- Hinsley, Harry (1988). British Intelligence in the Second World War. Volume 3, Part 2: Its Influence on Strategy and Operations. London: Her Majesty's Stationery Office (HMSO). ISBN 0-11-630940-7.
- Hooton, E.R. (1994). Phoenix Triumphant; The Rise and Rise of the Luftwaffe. London: Arms & Armour Press. ISBN 978-1-85409-181-9.
- Hooton, E.R. (2007b). Luftwaffe at War; Blitzkrieg in the West: Volume 2. London: Chevron/Ian Allan. ISBN 978-1-85780-272-6.
- Hooton, E.R. (1999). Eagle in Flames: Defeat of the Luftwaffe. Weidenfeld & Nicolson. ISBN 978-1-85409-343-1.
- Jackson, Robert (1974). Air War Over France, 1939-1940. London: Ian Allan. ISBN 978-0-7110-0510-5.
- Klinkowitz, Jerome (1989). Their Finest Hours: Narratives of the Raf and Luftwaffe in Ww II. Iowa: Iowa State University Press. ISBN 978-0813801223.
- Levine, Alan (2008). The War Against Rommel's Supply Lines, 1942–43. London: Stackpole Books. ISBN 978-0-8117-3458-5.
- Mason, Francis (1969). Battle Over Britain. London: McWhirter Twins. ISBN 978-0-901928-00-9.
- Muller, Richard (1992). The German Air War in Russia, 1941-1945. Baltimore: The Nautical & Aviation Publishing Company of America. ISBN 1-877853-13-5.
- Murray, Williamson (1983). Strategy for Defeat: The Luftwaffe 1933–1945. Maxwell AFB: Air University Press. ISBN 978-1-58566-010-0.
- National Archives (2001). The Rise and Fall of the German Air Force: 1933-1945. London: Public Record Office. ISBN 978-1-903365-30-4.
- Parker, Danny S (1998). To Win The Winter Sky: Air War over the Ardennes, 1944-1945. Pennsylvania: Combined. ISBN 978-0-938289-35-7.
- Pataki, Iván; Rozsos, László; Sárhidai, Gyula (1992). Légi Háború Magyarország Felett I. [Air war over Hungary I.] (in Hungarian). Budapest, Hungary: Zrinyi Kiadó. ISBN 963-327-154-1.
- Price, Alfred (1990). Battle of Britain Day: 15 September 1940. London: Greenhill books. ISBN 978-1-85367-375-7.
- Price, Alfred (2010). The Hardest Day: The Battle of Britain: 18 August 1940. London: Haynes Publishing. ISBN 978-1-84425-820-8.
- Price, Alfred (1991). The Last Year of the Luftwaffe: May 1944 to May 1945. London: Greenhill Publishing. ISBN 1-85367-440-0.
- Prien, Jochen; Rodeike, Peter; Stemmer, Gerhard (1998). Messerschmitt Bf 109 im Einsatz bei Stab und I./Jagdgeschwader 27 1939 – 1945 [Messerschmitt Bf 109 in Action with the Headquarters Unit and I./Jagdgeschwader 27 in 1939 – 1945] (in German). Eutin, Germany: Struve-Druck. ISBN 978-3-923457-46-5.
- Prien, Jochen; Rodeike, Peter; Stemmer, Gerhard (1997). Messerschmitt Bf 109 im Einsatz bei II./Jagdgeschwader 27, 1940 – 1945 [Messerschmitt Bf 109 in Action with II./Jagdgeschwader 27, 1940 – 1945] (in German). Eutin, Germany: Struve-Druck. ISBN 978-3-923457-42-7.
- Prien, Jochen; Rodeike, Peter; Stemmer, Gerhard (1995). Messerschmitt Bf 109 im Einsatz bei III und IV./Jagdgeschwader 27, 1938 – 1945 [Messerschmitt Bf 109 in Action with III and IV./Jagdgeschwader 27, 1938 – 1945] (in German). Eutin, Germany: Struve-Druck. ISBN 978-3-923457-30-4.
- Prien, Jochen; Stemmer, Gerhard; Rodeike, Peter; Bock, Winfried (2001). Die Jagdfliegerverbände der Deutschen Luftwaffe 1934 bis 1945—Teil 2—Der "Sitzkrieg"—1.9.1939 bis 9.5.1941 [The Fighter Units of the German Air Force 1934 to 1945—Part 2—The "Phoney War"—1 September 1939 to 9 May 1940] (in German). Eutin, Germany: Struve-Druck. ISBN 978-3-923457-59-5.
- Ring, Hans; Girbig, Werner (1979). Jagdgeschwader 27 Die Dokumentation über den Einsatz an allen Fronten 1939–1945 [Jagdgeschwader 27 The Documentation on the Deployment on all Fronts from 1939 to 1945] (in German). Stuttgart, Germany: Motorbuch Verlag. ISBN 978-3-87943-215-8.
- Saunders, Andy (2013). Stuka Attack! The Dive-Bombing Assault on England During the Battle of Britain. London: Grub Street. ISBN 978-1-908117-35-9.
- Scutts, Jerry (1996). Messerschmitt Bf 109: The Operational Record. London: Motorbooks International. ISBN 978-0-760302-62-0.
- Scutts, Jerry (1994). Bf 109 Aces of North Africa and the Mediterranean. London: Osprey Publishing. ISBN 978-1-85532-448-0.
- Shores, Christopher F.; Cull, Brian; Malizia, Nicola (1992). Air War for Yugoslavia, Greece and Crete: 1940–41. London: Grub Street. ISBN 978-0-948817-07-6.
- Shores, Christopher; Foreman, John; Ehrengardt, Chris (1992). Fledgling Eagles. London: Grub Street. ISBN 978-0-948817-42-7.
- Shores, Christopher F.; Massimello, Giovanni; Guest, Russell (2012a). A History of the Mediterranean Air War, 1940–1945, Volume One: North Africa, June 1940 – February 1942. London: Grub Street. ISBN 978-1-9081-17076.
- Shores, Christopher F.; Massimello, Giovanni; Guest, Russell (2012b). A History of the Mediterranean Air War, 1940–1945, Volume Two: North African Desert, February 1942 – March 1943. London: Grub Street. ISBN 978-1-909166-12-7.
- Shores, Christopher F.; Massimello, Giovanni; Guest, Russell; Olynyk, Frank; Bock, Winfried (2016). A History of the Mediterranean Air War, 1940–1945, Volume Three: Tunisia and the end in Africa, November 1942 – May 1943. London: Grub Street. ISBN 978-1-910690-00-0.
- Shores, Christopher; Massimello, Giovanni; Guest, Russell; Olynyk, Frank; Bock, Winfried; Thomas, Andy (2018). A History of the Mediterranean Air War, 1940–1945, Volume Four: Sicily and Italy to the Fall of Rome, 14 May 1943 – 5 June 1944. London: Grub Street. ISBN 978-1-911621-10-2.
- Shores, Christopher; Ring, Hans (1969). Fighters over the Desert. London: Neville Spearman Limited. ISBN 978-0-668-02070-1.
- Shores, Christopher F.; Ring, Hans; Hess, William N. (1975). Fighters Over Tunisia. London: Neville Spearman. ISBN 978-0-85435-210-4.
- Turner, John (2014). Analysis Of German Operation Art Failures, The Battle Of Britain, 1940. Lucknow [Kindle Edition]. ISBN 9781782897514.
- Weal, John (2003). Jagdgeschwader 27 "Afrika". Aviation Elite Units. Vol. 12. London: Osprey Publishing. ISBN 978-1-84176-538-9.
- Weal, John (1996). Bf 109D-E Aces, 1939-1941. Aircraft of the Aces. Vol. 11. London: Osprey Publishing. ISBN 978-1855324879.
