= Eduard Neumann (fighter pilot) =

German flying ace

- Eduard Neumann (right) with Adolf Galland in North Africa, 22 September 1942.
- Born: 5 June 1911; Molodiia, Austria-Hungary
- Died: 9 August 2004 (aged 93)
- Military career
- Allegiance: Nazi Germany
- Branch: Luftwaffe
- Service years: 1934–1945
- Rank: Oberst
- Units: Condor Legion, JG 26
- Commands: JG 27
- Conflicts: Spanish Civil War; World War II Battle of France Battle of Britain North African campaign

Eduard "Edu" Neumann (5 June 1911 – 9 August 2004) was a Luftwaffe officer and commanded the Jagdgeschwader 27 'Afrika' during the North African Campaign from 1941 to 1943.

== Early life ==
Neumann was born in the city of Molodiia, in the Duchy of Bukovina of the Austro-Hungarian Empire on 5 June 1911. In 1914, at the age of three, Eduard and his sister was sent to live with his grandparents after his mother died, and his father was conscripted due to the start of the First World War. His father was killed on the Russian front in November that year. He attended school in Czernowitz until 1928 before moving to Germany, studying for a year at Dresden before attending university at Berlin.

== Luftwaffe service ==
Neumann learned to fly in Berlin in the early 1930s, and in 1934 joined the Luftwaffe. In 1935, after completing training, he joined II. Gruppe of Jagdgeschwader 132 (II./JG 132), flying the Heinkel He 51 fighter.

On 13 February 1940, Neumann was appointed Geschwaderadjutant, the adjutant of the Geschwaderkommodore (wing commander) of Jagdgeschwader 27 (JG 27—27th Fighter Wing). He succeeded Hauptmann Joachim Schlichting who had previously held this position.

The day after scoring his first (World War II) victory during the opening phase of the Battle of Britain, a RAF No. 236 Squadron RAF Blenheim off the coast of Cherbourg on the 20 July 1940, he was appointed Gruppenkommandeur of I./JG 27. After a brief participation in the Invasion of Yugoslavia, in April 1941 the unit moved to Ain-el Gazala, Libya, North Africa on 18 April 1941. He received the German Cross in Gold on 11 May 1942 as Hauptmann and Gruppenkommandeur I./JG 27.

On 8 June 1942, Neumann, by now a Major, was appointed as Geschwaderkommodore of JG 27, replacing Bernhard Woldenga, while Gerhard Homuth replaced Neumann as Gruppenkommandeur I./JG 27. Neumann successfully led JG 27 until 22 April 1943, when he was replaced by Gustav Rödel. After a period of leave, Neumann joined the Staff of General der Jagdflieger. In March 1943 Neumann was promoted to Oberstleutnant (Lieutenant Colonel), and later in 1944 to Oberst (Colonel). Neumann finished the war as the Commander of Fighter Forces in Northern Italy.

== After the war ==
After the war Neumann worked as a technical consultant on the Hans-Joachim Marseille biographical film, Der Stern von Afrika, (The Star of Africa), directed by Alfred Weidenmann and starring Joachim Hansen as Marseille.

Neumann died in Munich on 9 August 2004.

Military offices
Preceded by Major Bernhard Woldenga	Commander of Jagdgeschwader 27 Afrika; June 10, 1942 – April 22, 1943	Succeeded by Oberstleutnant Gustav Rödel
Preceded by Oberstleutnant Bernhard Woldenga	Commander of Jagdabschnittsführer Rumänien; February 1944 – August 1944	Succeeded by none
Preceded by Oberstleutnant Günther Freiherr von Maltzahn	Commander of Jagdfliegerführer Oberitalien; December 1944 – January 1945	Succeeded by Oberst Günther Lützow
