= Peter Werfft =

Austrian chemist and Luftwaffe fighter ace in World War II (1904–1970)

Dr. chem. Peter Werfft
- Born: 8 October 1904; Vienna, Austria-Hungary
- Died: 23 July 1970 (aged 65); Vienna, Austria
- Military career
- Allegiance: Nazi Germany
- Branch: Luftwaffe
- Service years: 1940 or earlier – 1945
- Rank: Major
- Unit: JG 27
- Commands: III./JG 27
- Conflicts: World War II: Battle of Britain; Unternehmen Bodenplatte
- Awards: Knight's Cross of the Iron Cross
- Other work: chemist

Dr. Peter Werfft-Wessely (8 October 1904 – 23 July 1970), was an Austrian chemist. During World War II, he was decorated by Nazi Germany for service in the Luftwaffe as a fighter ace. After the war, Werfft-Wessely became a chemical industry entrepreneur.

== Luftwaffe ace in World War II ==
Werfft was born on 8 October 1904 in Vienna, the capital of Austria-Hungary.

As a Gefreiter flying with I. Gruppe of Jagdgeschwader 27 (JG 27—27th Fighter Wing), Werfft participated in the Battle of Britain; the two air victories which he scored against RAF Hawker Hurricane fighters on 27 September 1940 was his first.

Werrft served with JG 27 in North Africa during 1941–42, claiming five kills over the Desert Air Force. Werfft was commissioned as a Leutnant (Lieutenant) in late 1942. Service over Greece and the Balkans followed in 1943, where he claimed the destruction of a P-38 Lightning and three USAAF heavy bombers.

On 2 April 1944, III. Gruppe of JG 27 relocated from Wien-Seyring near Vienna to Wolkersdorf. That day, the Gruppe engaged in combat with bombers of United States Army Air Forces (USAAF) Fifteenth Air Force. In this encounter, Werfft claimed two Consolidated B-24 Liberator bombers near Wolfsberg.

On 19 May, Werfft was shot down in his Messerschmitt Bf 109 G-6 (Werknummer 441090—factory number) on a transfer flight to Gardelegen. Wounded in the encounter, Werfft surrendered command of 9. Staffel to Oberleutnant Kurt Heidenreich. Following a period of convalescence, he return to 9. Staffel in October 1944. In December 1944, Werfft was appointed Gruppenkommandeur (group commander) of III. Gruppe of JG 27.

At the end of World War II he was a Major and gruppenkommandeur of III./JG 27, flying a Bf 109 G-6 fighter ("Yellow One") with a green fuselage band signifying dedication to Reich strategic airspace defence; he also had a total of 26 air kills.

Werfft claimed 11 more heavies in 1944, he was a Hauptmann (Captain) by October 1944. He was awarded the Knight's Cross of the Iron Cross (Ritterkreuz des Eisernen Kreuzes) on 28 January 1945, the last pilot of JG 27 to receive this distinction.

On 3 May 1945 he disbanded his III./JG 27 in the Austrian Alps near Saalbach, together with the acting unit commander Hauptmann Emil Clade, eventually becoming a prisoner of war of the United States.

== Pharmaceutical entrepreneur ==
Returning to Austria in 1948, after his release from captivity, Werfft established InterChemie GmbH, a Vienna-based pharmaceutical and chemical limited liability enterprise. Among the first commercial activities of the fledgling trading company in this difficult post-war period was the Austrian sales representation for certain American Cyanamid products. By 1961, the firm had been restructured into a successor company, Werfft-Chemie GmbH. In the years following the founder's death in 1970, Werfft-Chemie continued, initially as a family-run business, but met with increasing economic difficulties. It was taken over by the Austrian Sanochemia Pharmazeutika Group in 1983 and was subsequently converted to a purely veterinary medicine company. The legacy of Werfft-Chemie survived until January 2020 under the name Alvetra u. Werfft AG, a Sanochemia Group company with subsidiaries in several central and eastern European countries; its business assets were acquired by Inovet, another European veterinary company.

== Summary of career ==
=== Aerial victory claims ===
According to Obermaier, Werfft was credited with 26 enemy aircraft shot down, all of which on the Western Front, including five in North Africa. This figure includes 14 four-engined bombers. Mathews and Foreman, authors of Luftwaffe Aces: Biographies and Victory Claims, researched the German Federal Archives and found records for nineteen aerial victory claims, plus seven further unconfirmed claims. All of his aerial victories were claimed on the Western Front and included nine four-engined bombers.

Chronicle of aerial victories
This and the – (dash) indicates unconfirmed aerial victory claims for which Werfft did not receive credit. This along with the * (asterisk) indicates an Herausschuss (separation shot)—a severely damaged heavy bomber forced to separate from his combat box which was counted as an aerial victory. This and the ? (question mark) indicates information discrepancies listed by Prien, Balke, Stemmer, Rodeike, Bock, Mathews and Foreman.
Claim	Date	Time	Type	Location	Unit	Claim	Date	Time	Type	Location	Unit
– Claims with I. Gruppe of Jagdgeschwader 27 – On the Channel Front — June – October 1940
1	27 September 1940	10:10	Hurricane	Sevenoaks	1./JG 27	2? (Note: According to Mathews and Foreman, this claim is unconfirmed.)	27 September 1940	—	Hurricane	north Brighton	1./JG 27
– Claims with I. Gruppe of Jagdgeschwader 27 – Sicily, Balkans and North Africa — 4 December 1940 – 31 May 1941
3	19 July 1941	18:05	P-40	Bay of Sollum	1./JG 27	5	9 September 1941	17:17	Hurricane	Bay of Sollum	1./JG 27
4?	26 August 1941	—	Hurricane	Sidi Barrani	1./JG 27						
– Claims with III. Gruppe of Jagdgeschwader 27 – In North Africa — October – 31 December 1942
6	26 October 1942	16:00	Boston	northeast of the mosque at El Dabaa	9./JG 27? (Note: According to Mathews and Foreman with 7./JG 27.)	7	2 November 1942	15:53	Spitfire	25 km (16 mi) southeast of El Alamein	9./JG 27
– Claims with III. Gruppe of Jagdgeschwader 27 – In the Mediterranean Theater — 20 August – 31 December 1943
— ? (Note: This unconfirmed claim is not listed by Prien, Stemmer, Rodeike and Bock.)	8 October 1943	—	B-24		9./JG 27	9	20 December 1943	12:41	P-38	northwest of Megara	9./JG 27
8	6 December 1943	12:47	B-17	west of Milos	9./JG 27	10	20 December 1943	12:52	B-17	northeast of Megara	9./JG 27
– Claims with III. Gruppe of Jagdgeschwader 27 – Defense of the Reich — March 1944 – May 1945
11?	19 March 1944	13:50	B-24*	southeast Marburg	9./JG 27	18	12 May 1944	12:30	B-17	30 km (19 mi) north-northeast Hanau	9./JG 27
—	19 March 1944	—	B-24	southeast Marburg	9./JG 27	19	19 May 1944	13:15	B-24*	south-southwest Helmstedt	9./JG 27
12	2 April 1944	10:38	B-24	northwest Wolfsberg	9./JG 27	20	19 May 1944	13:30	B-24	east Helmstedt	9./JG 27
13	2 April 1944	10:42	B-24*	northwest Wolfsberg	9./JG 27	21	17 December 1944	14:25	P-47	northeast Coesfeld	9./JG 27
14	6 April 1944	16:25	B-17	east Marburg	9./JG 27	22	23 December 1944	12:05	P-47	20 km (12 mi) southwest Bonn	9./JG 27
15?	12 April 1944	11:50	B-24*	south Ödenburg; 15 km (9.3 mi) northeast of Eisenstadt	9./JG 27	23	27 December 1944	11:10	P-38	10 km (6.2 mi) east Dinant	9./JG 27
16?	12 April 1944	12:00	B-24*	south Ödenburg	9./JG 27	24	27 December 1944	11:20	P-38	10 km (6.2 mi) northwest Losheim	9./JG 27
17	23 May 1944	13:45	B-24	40 km (25 mi) east-southeast Raab	9./JG 27						

=== Awards ===
- Iron Cross (1939) 2nd and 1st Class
- Honour Goblet of the Luftwaffe (Ehrenpokal der Luftwaffe) on 15 July 1944
- German Cross in Gold on 23 July 1944 as Leutnant in the III./Jagdgeschwader 27
- Knight's Cross of the Iron Cross on 28 January 1945 as Hauptmann and Gruppenkommandeur of the III./Jagdgeschwader 27 (Note: According to Scherzer as Oberleutnant of the Reserves)
