= Bernhard Woldenga =

German Luftwaffe pilot

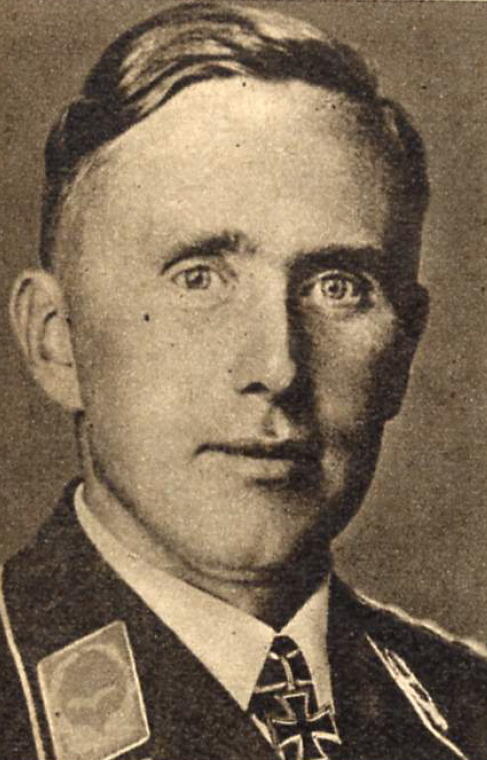
- Born: 4 December 1901; Hamburg, German Empire
- Died: 19 January 1999 (aged 97); Timmendorfer Strand, Germany
- Relatives: Rüdiger von Wechmar (son in law)
- Military career
- Allegiance: Nazi Germany
- Branch: Luftwaffe
- Rank: Oberst (colonel)
- Commands: I./JG 1, JG 27, JG 77
- Conflicts: World War II
- Awards: Knight's Cross of the Iron Cross

Bernhard Woldenga (4 December 1901 – 19 January 1999) was a German pilot during World War II. He served in the Luftwaffe, commanding the JG 27 and JG 77 fighter wings. Woldenga was a recipient of the Knight's Cross of the Iron Cross of Nazi Germany.

== Early life and career ==
Woldenga was born on 4 December 1901 in Hamburg, then in the German Empire. His career started as a captain in the merchant marine. He started his flight training in 1928 and worked as chief pilot for the FVK Warnemünde. He transferred to the newly emerging Luftwaffe, taking command as Gruppenkommandeur of the I. Gruppe of Jagdgeschwader 131 (JG 131—131st Fighter Wing) on 15 March 1937. This unit was then renamed on 1 November 1938 to I. Gruppe of Jagdgeschwader 130 (JG 130—130th Fighter Wing) which then became the I. Gruppe of Jagdgeschwader 1 (JG 1—1st Fighter Wing) on 1 May 1939.

With this unit he participated in the invasion of Poland in 1939. He surrender command of the Gruppe on 1 February 1940 and was transferred to the Reichsluftfahrtministerium. He briefly led Jagdgeschwader 27 (JG 27—27th Fighter Wing) on the Channel Front from 11 October to 22 October 1940, replacing Oberst Max Ibel before handing over command to Major Wolfgang Schellmann. He was then made Geschwaderkommodore (wing commander) of Jagdgeschwader 77 (JG 77—77th Fighter Wing) on 2 January 1941. Under his command, JG 77 participated in the Balkans Campaign and claimed 27 aerial victories for the loss of six pilots, five killed in action and one further wounded. In total, 26 aircraft sustained various degrees of damage, 14 aircraft were classified with 60–100% damage, 9 with 30–60% damage, and 3 with 10–30% damage. During the invasion of Crete, JG 77 pilots claimed 24 aerial victories for the loss of 11 pilots, three killed in action, five became prisoners of war and three were injured. JG 77 also suffered material losses with 22 aircraft sustaining 60–100% damage, 2 with 30–60% damage, and 3 with 10–30% damage.

=== War against the Soviet Union ===
In preparation for Operation Barbarossa, the German invasion of the Soviet Union, the Geschwaderstab (headquarters unit) of JG 77 relocated to a makeshift airfield at Bacău, west of the Siret River. On 23 June 1941, Woldenga transferred command of JG 77 to Majar Gotthard Handrick. Schellmann, the commander of JG 27, had been killed in action the day before. In consequence, Woldenga was given command of JG 27 which was based at Sobolewo. On 25 June, the Geschwaderstab relocated to Vilnius. That day, Woldenga claimed a Tupolev SB bomber shot down north-northeast of Vilnius. On 5 July, Woldenga was awarded the Knight's Cross of the Iron Cross (Ritterkreuz des Eisernen Kreuzes). He claimed his second aerial victory on 3 September, an I-18 fighter, an early German designation for a Mikoyan-Gurevich MiG-1 fighter, near Markovo in the Novgorod Oblast. A week later, Woldenga claimed another I-18 shot down followed by a third I-18 on 16 September southeast of Staraya Russa, taking his total to four aerial victories claimed.

On 15 October, the Geschwaderstab and III. Gruppe were withdrawn from the Eastern Front and moved to Döberitz, located approximately 10 kilometers (6.2 miles) west of Staaken, where they were reequipped with the Messerschmitt Bf 109 F-4 trop for future deployment in the North African campaign. While fighting on the Eastern Front, pilots of JG 27 under the leadership of Woldenga had claimed 806 aerial victories.

=== North Africa ===
On 10 December 1941, Woldenga relocated the Geschwaderstab to North Africa where they were initially based at Timimi before relocating to Martuba on 12 December. He was appointed Fliegerführer Balkan on 10 June 1942. His last service position of the war was commander of the Luftkriegschule 10 in Fürstenwalde near Berlin.

== Awards ==
- Iron Cross (1939) 2nd and 1st class
- Knight's Cross of the Iron Cross on 5 July 1941 as Major and Geschwaderkommodore of Jagdgeschwader 77

Military offices
Preceded by Oberstleutnant Max Ibel	Acting Commander of Jagdgeschwader 27 Afrika; 11 October 1940 – 22 October 1940	Succeeded by Major Wolfgang Schellmann
Preceded by Major Wolfgang Schellmann	Commander of Jagdgeschwader 27 Afrika; 22 June 1941 – 10 April 1942	Succeeded by Oberstleutnant Eduard Neumann
Preceded by Oberstleutnant Eitel Roediger von Manteuffel	Commander of Jagdgeschwader 77 Herz As; 22 December 1940 – 23 June 1941	Succeeded by Major Gotthard Handrick
Preceded by none	Commander of Jagdfliegerführer Rumänien; July 1943 – June 1944	Succeeded by Hauptmann Wolfgang Falck
