= Joachim Schlichting =

German Spanish Civil War and World War II flying ace

- Schlichting as a Hauptmann
- Born: 1 February 1914; Kassel, Germany
- Died: 7 July 1982 (aged 68); Basel, Switzerland
- Relatives: Erhard Milch (father in law)
- Military career
- Allegiance: Nazi Germany; West Germany
- Branch: Luftwaffe; German Air Force
- Service years: –1972
- Rank: Major (Wehrmacht); Oberst (Bundeswehr)
- Units: Condor Legion; JG 27
- Conflicts: Spanish Civil War World War II: Battle of France; Battle of Britain
- Awards: Knight's Cross of the Iron Cross

Joachim Schlichting (1 February 1914 – 7 July 1982) was a German aviator in the Luftwaffe during the Spanish Civil War and World War II. He was a recipient of the Knight's Cross of the Iron Cross of Nazi Germany.

== Career ==
Schlichtung was born on 1 February 1914 in Kassel, at the time in the Province of Hesse-Nassau, a province of the Kingdom of Prussia within the German Empire. He joined the pre-war Luftwaffe, and served with the Condor Legion during the Spanish Civil War. There, he served as Staffelkapitän (squadron leader) of 2. Staffel of Jagdgruppe 88 (J/88—88th Fighter Group) from 6 September 1937 to 28 May 1938. For his service in Spain, he was awarded the Spanish Cross in Gold with Swords and Diamonds (Spanienkreuz in Gold mit Schwertern und Brillanten) upon his return on 6 June 1938. Schlichting joined the Lehrgeschwader 2 in November 1938, with which he took part in the Invasion of Poland in September 1939.

On 1 November 1939, Schlichting was transferred and made Geschwaderadjutant, the adjutant of the newly formed Jagdgeschwader 27 (JG 27—27th Fighter Wing) under Geschwaderkommodore Max Ibel. He was promoted again on 1 February 1940, to lead I./Jagdgeschwader 1 as Gruppenkommandeur. In the campaign against France he shot down a Bristol Blenheim on 12 May and a LeO 45 on 6 June. At the end of the campaign (on 5 July) the unit was redesignated III./JG 27. In the Battle of Britain he claimed his 8th victory (a Spitfire of 152 Squadron; S/L P. Devitt returned to base, damaged) over Portland on 25 July 1940.

On 6 September 1940, Schlichting was shot down in his Messerschmitt Bf 109 E-4 (Werknummer 1380—factory number) near Shoeburyness. He was flying a bomber escort mission attacking Thameshaven when his aircraft experienced engine problems. Forced to turn back, he came under attack by Royal Air Force (RAF) fighters from either No. 41 or No. 222 Squadron. He baled out near the Shoeburyness artillery ranges and was taken prisoner by the British forces.

The presentation of the Knight's Cross of the Iron Cross (Ritterkreuz des Eisernen Kreuzes) was made over a year later on 31 October 1941 in British captivity. In late November, he was promoted to Major (major).

His 8 victories came in over 100 combat missions. After World war II he joined the Bundeswehr of the Federal Republic of Germany and served as the Chief of Staff of the 5. Luftwaffendivision (5th Air Division of the Bundeswehr) in 1963.

== Summary of career ==
=== Aerial victory claims ===
According to US historian David T. Zabecki, Schlichting was credited with eight aerial victories, five of which during the Spanish Civil War.

Chronicle of aerial victories
Claim	Date	Time	Type	Location	Claim	Date	Time	Type	Location
Spanish Civil War
– 2. Staffel of Jagdgruppe 88 – Spanish Civil War — September 1937 – March 1938
1	23 September 1937	—	I-16		4	21 February 1938	—	I-16	
2	29 November 1937	—	I-16		5	10 March 1938	—	I-16	
3	7 February 1938	—	I-16						
World War II
– I. Gruppe of Jagdgeschwader 1 – Battle of France — 10 May – 25 June 1940
1	12 May 1940	—	Blenheim	vicinity of Maastricht	2	6 June 1940	—	LeO 451	Roye
– III. Gruppe of Jagdgeschwader 27 – At the Channel and over England — 26 June 1940 – 6 September 1940
3	25 July 1940	13:20	Spitfire	south of Portland					

=== Awards ===
- Spanish Cross in Gold with Swords and Diamonds (6 June 1939)
- Iron Cross (1939) 2nd and 1st Class
- Knight's Cross of the Iron Cross on 14 December 1940 Hauptmann and Gruppenkommandeur of the III./Jagdgeschwader 27

Military offices
Preceded by Oberleutnant Günther Lützow	Squadron Leader of 2.J/88; 6 September 1937 – 28 May 1938	Unknown
Preceded by Fritz Schleif	Squadron Leader of 2(le.J)/LG Greifswald; 1 July 1938 – 1 November 1938	Succeeded by renamed 2.(J)/LG 2
Preceded by new	Squadron Leader of 2.(J)/LG 2; 1 November 1938 – 1 November 1939	Succeeded by Oberleutnant Friedrich von Wangerov
Preceded by Major Bernhard Woldenga	Group Commander of I./JG 1; 13 February 1940 – 5 July 1940	Succeeded by renamed III./JG 27
Preceded by new	Group Commander of III./JG 27; 5 July 1940 – 6 September 1940	Succeeded by Hptm Max Dobislav
