= Emil Clade =

Emil Josef Clade
- Born: 26 February 1916; Hambach, Neustadt an der Weinstraße
- Died: 31 May 2010 (aged 94)
- Military career
- Allegiance: Nazi Germany
- Branch: Luftwaffe
- Service years: 1936–1945
- Rank: Hauptmann
- Unit: JG 27
- Commands: I./JG 27
- Conflicts: Battle of France; Mediterranean Theatre; Operation Bodenplatte

Emil Josef Clade (26 February 1916 – May 2010) was a Luftwaffe fighter ace in World War II, and figured in German civilian aviation after the war. Enlisting in the Luftwaffe in 1937, prior to World War II, Clade served throughout the war as a fighter pilot in the Western and African fronts. Clade is credited with either 26 or 27 aircraft kills, and was shot down himself six times. He commanded the flight that shot down the transport of British Lieutenant General William Gott, the newly appointed Commander of the British 8th Army.

== Early life ==
Clade was born in Hambach, now part of Neustadt an der Weinstraße in Rheinland-Pfalz. After completing his schooling, he originally trained to become a merchant. However, he became interested in aviation in 1934, and became a glider pilot, participating in the German national civilian aviator's competition.

== Military career ==
Joining the Luftwaffe in April 1937, Clade was initially certified to fly the Junkers Ju 52. However, he quickly moved to become a fighter pilot.

== World War II ==
Clade served with 1./JG 1, flying the Messerschmitt Bf 109. He scored his first kill on 11 May 1940 near Maastricht, Netherlands against a Belgian Air Force Gloster Gladiator biplane of 1/I/2. On the evening of the same day, he claimed a French LeO 451 twin-engine bomber of GB I/12 or GB II/12, also in the Maastricht area. Victories over an RAF Spitfire and Morane MS.406 followed in May and June 1940. Encountering Supermarine Spitfires for the first time over Dunkirk, Clade was impressed saying that the British fighters were almost the Germans' equals. During the Battle of Britain, Clade flew approximately 80 combat missions over Britain.

In March 1941, Clade was made an instructor attached to Jagdgeschwader 27 into which 1./JG 1 had been merged, and stayed with this fighter unit for essentially all his remaining wartime career.

By now an oberfeldwebel, Clade was assigned to the Mediterranean theatre with 5./JG 27, operating from bases in North Africa alongside legendary "Star of Africa" Hans-Joachim Marseille. On 7 August 1942, he indirectly made a potentially decisive impact on the future course of the African campaign, although he was most likely unaware of the fact at the time. Airborne over the desert south of Alexandria in Egypt, he chanced upon a Bristol Bombay transport of No. 216 Squadron RAF, flown by 19-year-old Sergeant Pilot H.E. 'Jimmy' James, who was flying Lieutenant General William Gott, the newly appointed Commander of the British 8th Army, to a staff meeting in Cairo. The plane was also carrying a number of wounded British soldiers. Clade's attack forced the transport to crash land and the subsequent strafing run by fellow JG 27 pilot Bernd Schneider killed Gott and most other British troops inside the wreckage on the ground.

While still flying in Egypt, having been promoted to Leutnant, Clade recorded his 10th air claim on 5 July 1942 when he shot down an RAF Spitfire fighter near El-Daba. With 17 air victories to his credit, Clade was appointed Staffelkapitän of 7./JG 27 on 23 May 1943.

By January 1945, Clade was acting Gruppenkommandeur of III./JG 27, and lead the Gruppe in combat in Operation Bodenplatte. Clade led the gruppe an escort mission against Utrecht. In a subsequent airfield attack against Melsbroek, Clade said the AAA positions were not manned, and aircraft were bunched together or in lines, which made perfect targets. The attack caused considerable damage among the units based there and was a great success. The Recce Wings had lost two entire squadrons worth of machines. No. 69 Squadron RAF lost 11 Vickers Wellingtons and two damaged. No. 140 Squadron RAF lost four Mosquitoes, the losses being made good the same day. At least five Spitfires from No. 16 Squadron RAF were destroyed. No. 271 Squadron RAF lost at least seven Harrow transports "out of action". A further 15 other aircraft were destroyed. 139 Wing reported five B-25s destroyed and five damaged. Some 15 to 20 USAAF bombers were also destroyed. Another source states that 13 Wellingtons were destroyed, as were five Mosquitoes, four Auster and five Avro Ansons from the Tactical Air Forces 2nd Communications Squadron. Three Spitfires were also lost and two damaged. At least one RAF Transport Command Douglas Dakota was destroyed. The pilots of JG 27 and 54 claimed 85 victories and 40 damaged. German reconnaissance was able to confirm 49. JG 27 suffered unacceptable losses; 17 Bf 109s, 11 pilots killed, one wounded and three captured. IV./JG 54 lost two killed and one captured. Three Fw 190s were lost and one damaged.

Clade and his fellow Gruppenkommandeur Peter Werfft disbanded the remainder of their unit near Saalbach between 3 May and 8 May 1945 and became prisoners of war. Clade finished the war as with the rank of Hauptmann, and was credited with 27 victories, including two four-engine bombers. Nine claims were made over the Western Front, with the remainder being in North Africa.

Clade was himself shot down six times, including in aerial combat on 5 October 1943 (during a mission resulting in his 18th victory), on 26 November 1944 and on 25 February 1945 (immediately after his 27th and last air kill). He also sustained severe injuries in a Resistance attack on 16 February 1944 when he was serving in France near Avignon.

== Postwar career ==
Clade survived in various minor jobs after his release from a prisoner of war camp. He applied to become a civilian pilot with the newly formed Lufthansa in 1956 but was turned down because he exceeded the age limit by two years. However, he continued as a private aviator, was successful in various German competitions, and helped setting up local aviation associations.

In 1996 he published his memoirs of his service in the war.

He died in 2010, at the age of 94.

== Awards ==
- German Cross in Gold
- Iron Cross 1st Class
