= Alfred Price (author) =

British author (1936-2017)

- Born: 1936
- Died: 29 January 2017 (aged 80–81)
- Education: Loughborough University
- Occupation: Writer
- Writing career
- Genre: Non-fiction
- Subject: Aviation

Alfred Price FRHistS (1936 – January 29, 2017) was an author on aviation and related topics. He wrote over 40 books and 200 magazine articles.

== Early life and education ==
Price served in the Royal Air Force (RAF) as an Air Electronics Officer (AEO).

In the Royal Air Force he flew in the V-bomber force and specialised in electronic warfare. Over 15 years he flew over 4,000 flying hours.

Price received a PhD in history from Loughborough University.

== Writing Career ==
After his retirement from the air force, Price wrote extensively on aviation and military topics and over 40 of his books were published. As a result, he became a Fellow of the Royal Historical Society.

== Selected works ==
- Pictorial History of the Luftwaffe 1933-1945. London: Allan, 1969. ISBN 0711001006
- Focke Wulf 190 at War. New York: Scribner, 1977. ISBN 0684153238
- Instruments of Darkness: The History of Electronic Warfare. London: Macdonald and Jane's, 1977. ISBN 035401062X
- Battle of Britain 18 August 1940: The Hardest Day. London: Macdonald and Jane's, 1979. ISBN 0586036539
- The Spitfire Story. London: Jane's, 1982. ISBN 0867206241
- Air Battle Central Europe. New York: Warner Books, 1990. ISBN 0446360473
- The Last Year of the Luftwaffe, May 1944 to May 1945. London: Arms and Armour, 1993. ISBN 1854091891
- Late Marque Spitfire Aces: 1942-45. London: Osprey, 1995. ISBN 1855325756
- Spitfire Mark V Aces, 1941-45. London: Osprey Aerospace, 1997. ISBN 1855326353
- Sky Battles!: Dramatic Air Warfare Actions. London: Cassell, 1998, 1993. ISBN 0304351032
- Targeting the Reich: Allied Photographic Reconnaissance Over Europe, 1939-1945. London: Greenhill, 2003. ISBN 1853675466
- Battle Over the Reich: The Strategic Air Offensive Over Germany. Hersham: Classic, 2005. ISBN 1903223474
- Luftwaffe: Birth, Life and death of an air force. New York: Ballantine, 1970. ISBN 0345278976

== Death and legacy ==
He was diagnosed with Parkinson's disease and died on January 29, 2017.
