= Carquebut =

- Part of Sainte-Mère-Église
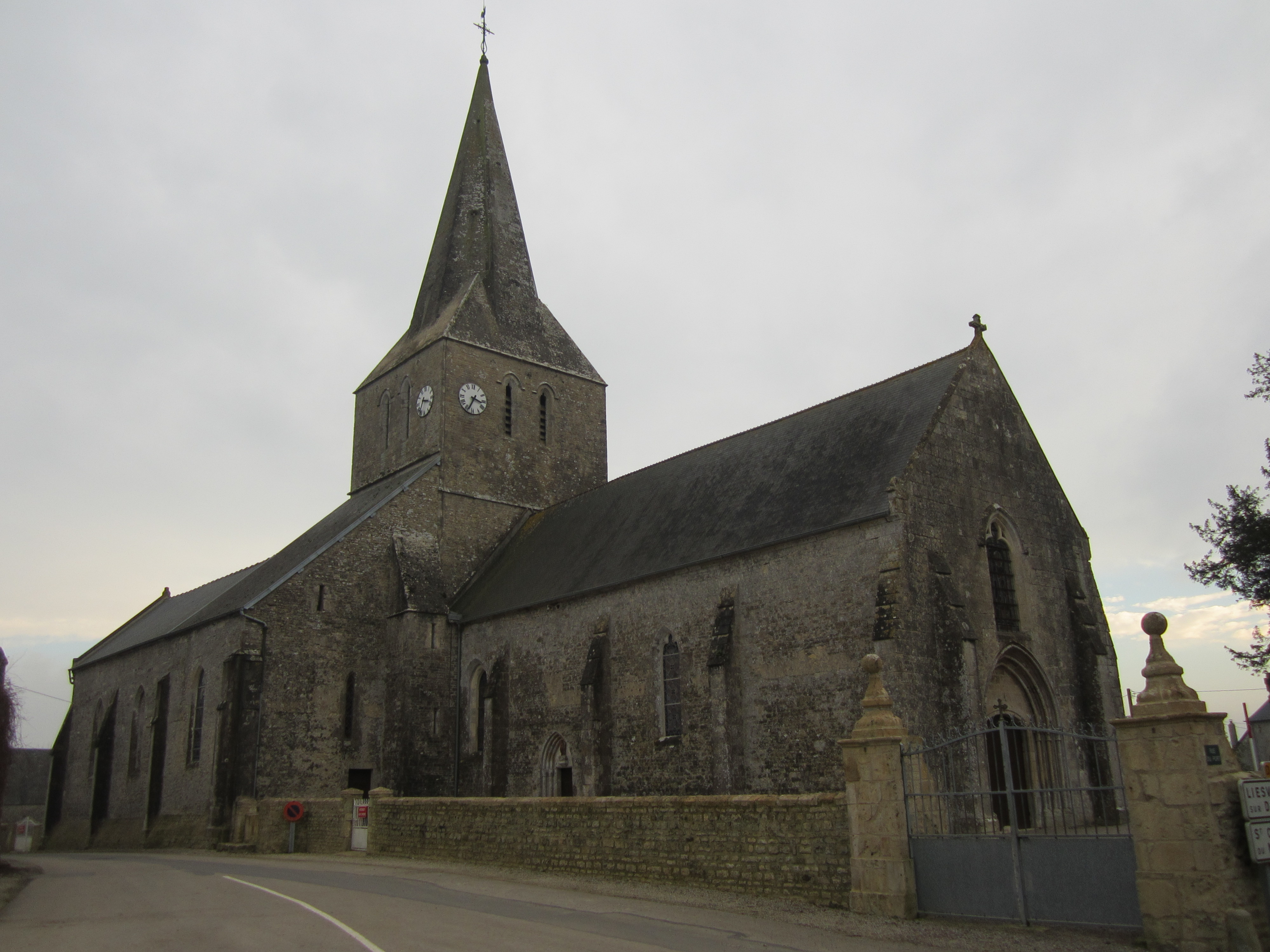
- The church of Saint-Ouen
- Location of Carquebut
- Location within France Location within Normandy
- Coordinates: 49°22′24″N 1°19′43″W
- Country: France
- Region: Normandy
- Department: Manche
- Arrondissement: Cherbourg
- Canton: Carentan
- Commune: Sainte-Mère-Église
- Area^{1}: 8.54 km^{2} (3.30 sq mi)
- Elevation: 22 m (72 ft)
- Highest elevation: 34 m (112 ft)
- Lowest elevation: 2 m (6.6 ft)
- Population (2022): 297
  - Density: 34.8/km^{2} (90.1/sq mi)
- Time zone: UTC+01:00 (CET)
  - Summer (DST): UTC+02:00 (CEST)
- Postal code: 50480
- ^{1} French Land Register data, which excludes lakes, ponds, glaciers > 1 km^{2} (0.386 sq mi or 247 acres) and river estuaries.

Carquebut (French pronunciation: [kaʁkəby]) is a former commune in the Manche department in Normandy in north-western France. On 1 January 2019, it was merged into the commune Sainte-Mère-Église.

== See also ==
- Communes of the Manche department
