= Hans Remmer =

German World War II fighter pilot

- Born: 17 August 1920; Freiburg im Breisgau, Germany
- Died: 2 April 1944 (aged 23); Graz, Nazi Germany
- Military career
- Allegiance: Nazi Germany
- Branch: Luftwaffe
- Rank: Hauptmann (captain)
- Unit: JG 27
- Commands: 1./JG 27
- Conflicts: See battles World War II: North African Campaign; Allied invasion of Sicily; Defense of the Reich †
- Awards: Knight's Cross of the Iron Cross

Hans Remmer (17 August 1920 – 2 April 1944) was a German Luftwaffe military aviator during World War II, a fighter ace credited with 27 aerial victories—that is, 27 aerial combat encounters resulting in the destruction of the enemy aircraft. All of his victories were claimed over the Western Allies and included eight four-engined heavy bombers.

Born in Freiburg im Breisgau, Remmer was trained as a fighter pilot and posted to Jagdgeschwader 27 (JG 27—27th Fighter Wing) in early 1941. His fought in the North African Campaign where he claimed his first aerial victory on 17 June 1941 during the Siege of Tobruk. In November 1942, Remmer was appointed Staffelkapitän (squadron leader) of 1. Staffel (1st squadron) of JG 27. In early 1943, his unit was relocated to the Western Front in France. He then fought in defense of the Reich against the United States Army Air Forces (USAAF) heavy bombers. On 2 April 1944, Remmer was killed in action near Graz when his parachute failed to open after he was shot down by USAAF fighters. Posthumously, he was awarded the Knight's Cross of the Iron Cross on 9 June 1944.

== Career ==
Remmer was born on 17 August 1920 in Freiburg im Breisgau, at the time in the Republic of Baden of the Weimar Republic. Following flight training, (Note: Flight training in the Luftwaffe progressed through the levels A1, A2 and B1, B2, referred to as A/B flight training. A training included theoretical and practical training in aerobatics, navigation, long-distance flights and dead-stick landings. The B courses included high-altitude flights, instrument flights, night landings and training to handle the aircraft in difficult situations.) he was transferred to the Ergänzungsstaffel (Training/Supplement Squadron) of Jagdgeschwader 27 (JG 27—27th Fighter Wing) on 2 January 1941.

=== North Africa ===
Following Operation Marita, the German invasion of Greece, the air elements of JG 27 briefly moved to Munich-Riem Airfield before they transferred to North Africa, arriving in Ayn al-Ġazāla between 18 and 22 April 1941. Remmer became a member of 1. Staffel (1st squadron) of JG 27 under the command of Oberleutnant Karl-Wolfgang Redlich. The squadron was subordinated to I. Gruppe (1st group) of JG 27 headed by Hauptmann Eduard Neumann. On 15 June, British forces launched Operation Battleaxe, an offensive to raise the Siege of Tobruk and re-capture eastern Cyrenaica. On 17 June, the offensive ended without reaching its objectives. The next day, the Royal Air Force (RAF) attacked the road from Fort Capuzzo to Al Adm and Tobruk. A flight from 1. Staffel bounced these aircraft and Remmer claimed his first aerial victory when he shot down east of Sallum what was claimed to be a Brewster F2A Buffalo, but was probably a Curtiss P-40 Warhawk, as no Buffalos were deployed in North Africa. (Note: Initially, the Luftwaffe referred to the Curtiss P-40 Warhawk fighter as "Brewster" before they started referring to them as "Curtiss".) On 26 August, he claimed his second aerial victory over a Hawker Hurricane north of Sidi Barrani

JG 27 insignia

In late October, I. Gruppe was reequipped with the Messerschmitt Bf 109 F-4/trop. To retain operation status, 1. and 3. Staffel left North Africa on 22 October while 2. Staffel stayed. In Italy they handed over their Bf 109 E variants and continued the journey back home by train. The pilots were sent on a short home-leave before returning to Ayn al-Ġazāla on 10 November. Following the reequipment, Remmer claimed a Vickers Wellington bomber shot down on 21 November east of Sidi Omar, his third aerial victory. He then claimed a Hurricane south of Al Adm on 27 November and a Bristol Blenheim bomber east of Ayn al-Ġazāla the following day. On 5 December, 1. Staffel was placed under the command of Oberleutnant Ludwig Franzisket when Redlich was transferred. Two days later, I. Gruppe had to withdraw and relocated to an airfield at Timimi. That day, Remmer claimed a Douglas A-20 Havoc bomber, also known as "Boston", south of Al Adm.

Remmer claimed his first aerial victory in 1942, his ninth in total, on 13 June when he shot down a Hurricane northeast of Al Adm. (Note: On this mission, I./JG 27 claimed three P-40s and two Hurricanes near El Adem/Gazala. Oberleutnant Hans-Joachim Marseille claimed four and Remmer one. These were P-40s from No. 450 Squadron RAAF; no Hurricanes were involved and only four aircraft were lost but another South African aircraft sustained heavy damage and crash-landed at base. Flight Sergeant Bill Halliday (AL127) and Flight Sergeant Roy Stone (RAF) in AK952 were both killed in action. Pilot Officer Osborne (AL106) crash landed and was picked up by the army.) He was credited with his tenth aerial victory on 10 August when he claimed a Blenheim southeast of Abu Dweis. That day, Remmer and his wingman escorted a Messerschmitt Bf 110 fighter on an aerial reconnaissance mission when they encountered a single aircraft near Abu Dweis. It is assumed that the aircraft was misidentified and may have been the Martin Baltimore AG737 bomber from the RAF No. 1437 (Strategic Reconnaissance) Flight.

On 1 November, Remmer was appointed Staffelkapitän (squadron leader) of 1. Staffel of JG 27. He succeeded Franzisket who had been wounded on 31 October. The next day during the Second Battle of El Alamein, Remmer claimed his 15th and last aerial victory in North Africa. In aerial combat with about 20 Curtiss P-40 Warhawk fighters southeast of Fuka, pilots of I. Gruppe claimed four P-40s shot down including one by Remmer. The Gruppe was withdrawn from North Africa on 11 November and began relocating back to Germany.

=== Western Front ===
Following the withdrawal from North Africa, I. Gruppe returned to Germany where they were based at Krefeld Airfield. Both pilots and ground personnel then went on home-leave. On 2 January 1943, the Gruppe was ordered to relocate to Évreux Airfield located northwest of Paris. Here, the Gruppe was replenished with new pilots who lacked any combat experience. The Gruppe also received ten factory new Bf 109 G-4 aircraft followed by further nineteen aircraft in February. On 31 January, I. Gruppe without its 2. Staffel moved to the airfield at Bernay located southwest of Rouen. The following three weeks were spent with training and familiarization with the Bf 109 G-4 which had significant problems with engine overheating. On 20 February, I. Gruppe reported operational readiness and was then subordinated to Jagdgeschwader 2 (JG 2—2nd Fighter Wing). Tasked with patrolling the area of the Seine estuary up to Dieppe in the east and the Cotentin Peninsula in the west, the Gruppe faced the RAF during the Circus offensive as well as the first appearances of the United States Army Air Forces (USAAF) heavy bombers.

On 14 April, I. Gruppe moved to an airfield near Poix-de-Picardie, located southwest of Amiens. A week later, on 21 April, Lockheed Ventura medium bombers from No. 21 Squadron attacked the Abbeville railroad yards. In this encounter, Remmer was credited with the destruction of one Ventura bomber. On 13 May, 169 USAAF Boeing B-17 Flying Fortress bombers, escorted by fighter aircraft, attacked the Potez manufacturing sites at Albert and the Luftwaffe airfields near Saint-Omer. At 16:15, I. Gruppe intercepted a formation of B-17 bombers heading for Albert near Abbeville. In this aerial battle, Remmer claimed his 17th aerial victory and first heavy bomber when he shot down a B-17 southeast of Doullens.

In early June 1943, I. Gruppe of JG 27 moved to the airfield at Marignane, present-day the Marseille Provence Airport. Here, Remmer temporarily led I. Gruppe after its former commander Hauptmann Erich Hohagen had been wounded. On 15 July, command of the Gruppe officially passed to Hauptmann Franzisket. At Marignane, I. Gruppe was subordinated to Jagdfliegerführer Südfrankreich (Fighter Leader Southern France) commanded by Oberst Friedrich Vollbracht and equipped with the Bf 109 G-4 and G-6. Until their relocation to Münster-Handorf Airfield in late July, the Gruppe trained and prepared for action in defense of the Reich.

=== Defense of the Reich and death ===
The air elements of I. Gruppe arrived at Münster-Handorf on 29 July followed by the ground personnel on 3 August. The aircraft were then equipped with the 20 mm MG 151/20 underwing gun pod to better effectively combat the USAAF heavy bombers. The Gruppe flew its first combat mission in defense of the Reich on 12 August. That day, the USAAF VIII Bomber Command dispatched 330 B-17s from the 1st and 4th Bombardment Wing on a mission to Bochum, Gelsenkirchen, Recklinghausen and Bonn. Only 243 bombers reached the target area which was hidden under cloud coverage. In consequence, the bombers attacked targets of opportunity. At 08:45, I. Gruppe was scrambled and by means of Y-Control for fighters was vectored to a point of intercept near Remscheid. Over the next 45 minutes, I. Gruppe engaged the bombers, claiming five B-17s destroyed, including a B-17 shot down by Remmer south of Bonn. The Gruppe relocated from Münster-Handorf to an airfield at Fels am Wagram, located approximately 17 kilometers (11 miles) east-northeast of Krems an der Donau in Lower Austria, on 22 August. Here on 31 August, Remmer was awarded the German Cross in Gold (Deutsches Kreuz in Gold).

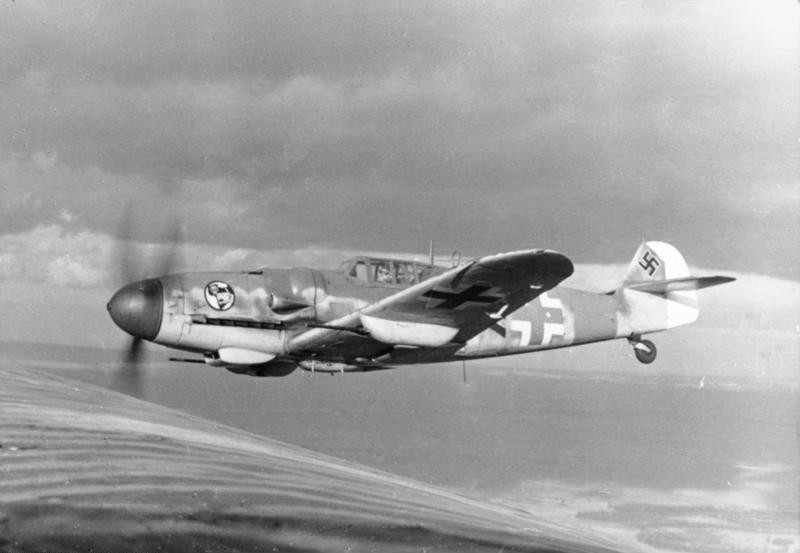
A JG 27 Bf 109 G-6 with two MG 151/20.

The Gruppe flew its first combat mission from Fels am Wagram on 1 October when the USAAF targeted the German aircraft industry. The heavy bomber formations attacked from the south, flying over the Alps, particularly aiming for the Wiener Neustadter Flugzeugwerk (WNF), the aircraft manufacturing site in Wiener Neustadt. At 12:10, 50 to 60 Consolidated B-24 Liberator bombers of the USAAF Twelfth Air Force approached the area of Agram, present-day Zagreb, Ödenburg, present-day Sopron, heading for Wiener Neustadt where they severely damaged the WNF factory. I. Gruppe intercepted this formation after the bomb run. Pilots of I. Gruppe claimed nine aerial victories of which five were confirmed, including a B-24 shot down by Remmer. On 2 November, the USAAF again targeted the WNF factory. At 12:30, I. Gruppe intercepted a USAAF bomber formation south of Wiener Neustadt. During an attack on a B-24, Remmer's Bf 109 G-6 (Werknummer 140138—factory number) was hit by defensive gun fire from the bomber. Forced to bail out near Neufeld an der Leitha, he was wounded in this combat.

On 20 February 1944, the USAAF and RAF Bomber Command launched Operation Argument, also known as "Big Week". As part of Operation Argument on 22 February, the USAAF Fifteenth Air Force targeted the Messerschmitt factories at Regensburg-Obertraubling and Prüfening. I. Gruppe took off at 12:20 and intercepted the bombers an hour later after they had completed their bomb run. In a head-on attack flown northeast of Graz, Remmer claimed his 20th aerial victory when he shot down a B-24. The next day, the USAAF Fifteenth Air Force bombed the ball bearing factories at Steyr. At 11:13, I. Gruppe took off from Fels am Wagram and intercepted the bombers near Steyr. In 20 minute aerial combat, Remmer claimed a B-24 and an escorting Lockheed P-38 Lightning fighter shot down southwest of Linz. On 25 February, the last day of Operation Argument, Remmer claimed three aerial victories. The USAAF again targeted the German aircraft industry in southern Germany. I. Gruppe was scrambled at 11:10 and intercepted the bombers of the Fifteenth Air Force near Klagenfurt at 12:00. In this engagement, Remmer claimed an Herausschuss (separation shot)—a severely damaged heavy bomber forced to separate from its combat box which was counted as an aerial victory—over a B-17 and the destruction of another B-17. Low on fuel, the Luftwaffe fighters landed at Graz for refueling. Later that day they returned to Fels am Wagram. On this shuttle flight, Remmer claimed a P-38 shot down for his 25th aerial victory.

On 18 March, Remmer and his wingman, Oberfähnrich Adolf Schreyer, lost their orientation due to electrical failure of Remmer's radio guidance system. This resulted in a forced landing near Cilli, present-day Celje located between Maribor and Ljubljana. At the time, Remmer was acting commander of I. Gruppe, replacing Franzisket who was on home-leave. The following day, the USAAF Fifteenth Air Force targeted the Steyr-Daimler-Puch factory at Steyr. The Gruppe led by Remmer intercepted a formation of 24 B-24 bombers near Klagenfurt. On this mission, Remmer claimed a B-24 shot down east of Marburg an der Drau, present-day Maribor. On 2 April, the USAAF Fifteenth Air Force again targeted the Steyr-Daimler-Puch. At 09:34, 32 Bf 109s from the Stab (headquarters unit) and I. Gruppe took off from Fels am Wagram. Near Bruck an der Mur at 10:25, Remmer ordered the attack on a B-24 formation. During this attack, four B-24s were shot down including one by Remmer, his 27th and last aerial victory. Shortly after, the Bf 109s came under attack by escorting P-38s west of Graz. Remmer's Bf 109 G-6 (Werknummer 411915) was hit and he radioed that he would attempt a forced landing. However, the terrain was unsuitable and he bailed out at low altitude, falling to his death near Deutschlandsberg. Command of 1. Staffel was then passed to Hauptmann Josef Jansen. Posthumously, Remmer was awarded the Knight's Cross of the Iron Cross (Ritterkreuz des Eisernen Kreuzes) on 9 June 1944.

== Summary of career ==
=== Aerial victory claims ===
According to Obermaier, Remmer was credited with 27 aerial victories, all of which claimed over the Western Allies in an unknown number of combat missions. Mathews and Foreman, authors of Luftwaffe Aces: Biographies and Victory Claims, researched the German Federal Archives and found records for 21 aerial victory claims, plus eight further unconfirmed claims. All of his aerial victories were claimed on the Western Front and include eight four-engined bombers.

Victory claims were logged to a map-reference (PQ = Planquadrat), for example "PQ 14 Ost S/JJ-4". The Luftwaffe grid map (Jägermeldenetz) covered all of Europe, western Russia and North Africa and was composed of rectangles measuring 15 minutes of latitude by 30 minutes of longitude, an area of about 360 square miles (930 km^{2}). These sectors were then subdivided into 36 smaller units to give a location area 3 km × 4 km (1.9 mi × 2.5 mi) in size.

Chronicle of aerial victories
This and the – (dash) indicates unconfirmed aerial victory claims for which Remmer did not receive credit. This along with the * (asterisk) indicates an Herausschuss (separation shot)—a severely damaged heavy bomber forced to separate from his combat box which was counted as an aerial victory. This and the ? (question mark) indicates information discrepancies listed by Prien, Balke, Stemmer, Rodeike, Bock, Mathews and Foreman.
Claim	Date	Time	Type	Location	Claim	Date	Time	Type	Location
– 1. Staffel of Jagdgeschwader 27 – Sicily, Balkans and North Africa — 4 December 1940 – 17 November 1941
1	18 June 1941	06:00	Brewster	east of Sallum	2? (Note: According to Mathews and Foreman, this claim is unconfirmed.)	26 August 1941	—	Hurricane	25 km (16 mi) north of Sidi Barrani
– 1. Staffel of Jagdgeschwader 27 – In North Africa — 18 November 1941 – 13 November 1942
3	21 November 1941	09:50	Wellington	east of Sidi Omar	—	7 August 1942	—	Hurricane	northwest of El Alamein
4	27 November 1941	16:20	Hurricane	south of Al Adm	10	10 August 1942	09:30	Blenheim	southeast of Abu Dweis
5	28 November 1941	15:00	Blenheim	east of Ain el Gazala	11?	28 August 1942	07:33	P-46	north of Abu Dweis
6	7 December 1941	10:15	Boston	south of Al Adm	12	1 September 1942	11:12	P-40	southeast of El Alamein
7	20 December 1941	09:35	P-40	west of Marawa	13	3 September 1942	15:43	Hurricane	north of El Masra
8	23 December 1941	12:25	Maryland	northeast of Ajdabiya	14?	16 October 1942	—	Spitfire	La Valetta
9	13 June 1942	18:20	Hurricane	northeast of Al Adm	15	2 November 1942	05:40	P-40	southeast of Fuka
—	18 July 1942	—	Hurricane	Bir Mumin Busak					
– 1. Staffel of Jagdgeschwader 27 – On the Western Front — 1 February – 29 July 1943
16	21 April 1943	12:20	Ventura	25 km (16 mi) west of Le Crotoy	17	13 May 1943	16:20	B-17	7 km (4.3 mi) southeast of Doullens
– 1. Staffel of Jagdgeschwader 27 – Defense of the Reich — 29 July 1943 – 2 April 1944
18	12 August 1943	09:30	B-17	Kessenich, south of Bonn	23	25 February 1944	12:01	B-17* (Note: In the 1998 book by Prien, Rodeike and Stemmer, this aerial victory is listed as an Herausschuss (separation shot). In the 2019 book by Prien, Balke, Stemmer and Bock, this claim is listed as a normal aerial victory.)	PQ 14 Ost S/JJ-4 /JH-8
19	1 October 1943	13:06	B-24	35 km (22 mi) south-southwest of Wiener Neustadt	24?	25 February 1944	12:10	B-17	PQ 14 Ost S/HH
20	22 February 1944	13:40	B-24	PQ 14 Ost S/EL-HM, northeast of Graz	25?	25 February 1944	13:42	P-38	PQ 14 Ost S/GJ
21	23 February 1944	12:11	B-24	southwest of Linz	26	19 March 1944	13:50	B-24	east of Marburg an der Drau
22?	23 February 1944	12:25	P-38	west-southwest of Linz	27	2 April 1944	10:32	B-24	PQ 14 Ost S/HK, west of Graz

=== Awards ===
- Iron Cross (1939) 2nd and 1st Class
- Honor Goblet of the Luftwaffe on 1 July 1942 as Leutnant and pilot
- German Cross in Gold on 31 August 1943 as Oberleutnant in the I./Jagdgeschwader 27
- Knight's Cross of the Iron Cross on 9 June 1944 as Hauptmann and Staffelkapitän of the 1./Jagdgeschwader 27

== Notes ==
Military offices
Preceded by Hauptmann Erich Hohagen	Acting Gruppenkommandeur of II./JG 27; 1 June 1943 – 15 July 1943	Succeeded by Hauptmann Ludwig Franzisket
