= Ludwig Franzisket =

German World War II fighter pilot and zoologist (1917–1988)

Prof. Dr. Ludwig Franzisket
- Franzisket as an Oberleutnant
- Born: 26 June 1917; Düsseldorf
- Died: 23 November 1988 (aged 71); Münster
- Military career
- Allegiance: Nazi Germany
- Branch: Luftwaffe
- Service years: 1937–1945
- Rank: Major (major)
- Units: Jagdgeschwader 26; Jagdgeschwader 1
- Commands: Jagdgeschwader 27
- Conflicts: See battles World War II: Invasion of Poland; Battle of France; Battle of Britain; Kanalkampf; North African Campaign; Defense of the Reich; second Schweinfurt raid
- Awards: Knight's Cross of the Iron Cross
- Scientific career
- Education: University of Münster
- Fields: Biology
- Workplaces: Director of the Westphalian Museum of Natural History
- Doctoral advisor: Bernhard Rensch

Ludwig Franzisket (26 June 1917 – 23 November 1988) was a German Luftwaffe military aviator and wing commander during World War II. As a fighter ace, he is credited with 43 aerial victories claimed in over 500 combat missions. A flying ace or fighter ace is a military aviator credited with shooting down five or more enemy aircraft during aerial combat. He claimed all his aerial victories over the Western Allies while flying the Messerschmitt Bf 109. He was also a recipient of the Knight's Cross of the Iron Cross. After the war, he became a professor and director of the Westfälisches Museum für Naturkunde.

== Early life and military career ==
Franzisket was born on 26 June 1917 in Düsseldorf, at the time in the Rhine Province, the westernmost province of the Kingdom of Prussia within the German Empire. He had a younger brother Max, born on 22 August 1918 in Düsseldorf, who was killed in action as a Hauptmann and commander of the I. Gruppe (1st group) of Zerstörergeschwader 1 (ZG 1—1st Destroyer Wing) on 19 July 1943 on the Eastern Front. Franzisket, attended schools in Berlin, Minden and graduated in Münster with his Abitur (diploma) in 1936.

In 1937, Franzisket volunteered for military service in the Luftwaffe. Following completion of flight and fighter pilot training, (Note: Flight training in the Luftwaffe progressed through the levels A1, A2 and B1, B2, referred to as A/B flight training. A training included theoretical and practical training in aerobatics, navigation, long-distance flights and dead-stick landings. The B courses included high-altitude flights, instrument flights, night landings and training to handle the aircraft in difficult situations.) Franzisket initially served with Jagdgeschwader 26 (JG 26—26th Fighter Wing) from 1938, and then transferred 1. Staffel (1st squadron) of Jagdgeschwader 1 (JG 1—1st Fighter Wing) on the 1 August 1939.

== World War II ==
World War II in Europe began on Friday, 1 September 1939, when German forces invaded Poland. In preparation for the invasion I. Gruppe of JG 1 had moved to airfields at Schippenbeil, present-day Sępopol, Heiligenbeil, present-day Mamonovo, and Arys-Rostken, present-day Orzysz, in East Prussia. Here, the Gruppe was subordinated to Luftflotte 1 (Air Fleet 1) under command of General der Flieger Albert Kesselring. On 6 September, the Gruppe was withdrawn from Poland and ordered to Lübeck-Blankensee and then on 15 September to an airfield at Vörden, located approximately 20 kilometers (12 miles) north of Osnabrück, where the unit stayed until January 1940. There, the Gruppe flew fighter protection during the "Phoney War" on the German border to the Netherlands.

In mid-January 1940, I. Gruppe was ordered to an airfield at Gymnich, today part of Erftstadt, where it patrolled Germany's western border. There, the Gruppe continuously conducted various flight exercises. In late April, the unit received the first Messerschmitt Bf 109 E-4 variant, replacing the Bf 109 E-3s.

=== Battle of France and Britain ===
The Wehrmacht launched the invasion of France and the Low Countries (Fall Gelb) on 10 May 1940. During this campaign, I. Gruppe of JG 1 was subordinated to the Geschwaderstab (headquarters unit) of Jagdgeschwader 27 (JG 27–27th Fighter Wing) which was under the control of VIII. Fliegerkorps (8th Air Corps) under the command of Generaloberst Wolfram Freiherr von Richthofen. The next day, Franzisket who then flew with 3. Staffel claimed his first two aerial victories. On an early morning mission to Maastricht, the Gruppe engaged in aerial combat with Belgian Gloster Gladiator fighters. During this encounter, the Gruppe claimed seven aerial victories, including one by Franzisket. Later that day, the Gruppe intercepted ten French Lioré et Olivier LeO 45 bombers escorted by two squadrons of Morane-Saulnier M.S.406 fighters. On this mission, Franzisket claimed one of the M.S.406 fighters shot down near Riemst.

JG 27 insignia

The second and decisive phase, Fall Rot (Case Red), of the Battle of France began on 5 June. I. Gruppe supported the German forces fighting at the Somme and Aisne. That day, Franzisket was credited with his last aerial victories of the Battle of France, claiming two LeO 45 medium bombers near Nesle and a M.S.406 fighter shot down near Roye. On 19 June, I. Gruppe relocated to Nevers. When the Armistice of 22 June 1940 was signed, Franzisket was credited with nine aerial victories and had been awarded the Iron Cross 2nd and 1st Class (Eisernes Kreuz zweiter und erster Klasse). In preparation for combat with the Royal Air Force (RAF) in what would become the Battle of Britain, I. Gruppe moved to an airfield at Plumetot, locate north of Caen on the English Channel, on 30 June. On 5 July, I. Gruppe of JG 1 was redesignated and integrated into JG 27, becoming the III. Gruppe of JG 27. Consequently, 1., 2. and 3. Staffel of JG 1 became the 7., 8. and 9. Staffel of JG 27 respectively.

Franzisket claimed his first aerial victory of the Battle of Britain on 11 July during a Kanalkampf mission over a Hawker Hurricane fighter south of Isle of Portland. On 8 August, I. Gruppe escorted Junkers Ju 87 dive bombers attacking Convoy CW 9 in the English Channel. That day, I. Gruppe pilots claimed nine aerial victories south of the Isle of Wight, including a Hurricane by Franzisket, for the loss of one of their own. By 8 September, his number of aerial victories claimed had increased to fourteen. On 1 October 1940, Franzisket was transferred and appointed Gruppen-Adjutant of I. Gruppe of JG 27, succeeding Oberleutnant Hans Bertram who was killed in action. The day before, I. Gruppe had received new orders, was withdrawn from the English Channel and had relocated to an airfield at Stade in Northern Germany. Here the Gruppe was subordinated to the Geschwaderstab of JG 1 and tasked with patrolling the German Bight. This assignment ended on 21 October, when the Gruppe was ordered to relocate to Dinan in northwestern France.

=== North Africa ===
On 3 December 1940, I. Gruppe was again withdrawn from the English Channel and relocated to Döberitz located approximately 10 kilometers (6.2 miles) west of Staaken. There, the pilots were sent on home leave, returning in January 1941. In February, the Gruppe began preparations for Operation Marita, the German invasion of Greece while the ground elements of the Gruppe began their relocation to Tripoli in North Africa, arriving there on 18 March. There, the ground crew began preparations for the air elements to arrive at the designated airfield at Ayn al-Ġazāla. In parallel, the air elements of I. Gruppe relocated to Munich-Riem Airfield in early March. There, the Gruppe received refurbished Bf 109 E-7 fighter aircraft. The aircraft had been equipped with a sand-filter on the front of the supercharger intake which made the aircraft more suitable for deployment in North Africa. On 4 April, the Gruppe was ordered to move to Graz Airfield for Operation Marita. German forces launched the attack on 6 April. The orders for I. Gruppe that day were to attack and destroy the Yugoslavian air defenses in the area of Laibach, present-day Ljubljana in Slovenia. At the time of his relocation to North Africa, Franzisket was credited with 14 aerial victories and one of the most successful fighter pilots within I. Gruppe of JG 27.

A notable success in this period occurred on 14 June 1941 when Franzisket intercepted and shot down South African ace Captain Kenneth Driver. The air battle was fought singularly, in a one-versus-one situation. Both men fired at each other, but only the German scored hits. Franzisket got too close and struck Driver's tail with a wing tip, damaging it. Franzisket remained ignorant of the collision, as did Driver, who was preparing to bail out, until after they met. Franzisket showed Driver around the damaged Bf 109. Driver showed Franzisket a picture and lock of hair belonging to his girlfriend who had come to visit him in Cairo. The German promised to have a message dropped via container over his airfield informing her that Driver lived. Franzisket was awarded the Knight's Cross of the Iron Cross (Ritterkreuz des Eisernen Kreuzes) on 20 July for 22 aerial victories claimed in 204 combat missions. After Oberleutnant Gerhard Homuth from 3. Staffel, and Oberleutnant Karl-Wolfgang Redlich, he was the third pilot within I. Gruppe of JG 27 to receive this distinction in North Africa.

Franzisket was appointed Staffelkapitän (squadron leader) of 1. Staffel JG 27 on 5 December 1941, succeeding Hauptmann Redlich who was transferred. On 21 March 1942, Franzisket claimed a Curtiss P-40 Warhawk fighter shot down north of Ayn al-Ġazāla. His opponent may have been Pilot Officer R.H. McKillop flying Kittyhawk I AK748 from No. 94 Squadron. On 29 October, Franzisket was shot down on a Ju 87 dive bomber escort mission. He managed to bail out of his Bf 109 G-2 trop (Werknummer 10616—factory number) in a location approximately 10 kilometers (6.2 miles) southeast of the Quotaifiyah Airfield Complex. His victor may have been Pilot Officer C.J. Samonelle from No. 92 Squadron. Franzisket, like his close friend Hans-Joachim Marseille, struck the vertical stabilizer breaking his leg. During his convalescence, he was awarded the German Cross in Gold (Deutsches Kreuz in Gold) on 12 January 1943.

Franzisket summed up his view of the air war over North Africa after the war:

In the air we were superior to the British fighter aircraft [Hurricanes] particularly in 1941. The Curtiss Tomahawks and Kittyhawks were much better aircraft, but the Bf 109F had the better performance at high altitude. Over and above, our tactics seemed to be better than the British, but on the other hand, the ever-growing superiority in numbers of the RAF was the reason why JG 27 was from the summer, 1942 onwards, more and more decimated and weakened. Negative points were the enormous technical difficulties and the lack of supply. An important but not decisive psychological factor was the news of the immense super-victories of the German pilots in Russia. But we all had the feeling that these victories were gained much more easily than ours. I never envied the German Jagdgeschwadern on the Channel front; I have a very unpleasant memory of my own tour of several months over England, and therefore had the highest respect for the results of the pilots on the Western front."

=== Group commander ===
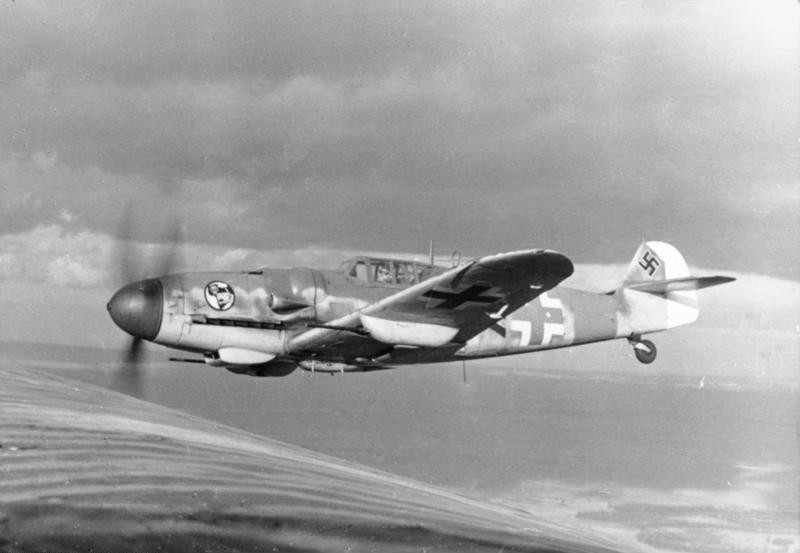
Messerschmitt Bf 109 G-6 of Jagdgeschwader 27 with two MG 151/20 under its wings. This aircraft was flown by Gruppenkommandeur Major Ludwig Franzisket in early 1944.

After recovering, from 1 July 1943, Franzisket led 1. Staffel of Ergänzungs-Jagdgruppe Süd, a supplementary training unit. On 15 July, he was then appointed Gruppenkommandeur (group commander) of I. Gruppe of JG 27. He succeeded Hauptmann Hans Remmer who had temporarily led the Gruppe since 1 June when the former commander Hauptmann Erich Hohagen had been wounded in combat. At the time, the Gruppe was based at Marignane Airfield located northwest of Marseille in southern France. There the Gruppe was training for defense of the Reich missions. In late July, the Gruppe moved to Münster-Handorf Airfield in Germany for combat operations against the United States Army Air Forces (USAAF). On 22 August, I. Gruppe relocated to an airfield at Fels am Wagram located approximately 17 kilometers (11 miles) east-northeast of Krems an der Donau, Austria. On 14 October during the second Schweinfurt raid at 12:44, I. Gruppe took off at Fels am Wagram and were vectored in a northwesterly direction and were refueled at Ansbach Airfield. At 14:35, the Gruppe was scrambled and vectored towards Schweinfurt. At 14:45, the Gruppe intercepted a formation of Boeing B-17 Flying Fortress heavy bombers in the area south-southeast of Schweinfurt. Franzisket, who led his Gruppe in the attack, claimed three B-17 bombers shot down.

Franzisket was promoted to Major (major) on 1 May 1944. That month, the Allies initiated the Oil Campaign of World War II, targeting various facilities supplying Germany with petroleum, oil, and lubrication products. On 12 May, the Eighth Air Force sent an attack force of 886 heavy bombers, protected by 980 escort fighters, against the German refineries in central Germany at Leuna, Merseburg, Böhlen and Zeitz. That day, Franzisket's Bf 109 G-6/U4 (Werknummer 441097) was shot down and severely wounded in combat with the bombers, forcing him to bail out near Frankfurt. Subsequently he surrendered command of I. Gruppe to Hauptmann Ernst Börngen.

=== Wing commander and end of war ===
On 15 December 1944, Franzisket joined the Geschwaderstab of JG 27. At the time, the Geschwaderstab was based at Rheine Airfield. On 30 December, Franzisket was appointed Geschwaderkommodore (wing commander), replacing Oberstleutnant Gustav Rödel who had been transferred to the 2. Jagd-Division (2nd Fighter Division). Due to advancing Allied forces, JG 27 retreated to Horn on 18 March 1945. On 30 March, JG 27 briefly moved to Helmstedt and then to Salzgitter two days later, to Breitenfeld on 8 April and to Rathenow on 11 April. Here in mid-April, JG 27 split into two groups, the "southern group" consisting of I. and III. Gruppe of JG 27, while the Geschwaderstab and II. Gruppe of JG 27 headed north, first to Schwerin and then to Leck on 30 April. Following the German surrender at Lüneburg Heath, the war ended for the Geschwaderstab on 5 May.

== Academic career ==
Following World War II in 1946, Franzisket attended the University of Münster where he studied biology, chemistry and physics. In 1950, he attained a Doctor of Philosophy (Latin: Doctor rerum naturalium abbreviated Dr. rer. nat.) in biology. In 1956, he became director of the Westphalian Museum of Natural History, succeeding Bernhard Rensch who had been his doctoral advisor. Franzisket also taught at the School of Education Westfalen-Lippe, which in 1980 was integrated into the University of Münster. From 1957 to 1975, he conducted multiple expeditions to the Red Sea, the Maldives, the Hawaiian Islands, and Samoa. On the first of these expeditions, he collaborated with Hans Hass. At the University of Hawaiʻi, he researched the nitrogen metabolism of reef corals. In 1970, Franzisket was made a professor for zoology and didactic methods in the field of biology.

Following his retirement in 1982, Franzisket together with Winfried Henke were involved in the creation of the Neanderthal Museum in Mettmann. Franzisket died aged 71 on 23 November 1988 in Münster, West Germany.

== Summary of career ==
=== Aerial victory claims ===
According to Obermaier, Franzisket was credited with 43 aerial victories claimed in over 500 combat missions. Authors Ring and Girbig also list him with 43 aeirial victories, including four four-engined heavy bombers. Mathews and Foreman, authors of Luftwaffe Aces: Biographies and Victory Claims, researched the German Federal Archives and found records for 39 aerial victory claims, plus four further unconfirmed claims. All of his aerial victories were claimed over the Western Allies on Western Front and North Africa, and includes three four-engined heavy bombers.

Chronicle of aerial victories
This and the – (dash) indicates unconfirmed aerial victory claims for which Franzisket did not receive credit. This and the ? (question mark) indicates information discrepancies listed by Prien, Stemmer, Rodeike, Bock, Mathews and Foreman.
| Claim | Date | Time | Type | Location | Claim | Date | Time | Type | Location |
– 3. Staffel of Jagdgeschwader 1? (Note: According to Mathews and Foreman claimed while flying with 1. Staffel of Jagdgeschwader 1.) – Battle of France — 10 May – 25 June 1940
| 1 | 11 May 1940 | 06:53 | Gladiator | vicinity of Maastricht | ? (Note: This claim is not listed by Prien, Stemmer, Rodeike and Bock.) | 23 May 1940 | 14:20 | Hurricane | Douai |
| 2? (Note: According to Mathews and Foreman, this claim is unconfirmed .) | 11 May 1940 | 19:55 | M.S.406 | Riemst | 6 | 23 May 1940 | 14:20? (Note: According to Mathews and Foreman claimed at 14:15.) | Hurricane | Douai |
| 3 | 17 May 1940 | 13:05 | Potez 63 | Laon | 7 | 5 June 1940 | 10:45? (Note: According to Mathews and Foreman claimed at 10:43.) | LeO 451 | Nesle |
| 4 | 19 May 1940 | 13:50 | Mureaux | Amiens | 8 | 5 June 1940 | 10:50 | LeO 451 | Nesle |
| 5 | 23 May 1940 | 14:12 | Hurricane | Douai | ? | 5 June 1940 | 10:50 | LeO 451 | Nesle |
| ? | 23 May 1940 | 14:15 | Hurricane | Douai | 9 | 5 June 1940 | 21:22 | M.S.406 | Roye |
– 7. Staffel of Jagdgeschwader 27 – Action at the Channel and over England — 26 June – 10 November 1940
| 10? | 11 July 1940 | 09:03 | Hurricane | south of Portland | 13 | 25 August 1940 | 18:55 | Hurricane | Portland |
| 11 | 8 August 1940 | 13:25 | Hurricane | south of the Isle of Wight | 14? (Note: This claim is not listed by Mathews and Foreman.) | 8 September 1940 | 13:42 | Blenheim | Calais |
| 12 | 16 August 1940 | 14:20 | Hurricane | Portsmouth | | | | | |
– Stab I. Gruppe of Jagdgeschwader 27 – Sicily, Balkans and North Africa — 4 December 1940 – 31 May 1941
| 15 | 23 April 1941 | 10:40 | Hurricane | Tobruk | 16 | 23 April 1941 | 11:05 | Hurricane | Tobruk |
– 3. Staffel of Jagdgeschwader 27 – Sicily, Balkans and North Africa — 1 June – 17 November 1941
| 17 | 14 June 1941 | 05:05 | Hurricane | south of Ain el Gazala | 21 | 30 June 1941 | 16:35 | P-40 | north of Marsa Luccech |
| 18 | 14 June 1941 | 05:06 | Martin 167 | southeast of Ain el Gazala | 22 | 19 July 1941 | 18:15 | P-40 | north of Ras Asaz |
| 19 | 15 June 1941 | 16:30 | Hurricane | southeast of Gambut | 23 | 9 September 1941 | 17:15 | Hurricane | 30 km (19 mi) east of Sidi Barrani |
| 20 | 26 June 1941 | 13:45 | P-40 | Ain el Gazala | 24 | 12 October 1941 | 08:08 | P-40 | Bir Sheferzen |
– 1. Staffel of Jagdgeschwader 27 – In North Africa — 5 December 1941 – 31 October 1942
| 25 | 17 December 1941 | 11:12 | P-40 | Martuba | 32? | 9 June 1942 | 07:50 | P-40 | southwest of Hagfa el Beda |
| 26 | 17 December 1941 | 11:20 | P-40 | southeast of Timimi | 33 | 12 June 1942 | 18:50 | Hurricane | Al Adm |
| 27 | 23 December 1941 | 12:24 | Maryland | northeast Ajdabiya | 34 | 26 June 1942 | 12:12 | P-40 | southwest of Mersa Matruh |
| 28 | 21 March 1942 | 07:55 | P-40 | north of Ain el Gazala | 35? | 27 June 1942 | 08:55 | Martin 167 | southwest of RAF El Daba |
| 29 | 27 March 1942 | 16:55 | P-40 | south of Ain el Gazala | 36 | 27 June 1942 | 18:25 | Hurricane | southwest of Fouka |
| 30 | 11 April 1942 | 10:55 | P-40 | 20 km (12 mi) northeast of Bir Habex | 37 | 5 July 1942 | 13:50 | Spitfire | 20 km (12 mi) south of El Alamein |
| 31 | 22 May 1942 | 07:41 | P-40 | 20 km (12 mi) east of Derna | 38 | 17 July 1942 | 13:12 | Hurricane | southwest of El Alamein |
| — (Note: This unconfirmed claim is not listed by Mathews and Foreman.) | 22 May 1942 | 07:51 | P-40 | south of Timimi | 39? | 12 October 1942 | — | Spitfire | La Valetta, Malta |
– Stab I. Gruppe of Jagdgeschwader 27 – Defense of the Reich — 29 July – 31 December 1943
| 40 | 14 October 1943 | 14:50 | B-17 | 10 km (6.2 mi) east of Schweinfurt | 42 | 14 October 1943 | 14:55? (Note: According to Mathews and Foreman claimed at 15:02.) | B-17 | 15 km (9.3 mi) west-southwest of Rothenburg |
| 41 | 14 October 1943 | 14:55 | B-17 | 20 km (12 mi) southeast of Schweinfurt | | | | | |

=== Awards ===
- Iron Cross (1939) 2nd and 1st Class
- Honor Goblet of the Luftwaffe on 20 October 1940
- Knight's Cross of the Iron Cross on 20 July 1941 as Oberleutnant and adjudant of the I./Jagdgeschwader 27 (Note: According to Scherzer on 23 July 1941.)
- German Cross in Gold on 12 January 1943 as Hauptmann in the I./Jagdgeschwader 27

== Publications ==
- Franzisket, Ludwig (1950). Gewohnheitsbildung und bedingte Reflexe bei Rückenmarksfröschen (in German). OCLC 720589926.
- Franzisket, Ludwig (1966). Die Geschichte des Lebens Ausstellung im Landesmuseum für Naturkunde in Münster in Westfalen (in German). Münster, Germany: Verlag für Natur und Heimat. OCLC 73767732.
- Franzisket, Ludwig (1967). Die Geschichte des Westfälischen Landesmuseums für Naturkunde (in German). Landesmuseum für Naturkunde. OCLC 634307052.
- Franzisket, Ludwig (1970). The Atrophy of Hermatypic Reef Corals Maintained in Darkness and their Subsequent Regeneration in Light. OCLC 1411597835.
- Franzisket, Ludwig (1974). Nitrate uptake by reef corals. OCLC 1411597760.

== Notes ==
Military offices
| Preceded by Oberstleutnant Gustav Rödel | Commander of Jagdgeschwader 27 "Afrika"; 30 December 1944 – 8 May 1945 | Succeeded by none |
Academic offices
| Preceded by Bernhard Rensch | Director of the Westphalian Museum of Natural History; 1956 – 1984 | Succeeded by Alfred Hendricks |
