= Karl-Wolfgang Redlich =

German World War II fighter pilot

- Born: 13 December 1914; Hamburg, German Empire
- Died: 29 May 1944 (aged 29); Sankt Pölten, Nazi Germany
- Cause of death: Killed in action
- Military career
- Allegiance: Nazi Germany
- Branch: Luftwaffe
- Rank: Major in the general staff
- Units: J/88, JG 27
- Commands: 1./JG 27, I./JG 27
- Conflicts: See battles: Spanish Civil War; World War II Battle of France Battle of Britain Operation Marita North African campaign Defense of the Reich †
- Awards: Spanish Cross in Gold with Swords; Knight's Cross of the Iron Cross

Karl-Wolfgang Redlich (13 December 1914 – 29 May 1944) was a German Luftwaffe military aviator in the Spanish Civil War and a fighter ace during World War II. He is credited with 41 aerial victories, potentially 43 aerial victories, including four in Spain. All his World War II victories were claimed over the Western Allies.

Born in Hamburg, Redlich volunteered for military service in the Reichsmarine (German Navy) in April 1934. He later transferred to the Luftwaffe and was trained as a fighter pilot. In later 1938, Redlich fought in the Spanish Civil War with Jagdgruppe 88, under the command of the Condor Legion, and claimed four aerial victories. For his service in Spain, he was awarded the Spanish Cross in Gold with Swords. Shortly after the outbreak of World War II, Redlich was appointed Staffelkapitän (squadron leader) of 1. Staffel (1st squadron) of Jagdgeschwader 27 (JG 27—27th Fighter Wing). With this squadron, he fought in the Battle of France and Britain. In April 1941, his unit was sent to North Africa, fighting in North African campaign. Following 21 aerial victories claimed, Redlich was awarded the Knight's Cross of the Iron Cross in July 1941. In December 1941, he was transferred, serving in various staff positions with the Oberkommando der Luftwaffe (OKL—Luftwaffe High Command). On 19 May 1944, Redlich was appointed Gruppenkommandeur (group commander) of I. Gruppe (1st group) of JG 27 which was fighting in defense of the Reich over Austria. Ten days later on 29 May, Redlich was killed in action during aerial combat with United States Army Air Forces bombers over Sankt Pölten.

== Early life and career ==
Redlich was born on 13 December 1914 in Hamburg, at the time a sovereign state of the German Empire. In April 1934, he volunteered for military service in the Reichsmarine (German Navy), later renamed to Kriegsmarine, as an officer cadet. He later transferred to the Luftwaffe and following flight and fighter pilot training, (Note: Flight training in the Luftwaffe progressed through the levels A1, A2 and B1, B2, referred to as A/B flight training. A training included theoretical and practical training in aerobatics, navigation, long-distance flights and dead-stick landings. The B courses included high-altitude flights, instrument flights, night landings and training to handle the aircraft in difficult situations.) was posted to I. Gruppe (1st group) of Jagdgeschwader 134 (JG 134—134th Fighter Wing) in August 1936.

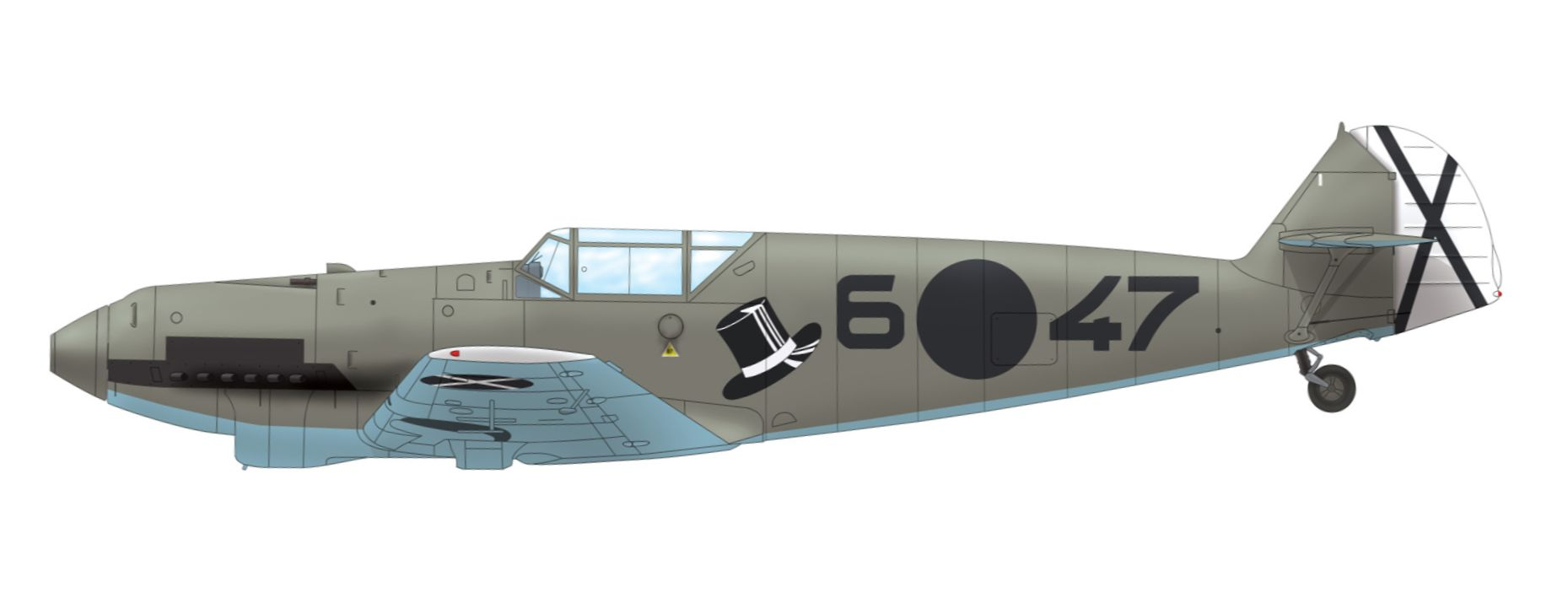
A Bf 109C-1 of 2. Staffel of J/88

In late 1938, Redlich volunteered for service with the Condor Legion during the Spanish Civil War. Following the Battle of the Ebro, Redlich claimed a Tupolev SB-2 bomber shot down on 28 December. On 4 January 1939, he was credited with a second SB-2 shot down. Redlich claimed his fourth and last aerial victory in Spain on 4 February, a Polikarpov I-15 fighter. He was later awarded the Spanish Cross in Gold with Swords (Spanienkreuz in Gold mit Schwertern) on 14 April 1939 for his service in the Spanish Civil War.

== World War II ==
World War II in Europe began on Friday, 1 September 1939, when German forces invaded Poland. On 1 October 1939, the new I. Gruppe (1st group) of Jagdgeschwader 27 (JG 27—27th Fighter Wing) was created at Münster-Handorf Airfield and placed under command of Hauptmann Helmut Riegel. Redlich was transferred and appointed Staffelkapitän (squadron leader) of 1. Staffel (1st squadron) of JG 27. On 22 January 1940, the Gruppe moved to Krefeld Airfield where they were tasked with flying fighter protection during the "Phoney War" along the German – Belgian border. During this period, the pilots had little to no enemy contact. In late March, I. Gruppe moved to an airfield at Mönchengladbach.

=== Battle of France and Britain ===
On 10 May 1940, German forces launched the invasion of France and the Low Countries (Fall Gelb). At the start of the invasion, I. Gruppe of JG 27 was subordinated to the VIII. Fliegerkorps (8th Air Corps). The next day, Redlich claimed his first victory of World War II, a Fairey Battle light bomber shot down near Tongeren, probably belonging to the Belgian Air Force. For this, he was awarded the Iron Cross 2nd Class (Eisernes Kreuz zweiter Klasse). On 16 May, 1. Staffel intercepted a Royal Air Force (RAF) Westland Lysander aerial reconnaissance aircraft, escorted by Hawker Hurricane fighters, in the area of Brussels and Charleroi. In this encounter, 1. Staffel pilots claimed five aerial victories, including a Hurricane by Redlich.

JG 27 insignia

On 18 May, I. Gruppe moved to Charleville located approximately 15 kilometers (9.3 miles) west-northwest of Sedan. On 22 May, the Gruppe moved to Guise. Three days later, they were ordered to Saint-Omer for combat against the encircled Allied forces fighting in the Battle of Dunkirk. On 29 May, Redlich claimed his third aerial victory, a Hurricane fighter shot down over Dunkirk. This claim earned him the Iron Cross 1st Class (Eisernes Kreuz erster Klasse) that day. The Gruppe returned to Guise on 31 May. On 2 June, the Gruppe flew an early morning mission to Dunkirk. On this mission, Redlich claimed a Supermarine Spitfire shot down. When the Armistice of 22 June 1940 was signed, Redlich was credited with seven aerial victories and was one of the leading fighter pilots of I. Gruppe of JG 27. On 28 June, the Gruppe was ordered to Neuenlander Feld in Bremen for a brief period of rest and replenishment.

In preparation in what would become the Battle of Britain, I. Gruppe was moved to the English Channel on 2 July where they were based at an airfield near Plumetot. On 7 September 1940, I. Gruppe participated in Operation "Loge", 350 bombers escorted by 648 fighters, attacked various targets in the greater London area. The Gruppe protected those bombers returning from the docks in the East End of London. On this mission, Redlich claimed a Spitfire shot down at 18:55 southeast of London. Two days later, the Luftwaffe flew its second large scale attack of Operation "Loge". That day, Redlich claimed a Hurricane shot down over London. Redlich claimed his last aerial victory during the Battle of Britain on 27 September. Again escorting Luftwaffe bombers to London, Redlich claimed his tenth aerial victory in total when he shot down a Hurricane near Sevenoaks. On 1 October, I. Gruppe was withdrawn from the English Channel and had relocated to an airfield at Stade in Northern Germany. Here the Gruppe was subordinated to the Geschwaderstab (headquarters unit) of Jagdgeschwader 1 (JG 1—1st Fighter Wing) and tasked with patrolling the German Bight. This assignment ended on 21 October, when the Gruppe was ordered to relocate to Dinan in northwestern France.

=== North Africa ===
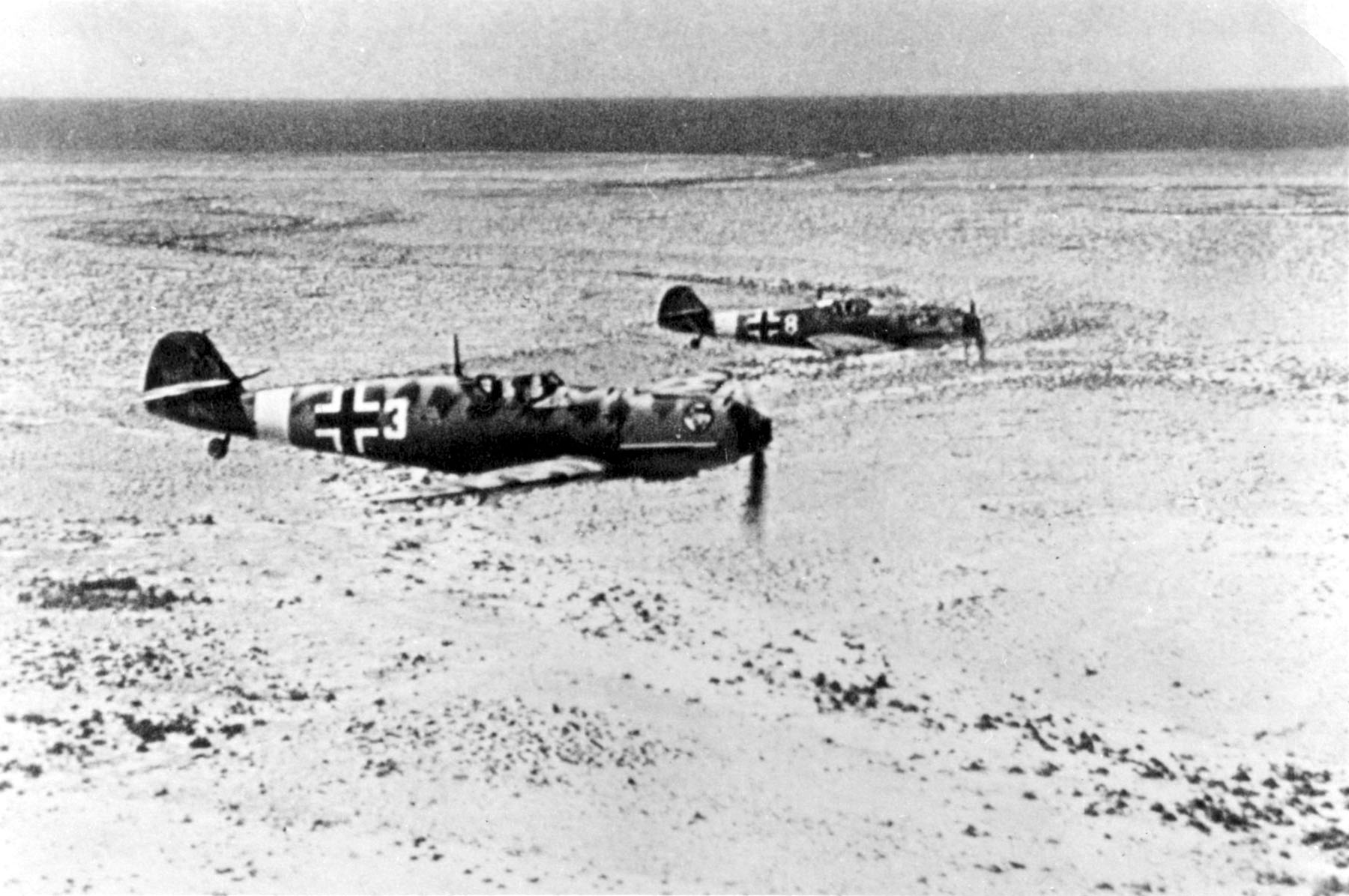
Two Bf 109 Es over North Africa

On 3 December 1940, I. Gruppe was again withdrawn from the English Channel and relocated to Döberitz located approximately 10 kilometers (6.2 miles) west of Staaken. There, the pilots were sent on home leave, returning in January 1941. In February, the Gruppe began preparations for Operation Marita, the German invasion of Greece while the ground elements of the Gruppe began their relocation to Tripoli in North Africa, arriving there on 18 March. There, the ground crew began preparations for the air elements to arrive at the designated airfield at Ayn al-Ġazāla. In parallel, the air elements of I. Gruppe relocated to Munich-Riem Airfield in early March. There, the Gruppe received refurbished Messerschmitt Bf 109 E-7 fighter aircraft. The aircraft had been equipped with a sand-filter on the front of the supercharger intake which made the aircraft more suitable for deployment in North Africa. On 4 April, the Gruppe was ordered to move to Graz Airfield for Operation Marita. German forces launched the attack on 6 April. The orders for I. Gruppe that day were to attack and destroy the Yugoslavian air defenses in the area of Laibach, present-day Ljubljana in Slovenia. At the time of his relocation to North Africa, Redlich was credited with ten aerial victories.

Following Operation Marita, the air elements briefly returned to Munich-Riem before they transferred to North Africa, arriving in Ayn al-Ġazāla between 18 and 22 April 1941. On 19 April, 1. Staffel flew its first combat mission in North Africa. On a mid-day mission to Tobruk, Redlich claimed two Hurricane fighters shot down. On 23 April, Redlich claimed two Bristol Blenheim bombers shot down near Tobruk. His opponents probably belonged to the RAF No. 55 Squadron. On 30 April, Redlich claimed a Hurricane fighter shot down near Tobruk. The Hurricane may have belonged to the RAF No. 274 Squadron which lost two aircraft that day. On 16 May, Redlich shot down the Blenheim IV V5817 of No. 45 Squadron. On 9 July, Redlich was awarded the Knight's Cross of the Iron Cross (Ritterkreuz des Eisernen Kreuzes) for 21 aerial victories claimed. After Oberleutnant Gerhard Homuth from 3. Staffel, he was the second pilot within I. Gruppe of JG 27 to receive this distinction in North Africa.

In late October, I. Gruppe was reequipped with the Bf 109 F-4/trop. To retain operation status, 1. and 3. Staffel left North Africa on 22 October while 2. Staffel stayed. In Italy they handed over their Bf 109 E variants and continued the journey back home by train. The pilots were sent on a short home-leave before returning to Ayn al-Ġazāla on 10 November.

=== Luftwaffe staff service ===
On 5 December 1941, Redlich was transferred to the Oberkommando der Luftwaffe (OKL—Luftwaffe High Command). Command of 1. Staffel of JG 27 was then given to Oberleutnant Ludwig Franzisket. On 26 January 1942, Redlich was appointed Ia (operations officer) in the staff of Fliegerführer Afrika, an organizational until controlling air operations during the North African campaign, under command of Generalmajor Stefan Fröhlich. On 19 November, Redlich transferred to the staff of II. Fliegerkorps (2nd Air Corps) headed by General der Flieger Bruno Loerzer. In June 1943, he was posted to the XII. Fliegerkorps (12th Air Corps) where he was promoted to Major in August. This assignment was followed by another posting to the staff of the OKL.

=== Group commander and death ===
On 19 May 1944, Redlich, who commanded the Verbandsführerschule of the General der Jagdflieger (Training School for Unit Leaders), was transferred and appointed Gruppenkommandeur (group commander) of I. Gruppe of JG 27. He succeeded Hauptmann Ernst Börngen who had been severely injured in combat that day. At the time, the Gruppe was based at Fels am Wagram and fighting in defense of the Reich missions.

On 29 May 1944, the United States Army Air Forces (USAAF) targeted German aircraft production and Luftwaffe infrastructure. The USAAF Eighth Air Force sent 993 heavy bombers to Leipzig, Sorau, present-day Żary, and Posen, present-day Poznań, the airfield at Tutow, as well as the Synthetic Fuel Factory Pölitz at Pölitz. At the same time, the USAAF Fifteenth Air Force attacked the Wiener Neustädter Flugzeugwerke, manufacturing at Atzgersdorf, and the airfield at Wollersdorf, with 563 heavy bombers. At 08:55, I. Gruppe was scrambled at Fels am Wagram. In the area of Sankt Pölten, the Gruppe under the leadership of Redlich intercepted a formation of Consolidated B-24 Liberator bombers. During this encounter, the Gruppe claimed five bombers shot down, including one by Redlich. However, Redlich was then killed in action when he was shot down in his Bf 109 G-6/U4 (Werknummer 441468—factory number) near Sankt Pölten. Redlich was buried in the war grave section of the Main Cemetery Sankt Pölten (Block 3–Row 7–Grave 202). Following his death, command of I. Gruppe was passed on to Hauptmann Walter Blume, who had commanded 3. Staffel.

== Summary of career ==
=== Aerial victory claims ===
According to Obermaier, Redlich was credited with 41 aerial victories, four in the Spanish Civil War and another 37 in World War II, claimed in an unknown number of combat missions. Forsyth states that three of his four aerial victories claimed in Spain were unconfirmed. The authors Ring and Girbig list Redlich with 43 aerial victories which includes one four-engined heavy bomber. Mathews and Foreman, authors of Luftwaffe Aces — Biographies and Victory Claims, researched the German Federal Archives and found documentation for 37 aerial victory claims, plus four further unconfirmed claims. This number includes four claims during the Spanish Civil War and 37 claims during World War II over the Western allies on the Western Front and North Africa, including one four-engined heavy bomber.

Chronicle of aerial victories
This and the ? (question mark) indicates information discrepancies listed by Prien, Stemmer, Rodeike, Bock, Mathews and Foreman.
Claim	Date	Time	Type	Location	Unit	Claim	Date	Time	Type	Location	Unit
Spanish Civil War
– Claims with Jagdgruppe 88 – Spanish Civil War — November 1938 – February 1939
1	5 November 1938	—	I-16		2. J/88	3	4 January 1939	—	SB-2		2. J/88
2	28 December 1938	—	SB-2		2. J/88	4	5 February 1939	—	I-15		2. J/88
World War II
– Claims with I. Gruppe of Jagdgeschwader 27 – Battle of France — 10 May – 25 June 1940
1	11 May 1940	07:40	Battle	Tongeren	1./JG 27	5	5 June 1940	18:20	M.S.406	Forest of Compiègne	1./JG 27
2? (Note: According to Mathews and Foreman this claim is unconfirmed.)	16 May 1940	—	Hurricane	Charleroi; Brussels	1./JG 27	6	13 June 1940	16:30	Battle	Provins	1./JG 27
3?	29 May 1940	—	Hurricane	Dunkirk	1./JG 27	7	13 June 1940	20:05	Battle	Montmirail	1./JG 27
4?	2 June 1940	—	Spitfire	west of Dunkirk	1./JG 27						
– Claims with I. Gruppe of Jagdgeschwader 27 – Action at the Channel and over England — 26 June – 3 December 1940
8	7 September 1940	18:55	Spitfire	southeast of London	1./JG 27	10	27 September 1940	10:15	Hurricane	Sevenoaks	1./JG 27
9	9 September 1940	18:35	Hurricane	London	1./JG 27						
– Claims with I. Gruppe of Jagdgeschwader 27 – Sicily, Balkans and North Africa — 4 December 1940 – 17 November 1941
11	19 April 1941	13:50	Hurricane	southeast of Tobruk	1./JG 27	18	14 June 1941	18:45	Hurricane	southeast of Halfaya Pass	1./JG 27
12	19 April 1941	14:00	Hurricane	west of Tobruk	1./JG 27	19	15 June 1941	11:40	Hurricane	Sallum	1./JG 27
13	23 April 1941	12:50	Blenheim	northeast of Tobruk	1./JG 27	20	15 June 1941	17:35	Hurricane	southeast of Fort Capuzzo	1./JG 27
14	23 April 1941	12:55	Blenheim	north of Tobruk	1./JG 27	21	18 June 1941	06:00	Brewster	east of Sallum	1./JG 27
15	30 April 1941	06:15	Hurricane	Tobruk	1./JG 27	22	21 August 1941	17:55	Martin 167	west of Sidi Barrani	1./JG 27
16	16 May 1941	16:55	Blenheim	vicinity of Tobruk	1./JG 27	23	14 September 1941	18:15	P-40	south-southeast of Sidi Azeiz Airfield	1./JG 27
17	9 June 1941	05:00	Hurricane	north of Tobruk	1./JG 27	24	27 September 1941	16:50	P-40	southwest of Sidi Barrani	1./JG 27
– Claims with I. Gruppe of Jagdgeschwader 27 – In North Africa — 18 November – 5 December 1941
25	18 November 1941	09:30	Martin 167	south of Ayn al-Ġazāla	1./JG 27	31	23 November 1941	08:35	Hurricane	southeast of Al Adm	1./JG 27
26	20 November 1941	12:15	P-40	Bir el Gubi	1./JG 27	32?	23 November 1941	—	Hurricane	southeast of Al Adm	1./JG 27
27	22 November 1941	10:40	P-40	east of Bir el Gubi	1./JG 27	33	23 November 1941	16:35	Hurricane	south of Bir el Gubi	1./JG 27
28	22 November 1941	14:00	Blenheim	southeast of Ayn al-Ġazāla	1./JG 27	34	26 November 1941	16:15	P-40	west of Bu Amud	1./JG 27
29	22 November 1941	14:15	Blenheim	northeast of Bir Hakeim	1./JG 27	35	1 December 1941	12:55	Hurricane	Bir el Gubi	1./JG 27
30	22 November 1941	16:45	P-40	southeast of Bir Hakeim	1./JG 27	36	5 December 1941	12:05	P-40	south of Bir el Gubi	1./JG 27
– Claims with I. Gruppe of Jagdgeschwader 27 – Defense of the Reich – May 1944
37	29 May 1944	10:30	B-24	Sankt Pölten	Stab I./JG 27						

=== Awards ===
- Spanish Cross in Gold with Swords (14 April 1939)
- Iron Cross (1939)
  - 2nd Class (11 May 1940)
  - 1st Class (29 May 1940)
- Knight's Cross of the Iron Cross on 9 July 1941 as Oberleutnant and Staffelkapitän of the 1./Jagdgeschwader 27
- German Cross in Gold on 2 July 1942 as a Hauptmann'' in the I./Jagdgeschwader 27
