= Ernst Börngen =

German World War II fighter pilot (1916–1989)

- Born: 7 February 1916; Meuselwitz, Kingdom of Saxony, German Empire
- Died: 30 June 1989 (aged 73); Mering, Bavaria, West Germany
- Military career
- Allegiance: Nazi Germany
- Branch: Luftwaffe
- Service years: 1937–1945
- Rank: Hauptmann (captain)
- Unit: JG 27
- Commands: I./JG 27
- Conflicts: See battles World War II: Battle of Britain; Balkan Campaign; Operation Barbarossa; North African Campaign; Italian Campaign; Defense of the Reich
- Awards: Knight's Cross of the Iron Cross

Ernst Börngen (7 February 1916 – 30 June 1989) was a Luftwaffe ace and recipient of the Knight's Cross of the Iron Cross during World War II. The Knight's Cross of the Iron Cross, and its variants were the highest awards in the military and paramilitary forces of Nazi Germany during World War II. Börngen claimed 41 victories in 450 missions. Bergen held positions of Staffelkapitän (squadron leader) and Gruppenkommandeur (group commander) in Jagdgeschwader 27 (JG 27—27th Fighter Wing). He was severely injured in combat 19 May 1944, losing one arm, when he rammed a bomber.

== Early life and career ==
Börngen was born 7 February 1916 in Meuselwitz, at the time in the Kingdom of Saxony within German Empire. In November 1937, he joined the military service of the Luftwaffe as a Fähnrich (cadet). In August 1938, Börngen was promoted to Leutnant and following flight and fighter pilot training, (Note: Flight training in the Luftwaffe progressed through the levels A1, A2 and B1, B2, referred to as A/B flight training. A training included theoretical and practical training in aerobatics, navigation, long-distance flights and dead-stick landings. The B courses included high-altitude flights, instrument flights, night landings and training to handle the aircraft in difficult situations.) he was briefly transferred to the Reichsluftfahrtministerium (RLM—Ministry of Aviation) in December 1939. In June 1940, Börngen was posted to 4. Staffel (4th squadron) of Jagdgeschwader 27 (JG 27—27th Fighter Wing) where he was appointed Technischer Offizier (TO—Technical Officer).

== World War II ==
On 5 August 1940, II. Gruppe (2nd group) of JG 27 was ordered to an airfield at Crépon, France for combat in the Battle of Britain. During this battle, JG 27 was subordinated to the VIII. Fliegerkorps (8th Air Corps). On 8 August, the Gruppenkommandeur (group commander) Hauptmann Werner Andres was shot down. Although rescued, his injuries prevented him from leading the Gruppe. In consequence, Oberleutnant Ernst Düllberg was briefly put in command until Hauptmann Wolfgang Lippert officially assumed command on 4 September. On 18 August, also known as the Hardest Day, II. Gruppe escorted Junkers Ju 87 dive bombers from I. Gruppe of Sturzkampfgeschwader 77 (StG 77—77th Dive Bomber Wing) on their mission to bomb RAF Thorney Island. Near the Isle of Wight, the flight was intercepted by two squadrons of Hawker Hurricane fighters, shortly after Supermarine Spitfire engaged too. During this encounter, the Ju 87 dive bombers suffered heavy losses while Börngen claimed two Spitfire fighters shot down near Selsey Bill, his first aerial victories claimed. On 5 November, II. Gruppe was withdrawn from combat operations on the English Channel, relocating to Detmold on 9 November.

While based at Detmold, the pilots were given a period of rest while the Gruppe received a few factory new Messerschmitt Bf 109 E-7 aircraft. On 2 January 1941, II. Gruppe received orders to relocate to Romania. On 10 January, the air elements flew to Wien-Schwechat airfield where they stayed two weeks. On 10 February, the Gruppe relocated to Bucharest-Băneasa airfield. After the Bulgaria joined the Axis powers on 1 March, II. Gruppe was ordered to relocate to an airfield named Sofia-Vrba located approximately halfway between Radomir and Sofia to augment the VIII. Fliegerkorps (8th Air Corps) commanded by Generaloberst Wolfram Freiherr von Richthofen. This relocation was already made in preparation for Operation Marita, the German invasion of Greece and Yugoslavia launched on 6 April. On 15 April, elements of II. Gruppe escorted bombers to the airfields at Kalambaka and Vasiliki which were occupied by the Hellenic Air Force. On this mission, Börngen claimed a Gloster Gladiator shot down west of Trikkala. In preparation for Operation Barbarossa, the German invasion of the Soviet Union, II. Gruppe was moved to a makeshift airfield name Praszniki, located northeast of Suwałki close to the Curzon Line, on 18 June. On 25 June, Börngen claimed his only aerial victories on the Eastern Front. Depending on source, the claims were a Tupolev SB bomber and/or an Ilyushin DB-3 bomber near Halshany. On 1 July, II. Gruppe was withdrawn from combat operations, all serviceable aircraft were transferred to III. Gruppe of JG 27 and the personnel was ordered to return to Suwałki, awaiting further orders.

=== North Africa and Mediterranean theater ===
II./JG 27 emblem

Following the withdrawal from the Eastern Front, II. Gruppe arrived in Döberitz on 24 July 1941. The entire personnel then went on vacation, returning to Döberitz on 18 August. Over the next three weeks, the Gruppe converted to the Bf 109 F-4 fighter. Relocation to the North African Theater began on 7 September, with 4. Staffel transferring south on 16 September and 5. Staffel on 27 September, where they were based at an airfield in Ain el Gazala. There, II. Gruppe joined I. Gruppe of JG 27 which was already based in North Africa. Börngen, who had been transferred to 5. Staffel, claimed his first aerial victory in North Africa on 21 December, a Bristol Blenheim bomber shot down 3 kilometers (1.9 miles) southwest El Agheila. On 30 May 1942, Börngen claimed a Curtiss P-40 "Tomahawk" southeast of Fort Acroma during the Battle of Gazala.

On 20 May 1942, Börngen officially replaced Hauptmann (captain) Ernst Düllberg as Staffelkapitän (squadron leader) of 5. Staffel. Düllberg had been wounded in action on 22 November 1941 and Börngen had already acted as intermittent Staffelführer for some weeks. On 11 July, Börngen claimed a Spitfire fighter shot down southwest of El Alamein. In this encounter his Bf 109 F-4 trop (Werknummer 10 203—factory number) was damaged in aerial combat with P-40 fighters from the South African Air Force (SAAF) 2 Squadron, resulting in a forced landing east of El Dabaa On 20 July, Börngen claimed a P-40 near El Alamein, to date, his opponent could not be identified.

After II. Gruppe of JG 27 was withdrawn from North Africa the unit was ordered to Düsseldorf. The pilots where then sent on home-leave. On 2 January 1943, the Gruppe was ordered to the airfield Wien-Aspern at Vienna and to Sicily on 15 February. The personnel travelled by train to Bari where they received factory new Bf 109 G-4 trop aircraft. The Gruppe arrived at the airfield in Trapani on 27 February. On 28 May, the United States Army Air Forces (USAAF) attacked various targets in Sicily. In combat with the 321st Bombardment Group, Börngen claimed to have shot down a Consolidated B-24 Liberator bomber near Castelvetrano and a North American B-25 Mitchell bomber near Marsala.

Börngen led 5. Staffel until 16 July 1943. That day, he had claimed his 28th aerial victory over a B-24 bomber. During the attack, his Bf 109 G-6 (Werknummer 18 371) took a cabin hit from the defensive fire of the bomber, wounding him severely. Despite being wounded, he crash landed the aircraft at San Vito dei Normanni. In consequence, command of 5. Staffel was passed on to Oberleutnant Walter Otte. During his convalescence, Börngen was awarded the German Cross in Gold (Deutsches Kreuz in Gold) on 31 August.

=== Defense of the Reich ===
Following his convalescence in April 1944, Börngen served with the Geschwaderstab (headquarters unit) of JG 27 which was based at Fels am Wagram and fighting in defense of the Reich. Here on 3 April, Börngen claimed a USAAF Boeing B-17 Flying Fortress bomber shot down south of Bucharest. When on 13 April Leutnant Karl Wünsch, the commander of 2. Staffel, was wounded in combat, Börngen was transferred and given command of the Staffel. In May, the Western Allies initiated the Oil Campaign of World War II, targeting various facilities supplying Germany with petroleum, oil, and lubrication products. On 12 May, the Eighth Air Force sent an attack force of 886 heavy bombers, protected by 980 escort fighters, against the German refineries in central Germany at Leuna, Merseburg, Böhlen and Zeitz. In defense of this attack, I. Gruppe engaged a formation of B-17 bombers shortly past 12:30 just east of Eschborn. In this encounter, the Gruppenkommandeur of I. Gruppe, Major Ludwig Franzisket was severely wounded. The next day, Börngen succeeded Franzisket as commander of I. Gruppe and surrendered his command of 2. Staffel to Leutnant Karl Wünsch again.

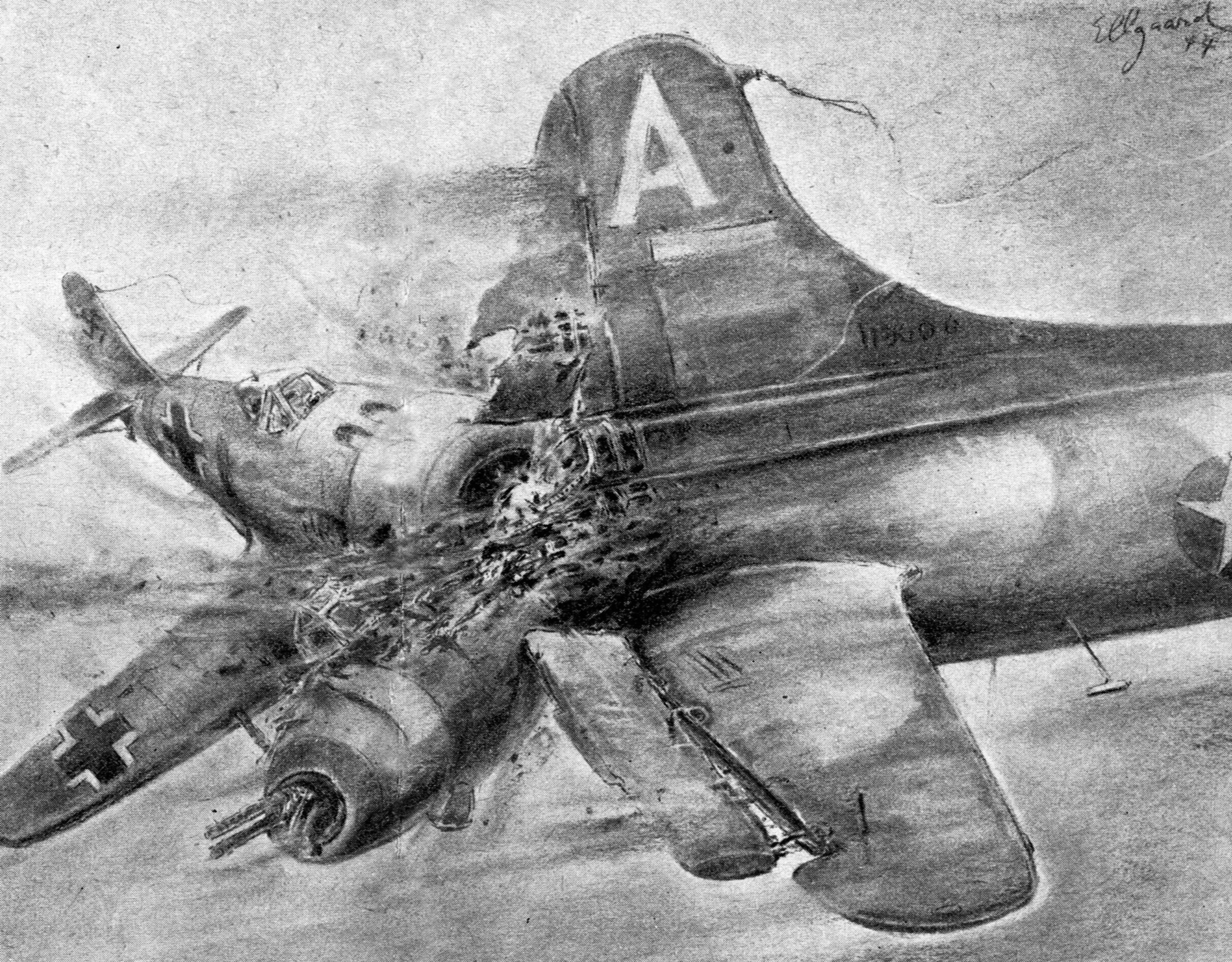
A 1944 drawing by Helmuth Ellgaard illustrating "ramming"

On 19 May 1944, the Eighth Air Force targeted Berlin and Braunschweig with 888 heavy bombers, protected by 964 escort fighters. The German aerial defenses under the command Jagdfliegerführer Ostmark ordered I. Gruppe, led by Börngen and at the time based at Fels am Wagram, to take off at 11:43. Börngen's group was ordered to meet up with III. and VI. Gruppe to form a larger combat formation. This formation was then vectored to Magdeburg where at 13:00 they encountered the escort fighters of a formation of B-24 bombers northwest of the city. While III. and VI. Gruppe engaged the Republic P-47 Thunderbolt and North American P-51 Mustang fighters, the Stabsschwarm and I. Gruppe managed to attack the B-24 bombers. Following the encounter, JG 27 claimed 17 aerial victories, including Herausschüsse (separation shots)—a severely damaged heavy bomber forced to separate from his combat box which was counted as an aerial victory. In return, JG 27 suffered five aircraft lost, two pilots killed in action and one pilot severely wounded. At 13:15, Börngen had shot down a B-24 near Helmstedt and then at 13:20 engaged another bomber by ramming it with his Bf 109 G-6 (Werknummer 441 101—factory number), sustaining severe injuries. He managed to bail out and was immediately taken to the Luftwaffe hospital at Helmstedt where his right arm had to be amputated. Börngen was then replaced by Major Karl-Wolfgang Redlich as commander of I. Gruppe. On 27 July, Börngen who could no longer fly combat missions, was awarded the Knight's Cross of the Iron Cross (Ritterkreuz des Eisernen Kreuzes).

== Later life ==
Börngen died on 30 June 1989 at the age of 73 in Mering, West Germany.

== Summary of career ==
=== Aerial victory claims ===
Börngen was credited with 41 enemy aircraft shot down in over 450 combat missions, the majority of which on the Western Front and two on the Eastern Front. This figure includes 16 four-engined bombers. Ring and Girbig list him with 45 aerial victories, including one on the Eastern Front and 24 heavy bombers. Weal also lists him with 45 aerial victories of which 24 were heavy bombers, just like Feist and McGuirl. Mathews and Foreman, authors of Luftwaffe Aces — Biographies and Victory Claims, researched the German Federal Archives and found records for 35 aerial victory claims, plus four further unconfirmed claims. This figure includes two aerial victories on the Eastern Front and 33 over the Western Allies, including 14 four-engined bombers.

Victory claims were logged to a map-reference (PQ = Planquadrat), for example "PQ 15 Ost S/OT-2/3". The Luftwaffe grid map (Jägermeldenetz) covered all of Europe, western Russia and North Africa and was composed of rectangles measuring 15 minutes of latitude by 30 minutes of longitude, an area of about 360 square miles (930 km^{2}). These sectors were then subdivided into 36 smaller units to give a location area 3 km × 4 km (1.9 mi × 2.5 mi) in size.

Chronicle of aerial victories
This along with the * (asterisk) indicates an Herausschuss (separation shot)—a severely damaged heavy bomber forced to separate from his combat box which was counted as an aerial victory. This and the ? (question mark) indicates information discrepancies listed by Prien, Stemmer, Rodeike, Bock, Mathews and Foreman.
Claim	Date	Time	Type	Location	Unit	Claim	Date	Time	Type	Location	Unit
– Claims with II. Gruppe of Jagdgeschwader 27 – On the Channel Front – August – November 1940
1	18 August 1940	15:30	Spitfire	Selsey Bill	4./JG 27	2	18 August 1940	15:40	Spitfire	Selsey Bill	4./JG 27
– Claims with II. Gruppe of Jagdgeschwader 27 – During the Balkan Campaign – April 1940
3	15 April 1941	07:01	Gladiator	west Trikkala	4./JG 27						
– Claims with II. Gruppe of Jagdgeschwader 27 – On the Eastern Front – June 1941
4	25 June 1941	11:02	DB-3? (Note: According to Prien, Rodeike and Stemmer's 1997 book, this claim was over a Tupolev SB.)	Usmana-Halshany	4./JG 27	5? (Note: This claim is not listed in the 2003 book by Prien, Stemmer, Rodeike and Bock.)	25 June 1941	—	DB		4./JG 27
– Claims with II. Gruppe of Jagdgeschwader 27 – In North Africa – April 1941 – December 1942
6	21 December 1941	15:02	Blenheim	3 km (1.9 mi) southwest El Agheila	5./JG 27	13	15 September 1942	17:02	P-40	south El Alamein	5./JG 27
7	30 May 1942	17:05	P-40	southeast Fort Acroma	5./JG 27	14	9 October 1942	12:20	Spitfire	north Sanyet Quotaifiya	5./JG 27
8	5 June 1942	11:51	P-40	20 km (12 mi) northeast Mteifl Chebir	5./JG 27	15	20 October 1942	09:20	P-40	east-northeast El Dabaa	5./JG 27
9	26 June 1942	19:03	P-40	southeast Mersa Matruh	5./JG 27	16	27 October 1942	15:03	Spitfire	north Turbiya	5./JG 27
10	3 July 1942	18:12	P-40	west El Alamein	5./JG 27	17	27 October 1942	15:32	Hurricane	northwest El Alamein	5./JG 27
11	11 July 1942	16:07	Spitfire	southwest El Alamein	5./JG 27	18	11 November 1942	09:27	P-40	south Sollum	5./JG 27
12	20 July 1942	18:23	P-40	El Alamein	5./JG 27						
– Claims with II. Gruppe of Jagdgeschwader 27 – Sicily, Tunisia and Italy – April – July 1943
19	29 April 1943	11:27	P-38	10 km (6.2 mi) southwest Marettimo	5./JG 27	24	2 July 1943	11:15	B-24	30 km (19 mi) east-southeast Lecce	5./JG 27
20	22 May 1943	16:15	P-38	south-southwest Marettimo	5./JG 27	25	2 July 1943	11:25	B-24	20 km (12 mi) southwest San Cesario di Lecce	5./JG 27
21	25 May 1943	11:32	B-17	50 km (31 mi) north-northwest Cape San Vito	5./JG 27	26	10 July 1943	16:07	Spitfire	30 km (19 mi) southeast Syracuse	5./JG 27
22	28 May 1943	18:02	B-24	10 km (6.2 mi) south Castelvetrano	5./JG 27	27	12 July 1943	—	Spitfire		5./JG 27
23	28 May 1943	18:06	B-25	20 km (12 mi) southwest Marsala	5./JG 27	28	16 July 1943	13:10	B-24	25 km (16 mi) east-northeast Bari	5./JG 27
– Claims with Stab of Jagdgeschwader 27 – Defense of the Reich – April 1944
29	3 April 1944	10:46	B-17*	50 km (31 mi) south Budapest	Stab/JG 27						
– Claims with III. Gruppe of Jagdgeschwader 27 – Defense of the Reich – April 1944
30	6 April 1944	16:23	B-17	30 km (19 mi) southeast Marburg	Stab III./JG 27	32	12 April 1944	12:12	B-17*	west Lake Neusiedl	Stab III./JG 27
31	12 April 1944	12:10	B-24	southwest Lake Neusiedl	Stab III./JG 27	33	13 April 1944	11:48	B-17	10 km (6.2 mi) east-southeast Raab	Stab III./JG 27
– Claims with I. Gruppe of Jagdgeschwader 27 – Defense of the Reich – April 1944
34	23 April 1944	14:50	B-17	west Willendorf, west of Wiener Neustadt	2./JG 27						
– Claims with Stab of Jagdgeschwader 27 – Defense of the Reich – May 1944
35	12 May 1944	12:37	B-17	PQ 15 Ost S/OT-2/3, northwest Bamberg	Stab/JG 27	36	12 May 1944	12:57	B-17	PQ 05 Ost S/QB-4/5, Bad Orb	Stab/JG 27
– Claims with I. Gruppe of Jagdgeschwader 27 – Defense of the Reich – May 1944
37	19 May 1944	13:15	B-24	6 km (3.7 mi) east Helmstedt	Stab I./JG 27	38	19 May 1944	13:20	B-24	north Helmstedt	Stab I./JG 27

=== Awards ===
- Iron Cross (1939) 2nd and 1st Class
- Wound Badge (1939) in Silver
- Honor Goblet of the Luftwaffe on 25 January 1943 as Oberleutnant and Staffelkapitän (Note: According to Obermaier on 18 January 1943.)
- German Cross in Gold on 31 August 1943 as Hauptmann in the 5./Jagdgeschwader 27
- Knight's Cross of the Iron Cross on 3 August 1944 as Hauptmann and Staffelkapitän of the 5./Jagdgeschwader 27 (Note: According to Scherzer on 27 July 1944 as Gruppenkommandeur of the I./Jagdgeschwader 27.)
