= Börngen =

Börngen is a German surname. Notable people with the surname include:

- Ernst Börngen (1916–1989), German Luftwaffe ace
- Freimut Börngen (1930–2021), German astronomer

== See also ==
- 3859 Börngen, main-belt asteroid
