= Tobruk Airport =

Airport in Libya

Tobruk International Airport مطار طبرق الدولي Maṭār Ṭubruq ad-Dawlī
- IATA: TOB; ICAO: HLTQ

Summary
- Airport type: Public/military
- Serves: Tobruk, Libya
- Location: Al Adm
- Coordinates: 31°51′36″N 23°54′22″E

Map
- Location within Libya

Runways
Direction	Length		Surface
Direction	m	ft	Surface
02/20	3,005	9,859	Concrete
- Sources: SkyVector GCM

Tobruk International Airport (IATA: TOB, ICAO: HLTQ) is an airport serving the Mediterranean port city of Tobruk, capital of the Butnan District of Libya. The airport is 23 kilometres (14 mi) south of Tobruk, at the town of Al Adm.

== History ==
The airport was previously named Gamal Abdel Nasser Airport, after the president of the former United Arab Republic.

The airport was officially opened as Tobruk International Airport on 29 April 2013. The oldest airport in Libya, it had previously offered only internal flights. The first international passenger flight was to Alexandria, Egypt, operated by Libyan Airlines. The airport operates domestic flights to Benghazi and Tripoli.

A new passenger terminal is currently under construction. The airport will have a duty-free zone. Plans are currently underway to establish cargo service to Tobruk's International Airport.

== Historical background ==
At the beginning of World War II, Libya was an Italian colony and Tobruk became the site of important battles between the Allies and Axis powers. Tobruk was strategically important to the conquest of Eastern Libya, then called the province of Cyrenaica. The airfield was significant due to the importance of air power in desert warfare.

== Airlines and destinations ==
As of 2026, the airport has no regular passenger flights.

== See also ==
- Gamal Abdul El Nasser Airbase
- Transport in Libya
- List of airports in Libya
