= Gamal Abdel Nasser Airbase =

Airport in Libya

Gamal Abdel Nasser Airbase قاعدة جمال عبد الناصر الجوية Qāʿida Ǧamāl ʿAbd an-Nāṣir Ǧawwiyya
- IATA: none; ICAO: none

Summary
- Airport type: Military
- Operator: Government
- Location: al-ʿAdam, Butnan District, Libya
- Elevation AMSL: 519 ft / 158 m
- Coordinates: 31°51′41.00″N 023°54′24.4″E

Map
- Location of Gamal Abdel Nasser Air Base, Libya

Runways
Direction	Length		Surface
Direction	m	ft	Surface
02/20	3,016	9,895	Asphalt
09/27	2,998	9,836	Asphalt
15/33	3,007	9,865	Asphalt

Gamal Abdel Nasser Airbase (Arabic: قاعدة جمال عبد الناصر الجوية, romanized: Qāʿida Ǧamāl ʿAbd an-Nāṣir Ǧawwiyya) is a Libyan Air Force (Arabic: القوات الجوية الليبية, romanized: al-Quwwāt al-Ǧawwiyya al-Lībiyya, Berber: Adwas Alibyan Ujnna) base, located about 16 km south of Tobruk.

Before World War II, it had been an Italian Air Force airfield. A number of the former Italian buildings were seen remaining in 2003, during a courtesy visit by former RAF personnel, at which time no military aircraft were evident.

Prior to 31 March 1970, the airfield was known as Royal Air Force Station El Adem (Arabic: العدم, romanized: al-ʿAdam after the nearby settlement al Adm), and used by the RAF primarily as a staging post. This was for RAF and civil aircraft transiting from bases in Europe to others further East.

== World War II ==
The airfield saw heavy use during the Western Desert Campaign of 1941–42. No. 211 Group RAF made its headquarters at the airfield for several months.

The airfield was largely reconstructed in 1942 by the Royal Air Force (RAF) and brought into operational use again on 12 December 1942. It was used during World War II by the RAF and the United States Army Air Forces (USAAF) during the North African Campaign against German and Italian forces.

RAF units which used the airfield were:

- No 31 Air Stores Park (8 Mar – 10 Apr 1941);
- HQ No 262 Wing (11–20 Dec 1941);
- HQ No 258 Wing (12–xx Dec 1941, 3–xx Feb 1942);
- No. 2 Squadron RAAF (19–21 Dec 1941, 2–3 Feb 1942, 15–17 Feb 1942);
- No 33 Air Stores Park (23 Dec 1941 – 31 Jan 1942);
- No 53 Repair and Salvage Unit (26 Dec 1941 – Feb 1942);
- No. 80 Squadron RAF (28 Dec 1941 – 3 Feb 1942);
- Air Sea Rescue Flt (10–31 Jan 1942);
- No. 73 Squadron RAF (3–18 Feb 1942, 20–27 May 1942, 17–28 Nov 1942);
- No. 94 Squadron RAF (15–17 Feb 1942);
- HQ No 211 Group (12 Mar – xxx 1942)
- No 211 Group Communications Flt (20 Apr 1942 – 17 Sep 1943)
- No. 267 Squadron RAF (Aug 1942 – Jan 1943)
- HQ No 243 Wing (17–xx Nov 1942)
- No. 33 Squadron RAF (18–28 Nov 1942)
- No. 117 Squadron RAF (19 Nov 1942 – 9 Jan 1943)
- No. 213 Squadron RAF (20–25 Nov 1942)
- No. 238 Squadron RAF (20–25 Nov 1942)
- No 12 Staging Post (8 Mar 1943 – 1 Aug 1945)
- HQ No 7 (SAAF) Wing (17 Apr – 18 May 1943)
- No 2915 Sqn RAF Regiment (May 1943 – xxx 194x)
- No. 47 Squadron RAF (14–25 Nov 1943)
- HQ No 240 Wing (28 Dec 1943 – 4 Feb 1944)
- No. 178 Squadron RAF (1 Jan – 1 Mar 1944)
- No. 462 Squadron RAF (1 Jan – 15 Feb 1944)
- No. 336 Squadron RAF (31 Jan – 5 Mar 1944, 15 Jul – 16 Sep 1944)

USAAF Ninth Air Force units which used the airfield were:

- 316th Troop Carrier Group, 10 December 1942–January 1943, Douglas C-47 Skytrain
- 379th Bombardment Squadron, (310th Bombardment Group), 2–26 November 1943, North American B-25 Mitchell

Attached to No 235 Wing, Royal Air Force

== Postwar to British departure ==
Royal Air Force Station El Adem was the fuel stop for the BOAC aircraft carrying the new Queen Elizabeth II on her flight from Entebbe to London on 7 February 1952.

During the first half of 1960, a high-speed low-altitude flying effects evaluation flight, the Swifter Flight, was established at the station. Mainly flying the English Electric Canberra, the flight provided data for use in the TSR.2 programme as well as more general data about such flight profiles. The aircraft had to be specially strengthened.

No. 1564 (Helicopter) Flight was re-formed at El Adem on 14 August 1963, flying Bristol Sycamores and Westland Whirlwinds, from an element of 103 Squadron, disbanding on 31 December 1966 at El Adem. It was re-formed at El Adem again on 1 May 1969, from 'D' Flight of 202 Squadron, only to be disbanded again on 31 March 1970 on Cyprus.

As a group captain, RAF officer Peter Terry was station commander of El Adem, from 1969 to 1970. He was there in September 1969 when Colonel Gaddafi overthrew King Idris of Libya in a coup. Terry oversaw withdrawal of British troops from El Adem and Tobruk in March 1970. He went on to achieve the rank of air chief marshal.

In 1994, the remaining wreckage of Lady Be Good, a USAAF Consolidated B-24 Liberator heavy bomber that crashed-landed deep in the Libyan desert during WWII in 1943, was brought to the air base by a local Libyan team led by Dr. Fadel Ali Mohammed (tasked with recovering the plane wreck) for storage and safekeeping. The remnants of the aircraft still remain there.

Units present 1950s:

- No 1900 AOP Flight (15 January – 1 July 1952)
- No. 249 Squadron RAF (11 March – 3 May 1957)
- Swifter Trials Flight (January–July 1960) - high speed flight evaluation unit
- No 1564 Flight (1 May 1969 – 31 March 1970)
- No. 1 Squadron RAF Regiment

== Current use ==
The airbase is named after the Egyptian revolutionary Gamal Abdel Nasser, who served as President of Egypt. In 2013, the airport was officially reopened as Tobruk International Airport, with flights to Alexandria, Egypt.

== See also ==
- List of North African airfields during World War II

== Sources ==
- Lake, Alan (1999). Flying Units of the RAF. Shrewsbury, Shropshire, UK: Airlife Publishing. ISBN 1-84037-086-6.
- Sturtivant, Ray; Hamlin, John (2007). RAF Flying Training And Support Units since 1912. Tonbridge, Kent, UK: Air-Britain (Historians) Ltd. ISBN 978-0-85130-365-9.
