= Erich Hohagen =

German general and fighter pilot during World War II (1915–1990)

- Born: 9 January 1915; Velbert, Prussia, German Empire
- Died: 8 March 1990 (aged 75); Jever, Lower Saxony, West Germany
- Military career
- Allegiance: Nazi Germany (to 1945); West Germany
- Branch: Luftwaffe; German Air Force
- Service years: 1934–1945; 1956–1974
- Rank: Major (Wehrmacht); Brigadegeneral (Bundeswehr)
- Units: JG 51, JG 2, JG 27, EJG 2, JG 7, JV 44 FSS "S", JG 72
- Commands: 4./JG 51, I./JG 2, I./JG 27, III./JG 7 JG 72
- Conflicts: See battles World War II: Battle of Britain; Barbarossa; Western Front; D-Day; Defense of the Reich
- Awards: Knight's Cross of the Iron Cross

Erich Alfred Hohagen (9 January 1915 – 8 March 1990) was a German general in the Bundeswehr. During World War II, he served as a fighter pilot in the Luftwaffe. A fighter ace, Hohagen was credited with 56 aerial victories and was a recipient of the Knight's Cross of the Iron Cross, the highest award in the military and paramilitary forces of Nazi Germany during World War II.

== Early life and career ==
Hohagen was born on 9 January 1915 in Velbert, at the time in the Rhine Province of the German Empire. He joined the military service of the Luftwaffe in 1938 and following completion of flight and fighter pilot training, (Note: Flight training in the Luftwaffe progressed through the levels A1, A2 and B1, B2, referred to as A/B flight training. A training included theoretical and practical training in aerobatics, navigation, long-distance flights and dead-stick landings. The B courses included high-altitude flights, instrument flights, night landings and training to handle the aircraft in difficult situations.) Hohagen was posted to 4. Staffel (4th squadron) of Jagdgeschwader 51 (JG 51—51st Fighter Wing) in 1939.

== World War II ==
World War II in Europe began on Friday, 1 September 1939, when German forces invaded Poland. Hohagen claimed his first aerial victory, a Royal Air Force (RAF) Supermarine Spitfire over Southern England, on 5 July 1940. On 20 February 1941, Hohagen was appointed Staffelkapitän (squadron leader) of 4. Staffel of JG 51. He succeeded Oberleutnant Josef Fözö who was promoted to command II. Gruppe of JG 51.

=== Operation Barbarossa ===
II. Gruppe of JG 51 was withdrawn from the English Channel in early June 1941 and ordered to Dortmund where the unit was reequipped with the Messerschmitt Bf 109 F series. On 10 June, II. Gruppe began transferring east and was located at Siedlce. On 22 June, German forces launched Operation Barbarossa, the German invasion of the Soviet Union. JG 51, under the command of Oberstleutnant Werner Mölders, was subordinated to II. Fliegerkorps (2nd Air Corps), which as part of Luftflotte 2 (Air Fleet 2). JG 51 area of operation during Operation Barbarossa was over the right flank of Army Group Center in the combat area of the 2nd Panzer Group as well as the 4th Army.

On the first day of the invasion, Hohagen shot down three Soviet SB-2 bombers in the space of five minutes. In August, he was given command of II. Gruppe after its former acting commander Hauptmann Hubertus von Bonin was wounded on 8 August. On 4 September, Hohagen was shot down in his Messerschmitt Bf 109 F-2 (Werknummer 9211—factory number) by Soviet fighters near Bryansk. Wounded, he transferred command of II. Gruppe to Oberleutnant Hartmann Grasser. Hohagen received the Knight's Cross of the Iron Cross (Ritterkreuz des Eisernen Kreuzes) on 5 October 1941, after 30 victories.

=== Training assignment and Western Front ===
Following a lengthy period of convalescence, Hohagen was posted to a Jagdfliegerschule on 1 March 1942. On 1 September, he was placed in command of the Jagdlehrer-Überprüfungsstaffel, a squadron responsible for the evaluation of fighter pilot instructors.

On 1 November 1942, Hohagen was posted to Jagdgeschwader 2 "Richthofen" (JG 2—2nd Fighter Wing), taking command of its 7. Staffel. The Staffel was subordinated to III. Gruppe of JG 2 headed by Hauptmann Egon Mayer. On 7 April, Hohagen was transferred to Jagdgeschwader 27 (JG 27—27th Fighter Wing) where he was appointed Gruppenkommandeur (group commander) of I. Gruppe. He succeeded Hauptmann Hans-Joachim Heinecke who temporarily led the Gruppe after Hauptmann Heinrich Setz had been killed in action on 13 March. On 1 June, Hohagen became a victim of friendly fire when he was shot down in his Bf 109 G-6 (Werknummer 16391) 8 kilometers (5.0 miles) north of Marquise, a village approximately 12 kilometers (7.5 miles) north-northeast of Boulogne-sur-Mer. He successfully bailed out, taking to his parachute, but was injured in the incident. The pilot that shot him down was Hauptmann Wilhelm Steinmann, also from JG 27, who misidentified Hohagen's Bf 109 for a Spitfire fighter. Due to his injuries, Hohagen was temporarily replaced by Hauptmann Hans Remmer before Hauptmann Ludwig Franzisket officially took command of I. Gruppe of JG 27 on 15 July.

Hohagen was appointed Gruppenkommandeur of I. Gruppe of JG 2 in August 1943. He replaced Major Helmut-Felix Bolz who was transferred. On 16 September 1943, Hohagen, was piloting an Focke-Wulf Fw 190 A-6 fighter (Werknummer 550532) when his aircraft was hit by the defensive fire of a Boeing B-17 Flying Fortress bomber. Hohagen was again wounded and made a forced landing near Rennes, France. On 28 September 1944, Hohagen was severely injured, sustaining a skull fracture, when the engine of his Fw 190 A-8 (Werknummer 171559) failed, resulting in a forced landing near the airfield at Merzhausen. He was succeeded by Major Walter Matoni as commander of I. Gruppe.

=== Flying the Messerschmitt Me 262 ===
In late 1944, Hohagen was posted to III. Gruppe of Ergänzungs-Jagdgeschwader 2 (EJG 2—2nd Supplementary Training Wing), a training unit based at Lechfeld Airfiled. There, he learned to fly the new Messerschmitt Me 262 jet aircraft. He was then posted to Jagdgeschwader 7 "Nowotny" (JG 7—7th Fighter Wing) "Nowotny", the first operational jet fighter wing which was named after Walter Nowotny. Kommando Nowotny had been assessing the Me 262 under operational conditions. Nowotny himself was killed in action while flying the Me 262 on 8 November. On 12 November, the Oberkommando der Luftwaffe (OKL—Air Force High Command) ordered JG 7 to be equipped with the Me 262 and Oberst Johannes Steinhoff became its first Geschwaderkommodore (wing commander). On 19 November, the remnants of Kommando Nowotny became the nucleus of III. Gruppe of JG 7. Placed under the command of Hohagen, III. Gruppe began assembling aircraft and personnel at Lechfeld Air Field. In the latter months of 1944 Hohagen helped to convert pilots to the new jets. On 21 January, Steinhoff was replaced by Major Theodor Weissenberger as Geschwaderkommodore of JG 7, while Hohagen was replaced by Major Rudolf Sinner as Gruppenkommandeur of III. Gruppe.

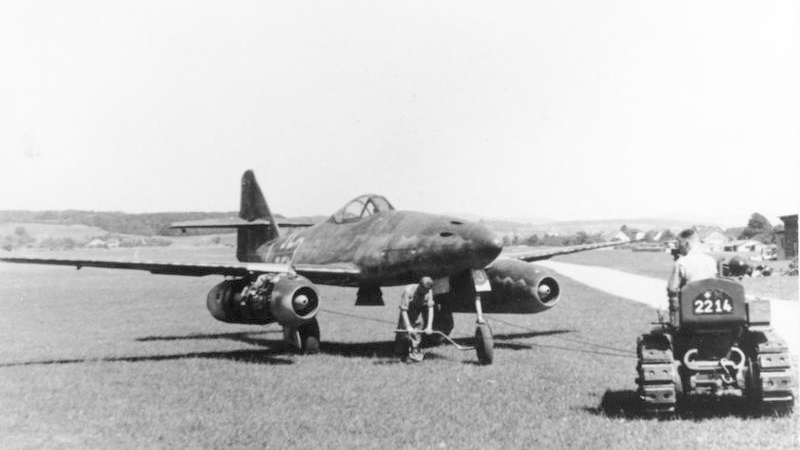
Me 262 A, circa 1944

On 24 February 1945, Generalleutnant Adolf Galland and Steinhoff recruited Hohagen and Major Karl-Heinz Schnell from hospital to join the new Jagdverband 44 (JV 44—44th Fighter Detachment) forming at Brandenburg-Briest. Galland had received permission to create and staff the unorthodox fighter group from Luftwaffe Chief, Reichsmarschall Hermann Göring. JV 44 received its first Me 262 aircraft by 14 March. On 31 March, JV 44 moved to Munich-Riem Airfield.

Hohagen became the Technical Officer for JV 44 and assisted with the conversion of newly arriving pilots to the Me 262. The unit transferred to München-Riem on 31 March 1945. He served as JV 44's Technical Officer until the crash of Steinhoff on 18 April 1945, and Hohagen replaced the injured Steinhoff as the unit's Einsatzchef (Operations Chief).

On 28 April, Galland moved JV 44 to Maxglan Airfield, near Salzburg. There they surrendered to U.S. forces on 4 May. Hohagen and other pilots were taken to a makeshift prisoner of war camp near Bad Aibling. Five days later, a U.S. officer was looking for JV 44 pilots and Hohagen, Schnell, Gerhard Barkhorn, Walter Krupinski, and Waldemar Wübke stepped up.

== Later life and service ==
Following World War II, Hohagen joined the newly created German Air Force, at the time referred to as the Bundesluftwaffe. On 30 March 1957, he was given command of 2. Ausbildungsstaffel (2nd training squadron) of Flugzeugführerschule "S" (FFS S—Pilot Training School "S") at Memmingen Air Field. He led this training unit until 31 March 1958. From November 1959 to October 1961, he commanded Jagdgeschwader 72 as Geschwaderkommodore, a unit which in October 1964 became Jagdbombergeschwader 43 (JaboG 43—43rd Fighter Bomber Wing). He was succeeded by Oberstleutnant Friedrich Obleser in this capacity. On 16 February 1963, Hohagen replaced Oberst Herbert Wehnelt as commander of the Waffenschule der Luftwaffe 10 (WaSLw 10—Air Force Weapons School 10). He served in the role until 15 August 1967 when he was succeeded by Oberst Ulrich Pieper. In April 1968, Hohagen was promoted to Brigadegeneral (brigadier general). Until 30 September 1971, he served as department chief of Rüstung und Waffensysteme (Armaments and Weapon Systems) in the Führungsstab der Luftwaffe (German Air Staff). He died on 8 March 1990 at the age of 75 in Jever.

== Summary of career ==
=== Aerial victory claims ===
According to US historian David T. Zabecki, Hohagen was credited with 56 aerial victories. Obermaier also lists him with 56 aerial victories claimed in over 500 combat missions. This figure includes 20 claims on the Eastern Front, and 36 on the Western Front, 13 of them being four-engined bombers and one while flying the Me 262 jet fighter. Mathews and Foreman, authors of Luftwaffe Aces — Biographies and Victory Claims, researched the German Federal Archives and state that he claimed at least 49 aerial victories, plus two further unconfirmed claims. This number includes 20 on the Eastern Front and more than 29 on the Western Front, including at least eight four-engined bombers.

Victory claims were logged to a map-reference (PQ = Planquadrat), for example "PQ 14 West 3884". The Luftwaffe grid map (Jägermeldenetz) covered all of Europe, western Russia and North Africa and was composed of rectangles measuring 15 minutes of latitude by 30 minutes of longitude, an area of about 360 square miles (930 km^{2}). These sectors were then subdivided into 36 smaller units to give a location area 3 km × 4 km (1.9 mi × 2.5 mi) in size.

Chronicle of aerial victories
This and the – (dash) indicates unwitnessed aerial victory claims for which Hohagen did not receive credit. This along with the & (ampersand) indicates a endgültige Vernichtung (final destruction)—a coup de grâce inflicted on an already damaged heavy bomber. This and the ? (question mark) indicates information discrepancies listed by Prien, Stemmer, Rodeike, Bock, Mathews and Foreman.
Claim	Date	Time	Type	Location	Claim	Date	Time	Type	Location
– 4. Staffel of Jagdgeschwader 51 – Action at the Channel and over England — 26 June 1940 – 7 June 1941
1? (Note: According to Mathews and Foreman this claim is unconfirmed.)	5 July 1940	—	Spitfire	north of Hythe	7	29 October 1940	17:55	Spitfire	south of London
2	9 July 1940	21:45	Spitfire	northeast of Dover	8	5 November 1940	16:00	Spitfire	north of London
3?	10 July 1940	—	Spitfire	east of Ramsgate	9	5 November 1940	16:03	Spitfire	north of London
4	31 July 1940	16:58	Spitfire	west of Dover	10	1 December 1940	12:20	Hurricane	west of London
5	16 August 1940	13:22	Spitfire	Herne Bay	11	21 May 1941	17:55	Hurricane	20 km (12 mi) northwest of Dunkirk
6	26 August 1940	13:16	Spitfire	Canterbury					
– 4. Staffel of Jagdgeschwader 51 – Operation Barbarossa — 22 June – August 1941
12	22 June 1941	09:32	SB-2		20	12 July 1941	07:55	Pe-2	
13	22 June 1941	09:35	SB-2		21	13 July 1941	10:05	DB-3	
14	22 June 1941	09:37	SB-2		22	13 July 1941	10:20	I-16	
15	25 June 1941	18:07	SB-2		23	24 July 1941	11:17	V-11 (Il-2)	
16	29 June 1941	18:10	SB-2? (Note: According to Mathews and Foreman claimed as an Polikarpov R-5.)		24	26 July 1941	19:01	I-18 (MiG-1)	
17	30 June 1941	16:15	R-10 (Seversky)		25	30 July 1941	16:35	I-61 (MiG-3)	
18	2 July 1941	16:47	I-16		26	11 August 1941	14:46	I-61 (MiG-3)	
19	9 July 1941	19:35	V-11? (Note: According to Mathews and Foreman claimed as a Seversky aircraft of unknown type.)						
– Stab II. Gruppe of Jagdgeschwader 51 – Operation Barbarossa — August – 4 September 1941
27	18 August 1941	08:05	I-61? (Note: According to Mathews and Foreman claimed as a Polikarpov I-16.)		30	2 September 1941	06:35	V-11 (Il-2)	5 km (3.1 mi) south of Sechtschinskaja
28	22 August 1941	07:30	I-61 (MiG-3)		31	2 September 1941	06:40	V-11 (Il-2)	5 km (3.1 mi) southeast of Sechtschinskaja
29	25 August 1941	12:50	SB-3	south of Gomel					
– 7. Staffel of Jagdgeschwader 2 "Richthofen" – Western Front — 1 January – 7 April 1943
32	3 January 1943	11:37	B-17	PQ 14 West 3884	35	13 February 1943	09:55	Spitfire	north of Boulogne
33	23 January 1943	13:48	B-17	PQ 14 West 4826	36	15 February 1943	16:04	B-24	15 km (9.3 mi) east of Dover
34? (Note: This claim is not listed by Prien, Stemmer, Rodeike, Bock.)	23 January 1943	14:08	B-17	PQ 14 West 4967	37 (Note: Although Hohagen was already appointed Grppenkommandeur of I. Gruppe of JG 27, this claim was attributed to the 7. Staffel of JG 2.)	21 April 1943	12:19	Ventura	4 km (2.5 mi) west of Baie de Somme
– Stab I. Gruppe of Jagdgeschwader 27 – Western Front — 7 April – 1 June 1943
— ? (Note: According to Mathews and Foreman this claim was confirmed.)	13 May 1943	16:20	B-17&	south of Abbeville	38	25 May 1943	10:58	B-25	Boulogne/Baie de Somme
– Stab I. Gruppe of Jagdgeschwader 2 "Richthofen" – Western Front — August – 31 December 1943
39	27 August 1943	19:50	B-17	Pleunier; Reims	42? (Note: This claim is not listed by Mathews and Foreman.)	6 September 1943	13:00	B-17	5 km (3.1 mi) southwest of Compiègne
40	6 September 1943	12:14	B-17	PQ 04 Ost CH-6, northwest of Troyes	43	6 September 1943	15:03	Boston	PQ 05 Ost 0165
41?	6 September 1943	13:00	B-17	southwest of Meaux	44	14 October 1943	15:55	B-17	southwest of Verdun
– Stab I. Gruppe of Jagdgeschwader 2 "Richthofen" – Western Front — 1944
45?	5 January 1944	10:47	B-17		51	15 June 1944	06:42	Spitfire	PQ 05 Ost UC-8 vicinity of Évreux
46?	5 January 1944	11:12	B-17		52	22 June 1944	14:33	P-47	PQ 15 West US vicinity of Saint-Lô
47	13 May 1944	12:18	P-47	PQ 05 Ost DU-4 northwest of Paris	53	24 June 1944	12:22	P-51	PQ 05 Ost UB vicinity of Bernay
48	6 June 1944	17:25	Typhoon	PQ 05 Ost UB, Beaumont-le-Roger	54	29 June 1944	08:02	P-47	PQ 04 Ost N/AC-5 vicinity of Dreux
49	12 June 1944	06:10	P-47	PQ 04 Ost N/AC-3 vicinity of Dreux	55	27 August 1944	14:31	P-47	PQ 04 Ost N/AF/BF east of Paris
50	14 June 1944	06:44	P-51	PQ 05 Ost UC-1 vicinity of Évreux					

=== Awards ===
- Iron Cross (1939) 2nd and 1st Class
- Knight's Cross of the Iron Cross on 5 October 1941 as Oberleutnant and Staffelkapitän of the 4./Jagdgeschwader 51 (Note: According to Scherzer on 6 October 1941 as leader of the II./Jagdgeschwader 51.)
- German Cross in Gold on 25 December 1943 as Hauptmann in the II./Jagdgeschwader 51.

== Notes ==
Military offices
Preceded by Major Walter Nowotny	Commander of Kommando Nowotny; 8 November 1944 – 19 November 1944	Succeeded by disbanded
Preceded by none	Commander of Jagdgeschwader 72; 11 November 1959 – October 1961	Succeeded by Oberstleutnant Friedrich Obleser
