= Westphalian Museum of Natural History =

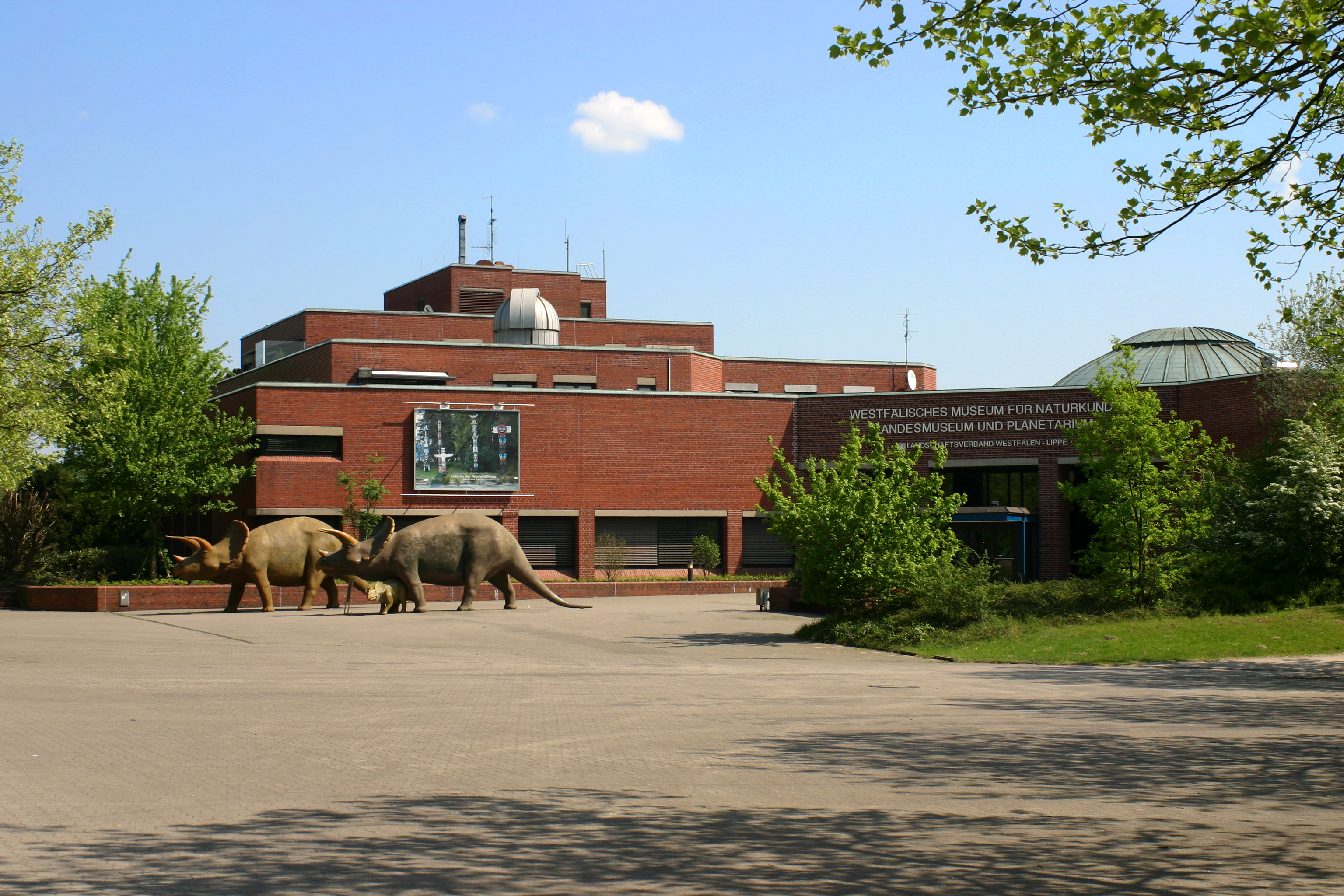
- Location: Germany
- Coordinates: 51°56′58″N 7°35′28″E
- Website: www.lwl-naturkundemuseum-muenster.de/en/,%20https://www.lwl-naturkundemuseum-muenster.de/de/
- Location of Westphalian Museum of Natural History

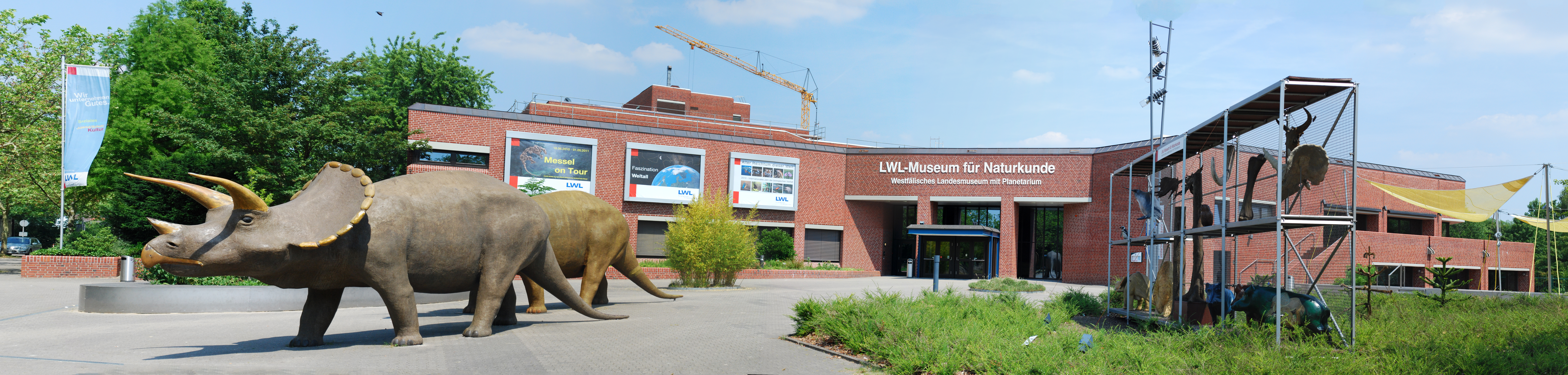
Entrance Area of the museum of natural history

The Westphalian Museum of Natural History (German: Westfälische Museum für Naturkunde) is a natural history museum in Münster, Germany.

== Exhibits ==
- Of coming and going - fauna from or once were from Westphalia
- Dinosaurs
- Survivalist human - About humanity
- Animally individual

== Directors ==
- 1892–1905: Hermann Landois
- 1907–1915: Hermann Reker
- 1915–1919: Rudolph Koch (provisional)
- 1919–1933: Hermann Reichling
- 1937–1956: Bernhard Rensch
- 1956–1984: Ludwig Franzisket
- 1984–2016: Alfred Hendricks
- since 2016: Jan Ole Kriegs

== See also ==
- List of museums in Germany
- List of natural history museums
