= Quotaifiyah Airfield Complex =

Quotaiyfiyah Airfield Complex
- Matrouh Governorate in Egypt

Site information
- Type: Military airfield
- Operator: Luftwaffe; Royal Air Force
- Condition: Abandoned

Location
- Shown within Egypt
- Coordinates: 31°03′56″N 28°17′59″E

Site history
- In use: 1940 - 1942
- Battles/wars: North African Campaign

Garrison information
- Garrison: Wach-Bataillon der Luftwaffe Oberbefehlshaber Süd I

Airfields of the Quotaifiyah Complex

Quotaifiyah Airfield Complex (LG-20) was a military cluster of airfields used during World War II. It was located 15 km (9.3 mi) west of El Daba in Matrouh Governorate, Egypt.

== History ==
Quotaifiyah Airfield was operated by the Royal Air Force (RAF) before the beginning of World War II. It was located on top of a cliff facing towards the sea. In July 1940, RAF Blenheims were based at the airfield, followed by South African Air Force Marylands in November 1941. It had minimal infrastructure, and only tents were provided to house personnel. Airmen often surfed and fished along the beach provided by the airfield's ideal proximity. However, these activities would also associate non-service related risks. During one occasion, Leading Aircraftman James Edward Fryatt almost drowned. At some point, the beach was made restricted to airmen, a decision that rankled those who frequented there.

=== German usage ===
In late June 1942, the airfield was captured by Axis forces and operational fighter units of the Luftwaffe began arriving by July. Immediately after occupation, the airfield was strafed by 4 Allied Beaufighters, claiming two Ju 87s on 1 July. Four days later, it was bombed and strafed by Royal Australian Air Force Kittyhawks, damaging multiple Bf 109 F-4s of the III. /JG 53. Throughout 1942, the airfield was continuously bombed, destroying numerous Junkers Ju 87s, Junkers Ju 88s, and Bf 109 F-4s. The II. Gruppe of Jadgdeschwader arrived at the airfield on 2 July, At the time of arrival, the airfield was considered makeshift.

Personally ordered by Generalfeldmarschall Albert Kesselring, an officer with 60 construction troops arrived at the airfield complex on 13 October 1942. The team constructed aircraft blast bays to protect combat aircraft from Allied fire. Through October 1942, the complex was used by three squadrons of the fighter-based Jagdgeschwader 27. As Allied advance encroached towards Quotaifiyah, the Luftwaffe began evacuating the airfield. On 4 November 1942, six Bf 109 F-4/G-2s and 1 Bf 108 B-2 from II. /JG 27 were blown up to prevent capture. Two days later, the Luftwaffe evacuated the airfield, leaving up to 30 burning Bf 109s. Afterwards, RAF units began moving in on 7 November.

On 25 January, 1944, all airfields were reported to be abandoned.

== Facilities ==
Quotaifiyah I Airfield composed of three airstrips, measuring approximately 1,190 m (3,900 ft) long, 950 m (3,120 ft) long, and 1,050 m (3,440 ft) long, with all airstrips measuring 185 m (607 ft) wide. The total size of the landing ground measured 1,240 m × 1,120 m (4,070 ft × 3,670 ft). Ample space was provided for the installation of aircraft parking pens, the same case for all three airfields.

== Units ==
The following units that were based at Quotaifiyah Airfield Complex:

Luftwaffe

- I. Gruppe, Jagdgeschwader 27, July 1942 — October 1942
- II. Gruppe, Jagdgeschwader 27, July 1942 — October 1942
- III. Gruppe, Jagdgeschwader 27, July 1942 — July 1942
- 10. (Jabo) Staffel, Jagdgeschwader 27, July 1942 — July 1942
- III. Gruppe, Jagdgeschwader 53, July 1942 — October 1942
- 10. (Jabo) Staffel, Jagdgeschwader 53, July 1942 — July 1942
- 1. Wüstennotstaffel, June/July 1942 — November 1942
- Kurierstaffel Afrika, July/August 1942 — October 1942

Luftwaffe (non-flying units)

- Fliegerhorst-Kommandantur E 20/VI, August 1942 — November 1942
- Gefechtsstand Oberbefehlshaber Süd (Antonius 4), September 1942 — September 1942
- elements of leichte Flak-Abteilung 841 (mot), October 1942 — October 1942
- elements of leichte Flak-Abteilung 914, October 1942 — October 1942
- elements of Luftwaffen-Bau-Bataillon 21/XI, September 1942 — October 1942
- Stab, 1., 2. Kompanie, Wach-Bataillon der Luftwaffe Oberbefehlshaber Süd I, September 1942 — September 1942

== See also ==
- El Daba Airfield Complex
