= Krefeld Airfield =

Former German military airfield

Krefeld Airfield Advanced Landing Ground Y-61 Fliegerhorst Krefeld
- Krefeld Airfield (Germany)

Site information
- Type: Military Airfield

Location
- Coordinates: 51°21′16″N 006°37′01″E

Site history
- In use: 1917-1950
- Battles/wars: Western Front (World War II)

Krefeld Airfield is a former military airfield, located 4.2 km northeast of Krefeld in North Rhine-Westphalia, Germany.

== History ==
Airfield construction began, after much debate, as a Deutsche Luftstreitkräfte military airfield during World War I in 1916 It consisted of 8 Hangars, a maintenance hangar, a fuel depot, and a railway connection. In 1917 it was completed and leased to the German Reich at no cost. A provision was made however that the land would be returned to its original civilian owners if the airfield did not exist anymore in 30 years time. The provision ran from 1 April 1916 until 31 March 1945. After World War I the airfield was occupied by Belgian and French military forces. in 1925 the hangars were taken apart and transported to Belgium.

After the occupying forces had left the city of Krefeld took control over the airfield as a civil airport, and on 2 February 1926, the first German civil aircraft landed at the airfield. By the middle of May air service Krefeld-Essen-Berlin was started, and soon the service from Krefeld was taken over by Lufthansa. Connections to Essen and Cologne ensured connections to 93 other airports. In 1926 135 passengers and 850 kilos of freight were transported, but 4 years later this had increased to 960 passengers and 32,559 kilos of freight.

During World War II Krefeld became a Luftwaffe Fliegerhorst, and was home to JG 1 and JG 52. The United States Army moved into the area in April 1945 and was converted by IX Engineering Command, Ninth Air Force into an Army Air Forces advanced Landing Ground, designated Y-61. Air Force units used the airfield as a casualty evacuation and combat resupply airfield by the IX Air Service Command. After the German Capitulation on 8 May, it was re-designated as "Army Air Forces Station Krefeld". It was used during May and June 1945 as a Tactical Air Depot for the storage and destruction of former Luftwaffe Aircraft. Army Air Forces units moved out on 15 June, turning the field over to the British as part of the British Occupation zone of Germany.

The British found the airfield of little use. The rise of the jet engine meant the airfield was not large enough, and it had no room for expansion. They only used parts of the terrain as a barracks, the rest was returned to agricultural use. In 1947 a request was made with the Allied military to release the terrain for civilian use, and in 1950 the former airfield was released to the city of Krefeld.

Today there is little evidence of the airfield with the exception of a small memorial of the former airfield (51° 21' 46.55" N 6° 37' 0.48" E)
