= Fels am Wagram =

- Municipality
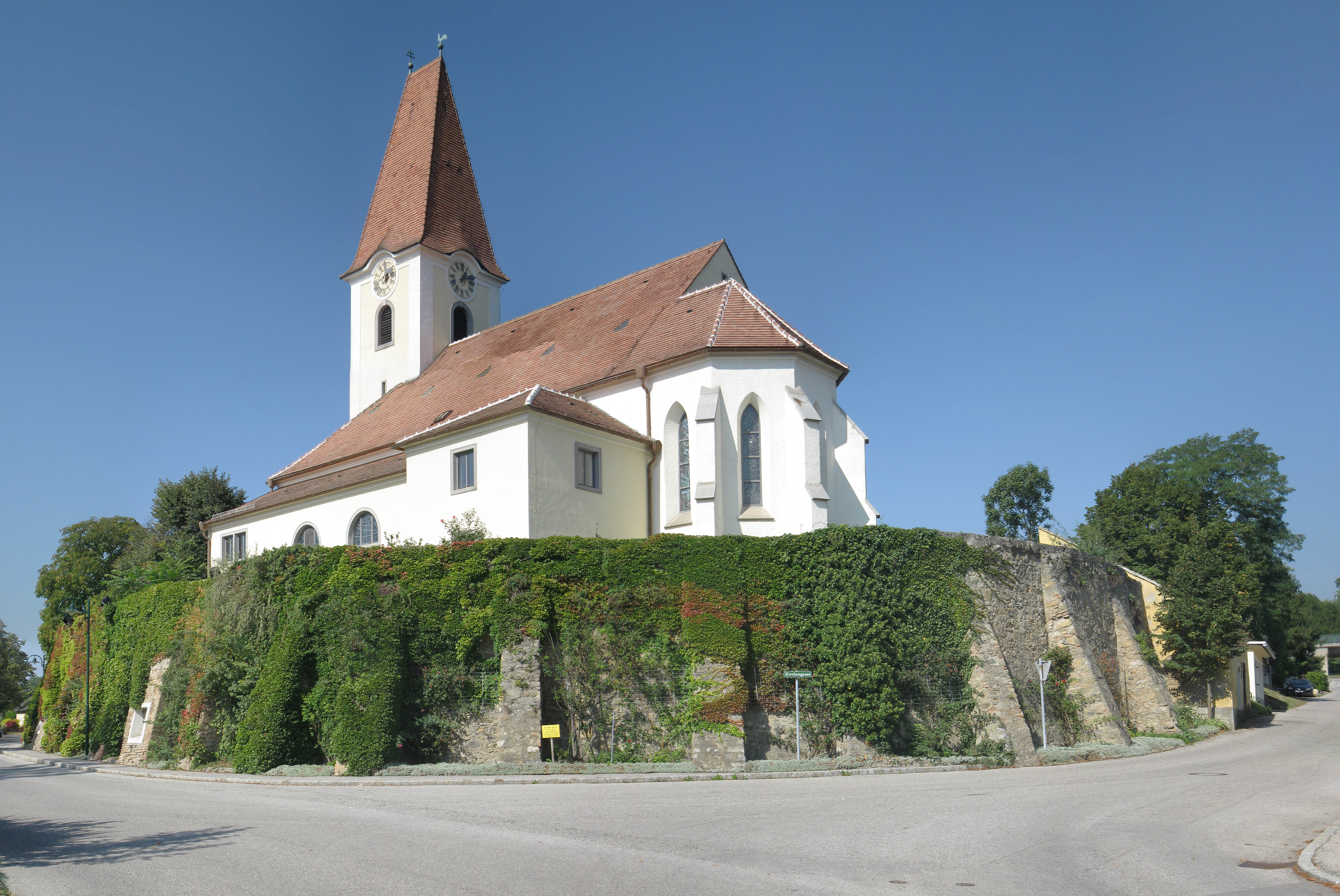
- Fels am Wagram parish church

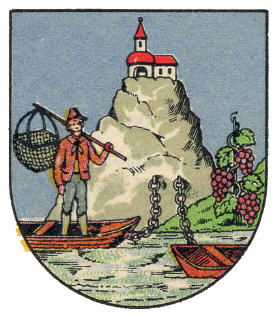
- Coat of arms

- Location within Austria
- Coordinates: 48°26′19″N 15°49′03″E
- Country: Austria
- State: Lower Austria
- District: Tulln

Government
  - Mayor: Christian Bauer (ÖVP)

Area
  - Total: 29.51 km^{2} (11.39 sq mi)
- Elevation: 208 m (682 ft)

Population (2018-01-01)
  - Total: 2,318
  - Density: 78.55/km^{2} (203.4/sq mi)
- Time zone: UTC+1 (CET)
  - Summer (DST): UTC+2 (CEST)
- Postal code: 3481
- Area code: 02738
- Vehicle registration: TU
- Website: www.fels-wagram.at

Fels am Wagram is a municipality in the district of Tulln in the Austrian state of Lower Austria.

== Population ==
Historical population
Year	Pop.	±%
1971	1,925	—
1981	1,850	−3.9%
1991	1,848	−0.1%
2001	1,966	+6.4%
