= Gazala =

Gazala عين الغزالة ʿAyn al-Ġazāla
- Village
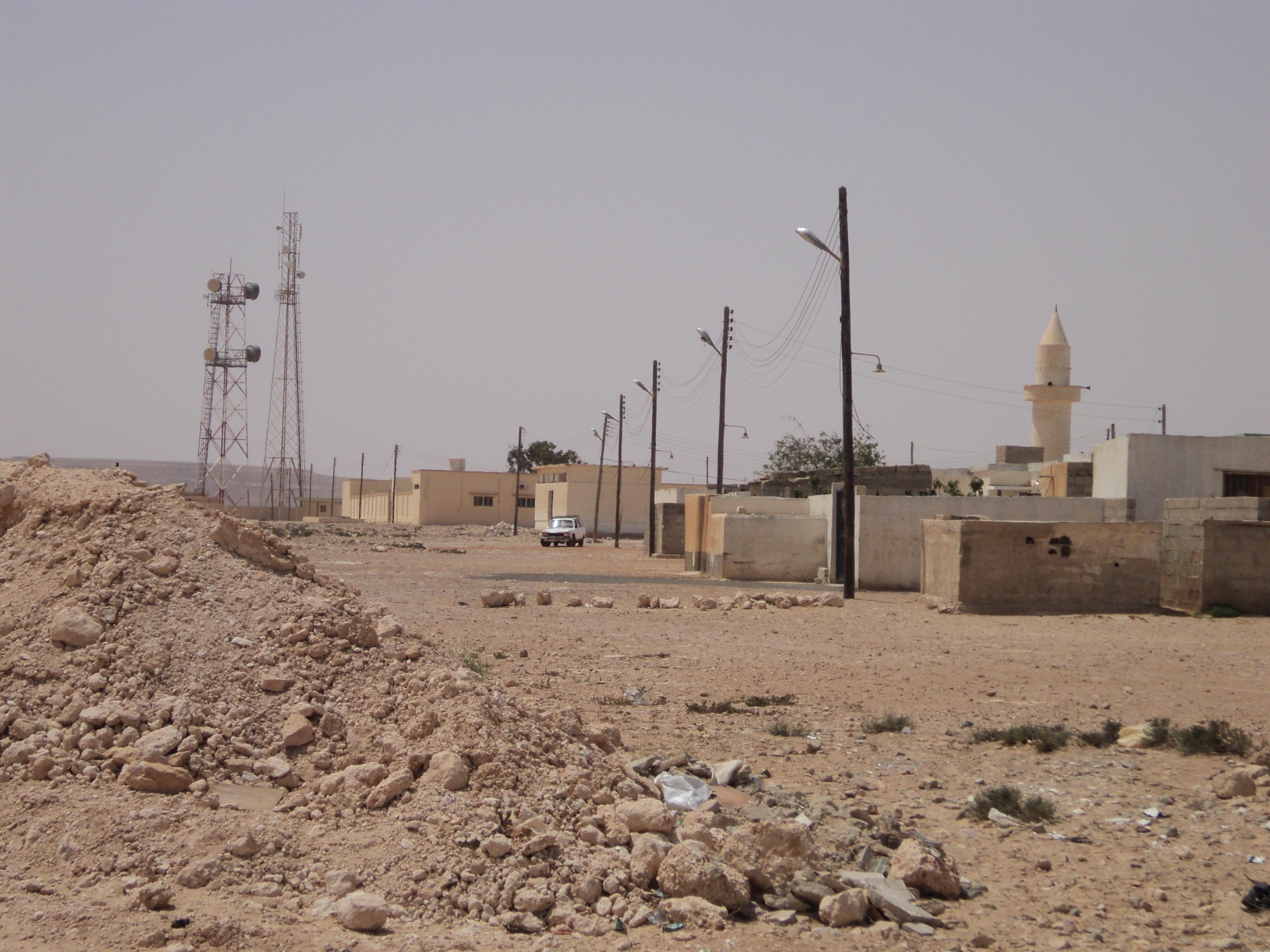

- Location in Libya
- Coordinates: 32°08′43″N 23°21′27″E
- Country: Libya
- District: Butnan
- Time zone: UTC+2 (EET)

Gazala, or ʿAyn al-Ġazāla (Arabic: عين الغزالة, lit. 'Spring of the female Gazelle/the Rising Sun'), is a small Libyan village near the coast in the northeastern portion of the country. It is located 60 kilometres (37 mi) west of Tobruk.

== History ==
In the late 1930s (during the Italian occupation of Libya), the village was the site of an Arab concentration camp, which the men of the Senussi resistance tried in vain to penetrate.

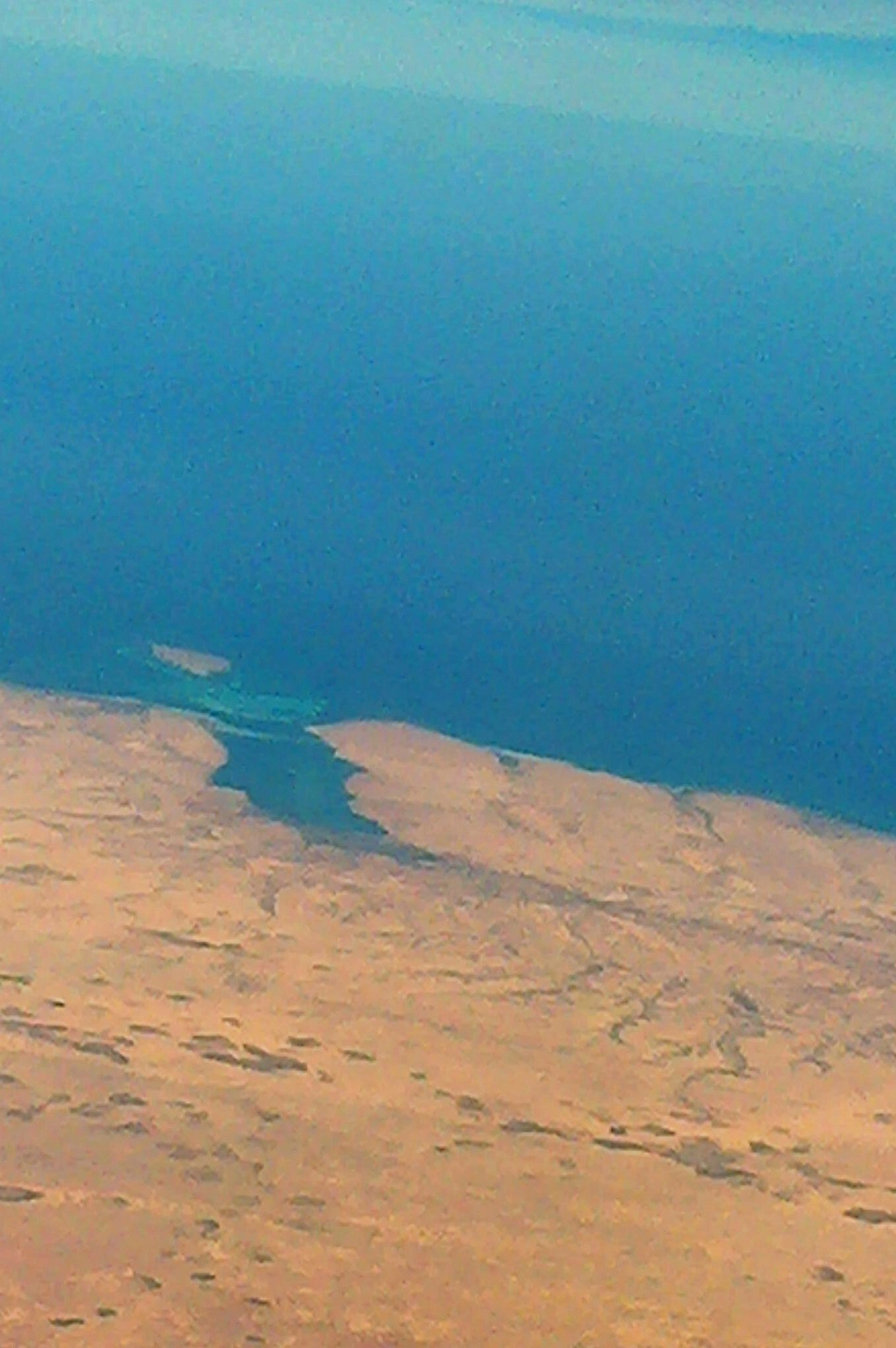
A bay and a small island near Ain el Gazala (Aerial photo).

Gazala is perhaps best known for the memorable World War II battle that took place in the surrounding area from May to June 1942 between Axis forces (led by Erwin Rommel) and Allied forces (led by Neil Ritchie). This battle resulted in an Axis victory and the subsequent capture of Tobruk on 21 June 1942.
