= Al Adm =

Al Adm العدم al-ʿAdam El Adem
- Town
- Location in Libya
- Coordinates: 31°51′49″N 23°55′31″E
- Country: Libya
- District: Butnan
- Time zone: UTC+2 (EET)

Al Adm (Arabic: العدم, romanized: al-ʿAdam other transliterations include El Adem, Al `Adam, Al ‘Adam, Al `Adm, or Al ‘Aḑm) is a town in the Butnan District, of Libya. It is located roughly 22 kilometres south of the district's capital Tobruk.

The Gamal Abdul El Nasser Air Base, once known as Royal Air Force Station El Adem is located near this town.

== Climate ==
Climate data for Al 'Adm
Month	Jan	Feb	Mar	Apr	May	Jun	Jul	Aug	Sep	Oct	Nov	Dec	Year
Mean daily maximum °C (°F)	17 (63)	19 (66)	21 (70)	24 (76)	28 (82)	31 (87)	31 (88)	32 (89)	29 (85)	27 (81)	24 (75)	19 (66)	25 (77)
Mean daily minimum °C (°F)	7 (44)	7 (45)	9 (48)	12 (53)	15 (59)	18 (65)	20 (68)	21 (69)	18 (65)	16 (60)	12 (54)	8 (47)	13 (56)
Average precipitation mm (inches)	23 (0.9)	18 (0.7)	10 (0.4)	0 (0)	5.1 (0.2)	0 (0)	0 (0)	0 (0)	2.5 (0.1)	13 (0.5)	5.1 (0.2)	20 (0.8)	97 (3.8)
Source: Weatherbase
