= Gustav Rödel =

German general and flying ace (1915–1995)

- Rödel as Oberst
- Born: 24 October 1915; Merseburg
- Died: 6 February 1995 (aged 79); Bonn-Bad Godesberg
- Burial place: Cemetery Rüngsdorf; Section II–Grave 708
- Military career
- Allegiance: Nazi Germany; West Germany
- Branch: Luftwaffe; German Air Force
- Service years: 1936–1945; 1957–1971
- Rank: Oberst (Wehrmacht); Brigadegeneral (Bundeswehr)
- Commands: JG 27
- Conflicts: See battles Spanish Civil War World War II: Invasion of Poland; Battle of France; Battle of Britain; Balkans Campaign; Operation Barbarossa; North African Campaign; Defense of the Reich
- Awards: Knight's Cross of the Iron Cross with Oak Leaves

Gustav Siegfried Rödel (24 October 1915 – 6 February 1995) was a German fighter pilot and fighter ace who served during World War II in the Luftwaffe.

Rödel was born on 24 October 1915 in Saxony. In 1933 the Nazis came to power in Germany. Rödel had to choose a military career and he applied to join the Luftwaffe in late 1935 and was accepted the following year. After basic training he was selected to train as a fighter pilot. In 1938 Rödel completed his training and was assigned to Jagdgruppe 88, under the command of the Condor Legion. J/88 participated in the Spanish Civil War. There is no record of Rödel claiming any success in combat in Spain. In July 1939, Rödel was sent to Jagdgeschwader 21 (JG 21).

On 1 September 1939, Nazi Germany attacked Poland beginning World War II in Europe. Operating with 2. Staffel (2nd Squadron) he claimed his first aerial victory on this day. In November 1939 he was transferred to Jagdgeschwader 27 and saw action in the Battle of Belgium and Battle of France in May and June 1940. Rödel claimed three aircraft shot down. In July 1940 Rödel was moved to 4./JG 27 and eventually appointed Staffelkapitän (Squadron Leader) of the Staffel effective from 1 September 1940. Rödel was credited with 10 Royal Air Force (RAF) aircraft in the Battle of Britain.

In March 1941 Rödel was transferred to the Mediterranean theatre. Rödel served with JG 27 through the Battle of Greece and received credit for six aerial victories. In June 1941 Rödel was briefly posted to the Eastern Front to support Operation Barbarossa. He claimed only one victory in the Soviet Union. For his success he was awarded the Knight's Cross of the Iron Cross on 25 June 1941. Rödel was posted to North Africa with JG 27 soon after and remained there until November 1942.

On 22 April he was appointed Geschwaderkommodore (Wing Commander) of JG 27. Subsequently, Rödel saw action over Sicily and Southern Italy in May 1943. On 20 June 1943 he was awarded the Oak Leaves to the Knight's Cross for 78 victories. In October 1943, JG 27 moved to Nazi Germany for Defence of the Reich operations and in June 1944 led the wing in the Battle of Normandy. He claimed his 98th and final victory on 5 July 1944. In December 1944 he served as a staff officer with the 2. Jagd Division until the German surrender in May 1945.

Rödel was credited with 97 victories against the Western Allies and a single victory over Soviet Air Forces in over 980 combat missions. He flew the Messerschmitt Bf 109. In 1957, Rödel joined the Bundeswehr. He retired on 30 September 1971, holding the rank of Brigadegeneral.

== Early life and career ==
Rödel was born on 24 October 1915 in Merseburg in the Kingdom of Saxony, a federated state of the German Empire. He was the son of Wilhelm Rödel, a metal worker. Following graduation from school with his Abitur (university-preparatory high school diploma), he completed his compulsory Reichsarbeitsdienst (Reich Labour Service) in Zeitz. Rödel then studied half a semester of theology before joining the military service of the Luftwaffe as a Fahnenjunker (cadet) on 1 April 1936. He then attended the Luftkriegsschule Klotzsche (Air War School Klotzsche) until 31 January 1938.

On 1 February 1938, Rödel was promoted to Lieutenant (second lieutenant) and transferred to the Jagdfliegerschule (fighter pilot school) at Werneuchen, at the time under the command of Oberstleutnant (Lieutenant-Colonel) Theodor Osterkamp. From 1 May until 30 June 1938, he was assigned to the school's 2. Staffel (2nd squadron) and completed its second training course held to date. In 1939, he flew his first combat missions with Jagdgruppe 88 (J/88—88th Fighter Group) of the Condor Legion during the Spanish Civil War. There, he predominantly flew escort and close air support missions. In Spain, he was also tasked with the exhumation and identification of German dead. He also learned to speak Spanish and was employed as an interpreter. For his service in Spain, Rödel was awarded the Spanish Cross in Bronze with Swords (Spanienkreuz in Bronze mit Schwertern) on 6 June 1939.

== World War II ==
On 1 September 1939 the German Wehrmacht invaded Poland. 2./JG 21 was based at Heiligenbeil, East Prussia. On the opening day Rödel claimed a PZL P.24, which was a misidentified PZL P.7 or P.11c of the Pursuit Brigade based at Okęcie Warszawa. (Note: According to Lydzba, basing on the time 17:08, it was probably either a PZL P.7a flown by kapitan Mieczysław Olszewski (a commander of the 123 EM) or a PZL P.11c flown by podporucznik Anatol Piotrowski (the 152 EM); both were killed in action.) After the campaign, I./JG 21 was used to form the second and third Gruppen of JG 27, founded on 1 October 1939.

On 10 May 1940 JG 27 supported Army Group A and B's invasion of Belgium. Rödel was part of I./JG 27, attached to VIII. Fliegerkorps (8th Air Corps). Rödel was assigned as Adolf Galland's wingman. On 12 May Stab./JG 27 was patrolling near Huy led by Galland. The Stabsschwarm claimed four Royal Air Force (RAF) Hawker Hurricanes, one of them was claimed by Rödel the other three by Galland. The Hurricanes were probably from No. 87 Squadron RAF. Stab./JG 27 had 101 Bf 109s on strength on 10 May and it flew 17 missions involving 325 sorties. RAF resistance on the first day cost the Luftwaffe 10 Junkers Ju 87s that were under the protection of JG 27 and I./Jagdgeschwader 51. The opposition weakened by 13 May and three weeks passed before Rödel claimed again.

Rödel was promoted to Oberleutnant (first lieutenant) on 1 June 1940. Stab./JG 27 took part in the Battle of Dunkirk on 2 June and were peripherally involved in Operation Paula on 3 June. Rödel claimed a Supermarine Spitfire on 2 June. On 7 June, he claimed his fourth victory and his last in France over a Potez 630 near Dunkirk.

=== Battle of Britain ===
JG 27 transferred to the Netherlands, Belgium and France in the aftermath of the French capitulation on 25 June 1940. The Luftwaffe began its air offensive against the United Kingdom in support of a planned invasion codenamed Operation Sea Lion. The air offensive became known as the Battle of Britain. In July 1940 Rödel was transferred to 4. Staffel (4th squadron) of JG 27 for the Kanalkampf phase of the battle. Röddel was appointed Staffelkapitän (Squadron Leader) of 4. Staffel on 6 September 1940. He replaced Oberleutnant Hermann Hollweg who took over 2. Staffel of Jagdgeschwader 2.

On 11 August JG 27 formed part of large-scale fighter sweeps over England as Albert Kesselring, commander-in-chief Luftflotte 2 (Air Fleet 2) sought to draw up No. 12 Group RAF under Air Officer Commanding Keith Park. The German fighter wings were despatched far in front of the bomber formations this day, in a bid to catch British fighters at a disadvantage and before they reached the bombers. In a rare tactical mistake, RAF Fighter Command intercepted what it perceived to be an in-coming bomber formation in the early morning attack. Rödel arrived over Weymouth Bay with JG 27 to cover the withdrawal of Messerschmitt Bf 110s from Zerstörergeschwader 2. A large dogfight began at 10:40 GMT as Rödel's unit fought a withdrawal across the English Channel. He claimed a "Spitfire" shot down. All three JG 27 Gruppen were involved and were known to have taken three losses in total in combat with 152, 238 and 145 squadrons. In return 238 lost five Hawker Hurricanes and four pilots killed in action with Bf 109s. 145 lost three Hurricanes and one pilot and 152 sustained no loss. On 30 August, Rödel claimed another Spitfire. At 11:45 JG 27 became embroiled in battle with Spitfires from 616 and Hurricanes from 253 Squadrons. JG 27 lost five Bf 109s and four pilots were missing in action. 253 Squadron lost three Hurricanes and two pilots killed and 616 lost two Spitfires—Flying Officer J. S. Bell was killed and Sergeant J. Hopewell survived a force-landing. The losses were reported over Redhill, the area recorded in Rödel's claim.

On 1 September Rödel claimed two Spitfires over Ashford and Folkestone. Fighter Command lost 15 destroyed and four damaged in combat with five killed and seven wounded. For the second and last time in the campaign, the Luftwaffe suffered the loss of fewer aircraft: five fighters destroyed and two damaged; two bombers destroyed and six damaged. Only Hurricane squadrons reported losses in the afternoon battle at the time of Rödel's claim: 1 Squadron (two destroyed one damaged), 79 (three destroyed), 72 (three destroyed), 85 (five destroyed one damaged) and 253 Squadron (one destroyed). Rödel was appointed Staffelkapitän of 4./JG 27 on this date.

On 3 September, Rödel claimed a Hurricane and Spitfire over Southend. JG 27 were involved in combat with Spitfires from No. 603 Squadron RAF and lost one pilot wounded. The only British losses sustained were by Hurricane squadrons. No. 46 Squadron RAF lost three Hurricanes over Southend at the time of Rödel's claims—Sergeant G. H. Edgworthy, Pilot Officer H. Morgan-Gray and Sergeant E. Bloor were shot down by Bf 109s. Edgworthy was killed. 13 Hurricanes were lost and five damaged in the air battle. Six are recorded as lost to Bf 110s four were lost or damaged in accidents and another by friendly-fire. Rödel was credited with another Spitfire on 6 September. JG 27 lost five Bf 109s and one damaged. Four were missing and two wounded. Gruppenkommandeur Schlichting of III./JG 27 was among the missing. 43 and 303 Squadron are known to have been their opponents. 303 lost two Hurricanes and a further two were damaged by Bf 109s. Two pilots were severely wounded including Squadron leader Zdzisław Krasnodębski. 43 Squadron suffered no loss. On 11 September Rödel claimed another victory over Tunbridge Wells.

On 27 September Rödel claimed two Hurricanes. One was claimed at 12:05 GMT. In this battle JG 27 lost three Bf 109s to Spitfires from 19 Squadron and 222 Squadron. 222 Squadron lost one Spitfire and had one pilot severely wounded and 19 Squadron lost two Spitfires and had one pilot wounded and one pilot killed. In the large air battle, 41 (three destroyed, one wounded), 46 (one damaged), 152 (five damaged), 242 (one destroyed and missing), 501 (two destroyed, one dead one wounded), 504 (one destroyed), 602 (one destroyed), 603 (one destroyed one dead) and 616 Squadrons (one destroyed one died of wounds) lost aircraft between 12:05 and 12:30. At least nine German Geschwader were involved in the battle. The Luftwaffe lost 51 aircraft and 15 damaged to Fighter Command's 28 destroyed and 13 damaged. Rödel probably shot down Squadron leader C. Haw, commanding, No. 504 Squadron RAF. Haw force-landed Hurricane P3415 uninjured. On 5 November, II. Gruppe was withdrawn from combat operations on the English Channel, relocating to Detmold on 9 November.

=== Battle of Greece and Eastern Front ===
While based at Detmold, the pilots were given a period of rest while the Gruppe received a few factory new Messerschmitt Bf 109 E-7 aircraft. On 2 January 1941, II. Gruppe received orders to relocate to Romania. On 10 January, the air elements flew to Wien-Schwechat airfield where they stayed two weeks. On 10 February, the Gruppe relocated to Bucharest-Băneasa airfield. After the Bulgaria joined the Axis powers on 1 March, II. Gruppe was ordered to relocate to an airfield named Sofia-Vrba located approximately halfway between Radomir and Sofia to augment the VIII. Fliegerkorps commanded by Generaloberst Wolfram Freiherr von Richthofen. This relocation was already made in preparation for Operation Marita, the German invasion of Greece and Yugoslavia launched on 6 April. On 6 April 1941, after the failed Italian invasion, it was deployed in the German-led invasion of Greece. On 15 April Rödel led his Staffel to Kalambaka and Vasiliki. Captain George Mokkas, commanding 23 Mira engaged them but was shot down and killed by Rödel who mistook his Bloch MB.150 for a Hurricane. It was his 15th victory. Minutes later Rödel claimed two Gloster Gladiators and another three claims were made for Gladiators by his Staffel. The Greek fighters were actually PZL P.24s. Captain Kellas of 21 Mira, Katsarellas of 22 Mira and First Lieutenant Kontogiorgos were wounded. On 20 April 1941 Rödel claimed three Hurricanes from No. 80 Squadron RAF in ten minutes.

In preparation for Operation Barbarossa, the German invasion of the Soviet Union, II. Gruppe was moved to a makeshift airfield name Praszniki, located northeast of Suwałki close to the Curzon Line, on 18 June. On 25 June 1941 Rödel claimed his only victory in this theatre over Vilnius. The claim was recorded as a Tupolev SB. On 1 July, II. Gruppe was withdrawn from combat operations, all serviceable aircraft were transferred to III. Gruppe of JG 27 and the personnel was ordered to return to Suwałki, awaiting further orders.

=== North Africa ===
Following the withdrawal from the Eastern Front, II. Gruppe arrived at Döberitz, located approximately 10 kilometers (6.2 miles) west of Staaken, on 24 July. Here, the Gruppe was equipped with the Bf 109 F-4 and prepared for combat in North Africa to support a German contingent, the Deutsche Afrika Korps under the command of Erwin Rommel. On 16 September, 4. Staffel under command of Rödel began the relocation, arriving at Ayn al-Ġazāla on 22 September. On 3 October, Rödel claimed a Desert Air Force Curtiss P-40 Warhawk of No. 112 Squadron RAF shot down. The pilot may have been Sergeant Stirrat. On 10 October he claimed a pair of P-40s. One of the claims may have been from 2 Squadron SAAF which lost two P-40s. Rödel claimed his 25th and 26th victory over a Bristol Blenheim near Gazala, perhaps belonging to No. 11 Squadron RAF, and a P-40 near Bir Hacheim. The British Eighth Army began Operation Crusader on 18 November and a week later, on 25 November, Rödel claimed a Hurricane and P-40 in a large air battle over Tobruk. As the German and Italian armies laid siege to the city. Rödel claimed single victories on 1st, 4th, 5 and 6 December—a Hurricane, two P-40s and a Bristol Beaufighter. The 4 December victory was the P-40 flown by Second Lieutenant Meek of 2 Squadron SAAF over Al Adm. The 6 December claim was probably a No. 274 Squadron RAF Beaufighter flown by Pilot Officer William G. Snow which crashed near Tobruk. Snow and his navigator Sergeant John K. Dutton were captured.

On a mission in January 1942 Rödel was accidentally rammed by Unteroffizier Heidel and was forced to carry out a force-landing. On 27 March 1942 1. and 4. Staffel formed 10 Bf 109s to escort 15 Ju 87s from I.Sturzkampfgeschwader 3. P-40s from 2 SAAF and 80 Squadron RAF were scrambled to intercept. Ludwig Franzisket from 1. Staffel claimed a victory and Rödel claimed two of the three by his own unit. From 2 SAAF Lieutenants Lipawski and E. Smith were shot down and survived crash-landings—the former's aircraft was strafed and burnt out on the ground. Lieutenant Bryant's P-40 was also damaged, lightly. Flight Sergeant Comfort from 80 Squadron was also hit and his Hurricane badly damaged.

On 6 April Rödel claimed one of the four claims made by JG 27. Gerhard Homuth was among the other claimants. Desert Air Force records show that No. 94 Squadron RAF and Flight Lieutenant D. F. O. Shelford was killed. 2 and 40 Squadron SAAF lost one P-40 and a Hurricane respectively—Lieutenants R. D. B. Morton and Egner survived. The next day II./JG 27 engaged 94 Sqn, 260 Sqn, 450 Sqn RAAF and 4 Squadron SAAF. 450 Sqn lost one in combat. 260 Sqn lost one P-40 and another badly damaged and one of 4 Sqn SAAF's P-40s was damaged. Rödel shot down the 260 Squadron P-40 piloted by Flying Officer E. T. Thompson. Willy Kientsch appears to have fired at and claimed the same aircraft but both were credited with victories while JG 27 claimed four victories. On 7 April, 4. Staffel intercepted 40 Squadron SAAF and Rödel made the only claim—although three P-40s were brought down. Lieutenants Gouws, J. P. Blaauw and D. N. Stott all survived. The claim was Rödel's 38th victory. On 25 April JG 27 fought a large air battle over Gazala. The Germans claimed 10. 2, 4 SAAF and 260 Squadron RAF lost 8 destroyed between then and another 5 damaged. Rödel claimed one, while Günter Steinhausen claimed one and Hans-Joachim Marseille claimed two. JG 27 lost four Bf 109s in aerial combat.

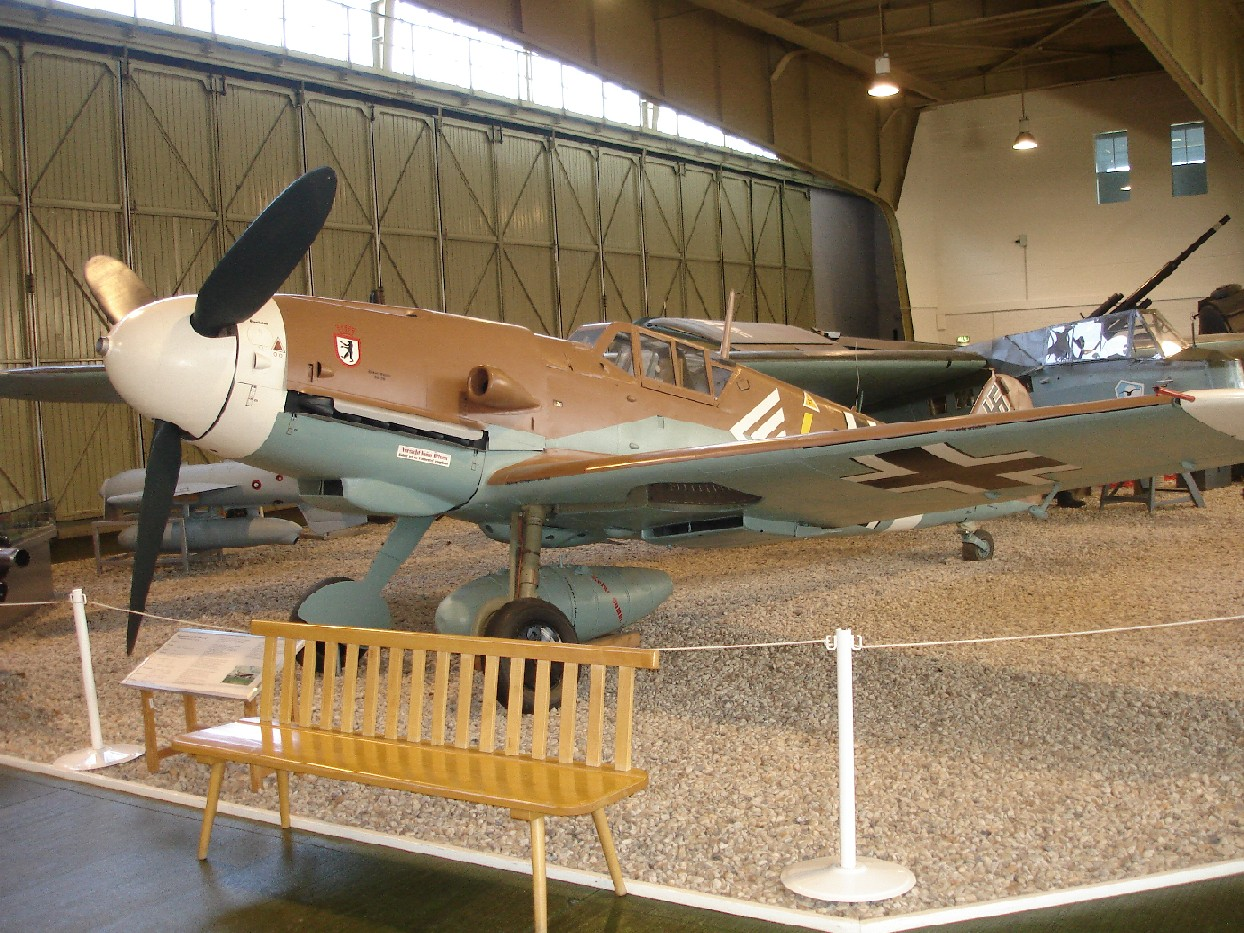
Rödel's Bf 109 G-2 remake in the Militärhistorisches Museum Flugplatz Berlin-Gatow.

Rödel was promoted to Hauptmann (captain) on 1 May 1942. On 20 May 1942, Rödel was appointed Gruppenkommandeur (Group Commander) of II./JG 27, replacing Major Erich Gerlitz who took over III. Gruppe of Jagdgeschwader 53. In the last week of May the desert fighting escalated in the Battle of Gazala and Battle of Bir Hakeim. On 23 May Rödel led the formation in an attack on 33 Squadron Hurricanes. He shot down its leader Flight Lieutenant P. D. Wade (not to be confused Lance Wade in the same squadron). Wade survived the ditching into the sea but died, presumably of drowning or wounds. Rödel's combat report stated that he observed the enemy pilot swimming away from his sinking fighter. Rödel claimed one other victory that day. 5. Staffel lost one Bf 109 with a wounded pilot and Lehrgeschwader 1 lost one Junkers Ju 88 in air combat and two on the ground. Italian units suffered no losses. Four Hurricanes were lost and two badly damaged. Two Martin Baltimore bombers were destroyed and two badly damaged. Two pilots from 33 and another two from 80 Squadron were killed as well as six men from the Boston-equipped No. 233 Squadron RAF. Marseille and Homuth claimed the bombers—two by the former and one by the latter. Rödel now had 41.

Over Bir Hacheim on 4 June, I./JG 27 escorted Ju 87s from I./StG 3 over the front. 2 SAAF, 3 Squadron SAAF and 5 Squadron SAAF led by Major John Frost. The P-40s attacked and claimed eight of the Ju 87s before the Bf 109s could act. Rödel's Gruppe arrived as the last Ju 87s were going down and attacked the South Africans. 4 SAAF lost three P-40s and two pilots captured. The third, Lieutenant Lane was picked up by Pilot Officer George Keefer who had been seconded from 274 Squadron. Lieutenant Horne, seconded from 260 Squadron, also picked up Major Meaker from 5 SAAF when hit by a Ju 87 gunner. Rödel made one of only two claims by JG 27 in the fight. The Italian Macchi C.202-equipped 10 Gruppo claimed 13 destroyed and two damaged in the day's fighting. Rödel claimed one P-40 destroyed.

The First Battle of El Alamein began on 1 July. Rödel had his most successful day in Africa, claiming three shot down on 10 July. The three P-40s raised his total to 45. Rödel accounted for his 46th and 47th victories on 19 July. The identity of the Allied formation was probably 238 Squadron. Two days later Rödel claimed four Hurricanes from seven submitted by German pilots in combat over the El Alamein area. They were probably from 238 Squadron. July was particularly successful for Rödel and Homuth's pilots.

On 31 August he claimed a solitary victory as the Battle of Alam el Halfa began. The 1 September 1942 is remembered for Marseille's 17 claims, but for the Axis ground forces it was not such a success, their armour failing to gain success. Six Kittyhawks of 450 Squadron RAAF provided top cover to 18 Boston bombers at 07:38. Rödel led four Bf 109s shooting down one of the three claimed by his flight. On 5 September he claimed a triple victory. Rödel repeated this feat on 9 October, after 70 P-40s of 112 Sqn RAF, 250 Sqn RAF, 450 Sqn RAAF, 3 Sqn RAAF, 2 Sqn SAAF, 4 Sqn SAAF and 5 Sqn SAAF, with support from the US 66th Fighter Squadron, attacked German and Italian airfields: directly over their own airfield, the pilots of six Bf 109s of II. Gruppe fought elements of this large Allied formation. Approximately 70 P-40s of 112, 250, 450, 3 RAAF, 2, 4 and 5 Squadrons with support from the US 66th Fighter Squadron were ordered to attack German and Italian airfields and his opponents came from these groups. On 22 October Rödel claimed a B-25 Mitchell from the US 12th Bombardment Group. The bomber was hit by anti-aircraft artillery, fell out of formation and was then shot down by Rödel. it was the 12th Group's only loss.

On the night of the 23 October 1942 the British began the Second battle of El Alamein. The following morning JG 27 flew an all-out operation to support German and Italian forces. Rödel led II./JG 27 and they met 18 bombers and 30 P-40s. Rödel claimed three of the latter between 11:43 and 11:50. On the morning of the 26 October German and Italian forces counter-attacked Outpost Snipe and the Desert Air Force supported the defence of the position by attacking Axis armour. Rödel and eight other Bf 109s from his Gruppe took off on a frei jagd (free hunt—or combat air patrol in modern parlance). They engaged a large formation of P-40s and Rödel probably shot down the P-40 flown by Sergeant Rattle from 260 Squadron. Rödel claimed another trio of RAF fighters on 27 October—a P-39 Airacobra, P-40 and Spitfire. The Spitfire fell at 10:23 and a Curtiss at 10:42. Rödel's fought to cover the 15th and 21st Panzer Division in another assault on Outpost Snipe. Rödel claimed two more just before 11:00 on 31 October as JG 27 sought to provide determined German-Italian counter-attacks with air support. The following morning Rödel filed his last claim for a victory over Egypt. At approximately 07:00 he claimed a Spitfire south of Sidi Abdel Rahman.

=== Air War over Italy and Greece ===
II./JG 27 avoided the defeat at El Alamein which began with the British breakthrough on 4 November. The Anglo-American Operation Torch, four days later, caught the Axis armies in a vice which eventually destroyed them in the Tunisian Campaign which brought the war in North Africa to an end on 13 May 1943. Along with the Stabsstaffel (headquarters unit), II. Gruppe withdrew to Germany for resting. In February 1943 it began staging down the leg of Italy to Sicily. Eduard Neumann oversaw the transfer while still flying the ageing Bf 109F-4/Trops. The fighter group was based at San Pietro, 20 miles (32 kilometres) inland from the island's southern coast. Rödel supervised an influx of new pilots and re-equipment with Bf 109G-4s and Bf 109G-6 models to replace the depleted Staffeln. Once at established strength it moved some Staffeln to Trapani and operated from there. The main task of the fighter group was to escort Axis convoys from Italy to Tunisia. The air and sea threat from British forces based on Malta was now severe. The island was no longer under siege and its forces had taken the offensive.

Rödel's command was not successful. On 18 April 1943 less than a dozen of the group's Bf 109s formed an escort for 65 Junkers Ju 52 transports flying to Tunisia. With the Allied Operation Flax now in effect, the mission ended with an attack of up to a large number of Allied fighters which shot down 24 of the transports. The German unit claimed only a single Spitfire and the battle became known as the Palm Sunday Massacre. Four days later, on 22 April, the group could not stop the destruction of 14 Messerschmitt Me 321s. The German pilots reported up to 80 Allied fighters and could only claim three of their assailants. The very same day Neumann left JG 27 for a staff appointment with the staff of Galland's General der Jagdflieger. Rödel replaced him as Geschwaderkommodore (Wing Commander) of JG 27. II. Rödel appointed Werner Schröer to command II. Gruppe.

Rödel was a firm believer in leading in the air in contrast to the fighter wing's previous commanders. All five of the victories claimed by the Stab unit in the first two months over Sicily were credited to him. In May 1943 the Mediterranean Air Command (MAC) under the command of Arthur Tedder ordered heavy air attacks against Axis airfields in Sicily. II./JG 27 claimed 20 heavy bombers and a similar number of P-38 Lightnings but the raids caused heavy damage. From 18 to 22 May Rödel claimed two B-17 Flying Fortress heavy bombers and three P-38s. From 18 to 31 May 1943 the JG 27-contingent claimed 25 Allied aircraft destroyed. On 20 June, II./JG 27 was redeployed to Lecce on the Italian mainland. That day, Rödel was awarded the Knight's Cross of the Iron Cross with Oak Leaves (Ritterkreuz des Eisernen Kreuzes mit Eichenlaub) for 78 aerial victories claimed. He was the 255th member of the German armed forces to be so honored. The presentation was made by Hitler at the Wolf's Lair, Hitler's headquarters in Rastenburg in July 1943. From Lecce, ten days before Operation Husky and the invasion of Sicily, the group claimed six out of 24-strong formation of Consolidated B-24 Liberator bombers—a rare success.

Rödel's Geschwaderstab moved to Kalamaki in occupied Greece. Here, Rödel assumed direct control of III. Gruppe and the newly formed IV. Gruppe. The remaining II. and I. Gruppen remained far-flung across the Mediterranean. III. Gruppe had been based at Kastelli on Crete for the preceding four months. Rödel was ordered to defend the air space above the Aegean Sea. On 2 July 1943, Rödel claimed a Bristol Beaufighter shot down for his 79th victory near Milos. On 8 September 1943 an Allied force landed in the Dodecanese. JG 27 contested the invasion against incursions by the US Twelfth Air Force over Greek airspace. Rödel claimed a B-24 on 4 October and a P-38 and B-25 Mitchell on 8 October to bring his tally to 83. The only other pilot to claim a victory in the Stab unit was Jost Schlang—one time wingman of Hans Joachim Marseille—who claimed a B-17 on 10 October west of Corinth.

=== Defence of the Reich ===
By 9 February 1944 JG 27 had all but abandoned Greece to return to the Reich for the Defence of the Reich duty. Only 7. Staffel was permitted to remain and claimed the last victories on 14 May 1944. I. Gruppe was based at Fels am Wagram, west of Vienna on 12 August 1943 for the next ten months. II./JG 27 remained in central Germany until June 1944 when it was withdrawn to rest and re-equip at Fels am Wagram. In the final weeks it was joined by III. and IV. Gruppen. Rödel's Stab unit arrived in February 1944. The Kommodore continued to lead from the front and claimed 11 of the 25 victories claimed by the command squadron in the last few weeks of operations over Hungary, Austria and southern Germany. On 13 May the command Staffel moved to Wien-Seyring near Vienna.

On 19 March 1944 Rödel flew his first RLV operation. The US Fifteenth Air Force sent a small formation of bombers to southern Germany. En route to Austria one Italian and two groups of German fighters from Jafü Oberitalien (Fighter Leader Northern Italy) in northern Italy and then Jagdfliegerführer Ostmark (Jafü Ostmark—Fighter Leader Austria) attacked. Rödel led III. and IV. into battle with 87 Bf 109s against of formation of 92 B-24s, which formed part of the USAAF operation. The battle cost Rödel ten Bf 109s and six pilots. The Germans claimed 27 B-24s and were credited with 21. American losses amounted to six B-17s and 12 B-24s for a total of 18. Eight came from the 454th Bombardment Group. Rödel claimed two B-17s. III. Gruppe claimed 12 B-24s for two losses.

On 2 April the Fifteenth bombed a ball-bearing and aircraft factory near Steyr. Rödel claimed a P-47 Thunderbolt. 11 B-17s and 31 B-24s were claimed but not confirmed—actual American losses were eight and 20. Only one claim for a P-47 was made—by Rödel—but it appears all returned. The following day JG 27 scrambled to intercept large formations of Fifteenth bombers targeting Budapest. Other fighter units of the 7 Jagddivision could only reach the target area if given amply warning and Rödel's Geschwader were the only German fighters to make contact. Three Gruppen attacked. Royal Hungarian Air Force Bf 109s also joined the interception with Bf 109Gs and Messerschmitt Me 210s. JG 27 claimed four B-17s, one B-24 and one P-38 for no loss. Hungarian pilots claimed an identical number of B-17s and B-24s but no P-38s for one pilot killed. The Fifteenth confirmed lost four B-17s and one B-24 half the total amount Axis pilots claimed. It claimed four Me 210s and three Bf 109s which are not corroborated. Another source gives a loss of nine bombers and one loss for III. Gruppe. Rödel claimed one of the B-17s in the action.

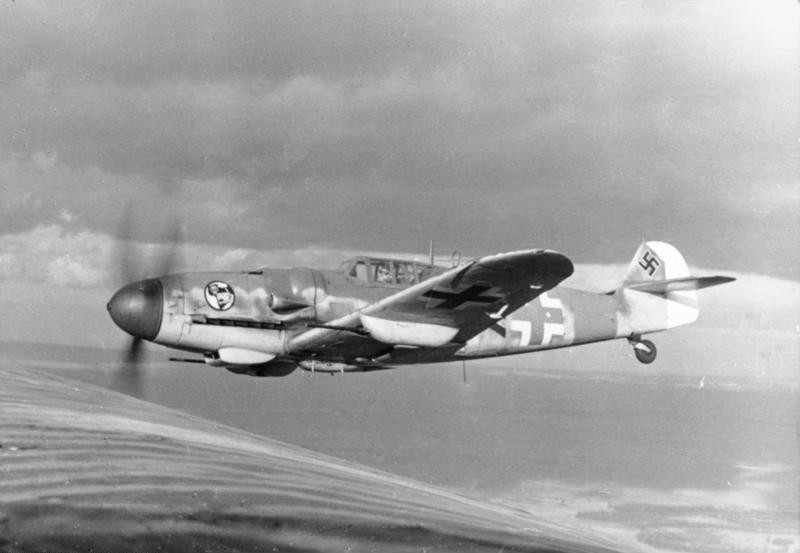
Messerschmitt Bf 109 G-6 of Jagdgeschwader 27 with two MG 151/20 gun pods under the wings. This aircraft was flown by Gruppenkommandeur Major Ludwig Franzisket in early 1944.

On 12 April the Eighth Air Force targeted Schweinfurt and the Fifteenth attacked targets around Vienna. The Eighth operation was suspended because of weather but fighter forces continued a sweep over Germany. I. Jagdkorps units claimed to have fought off the attacks. In the south, the Fifteenth continued. Jagddivision 7 committed 190 fighters to battle and lost 21 in dogfights with the USAAF escorts. American losses amounted to just seven bombers: fighter losses are not known. Rödel claimed one of the seven B-17s. The next day the Fifteenth targeted Schweinfurt and Oberpfaffenhofen, two targets hated by American bomber crews. III./Jagdgeschwader 3 two JG 27 Gruppen of Jafü Ostmark and all of Jagdabschnitt Ungarn (Fighter Section Hungary)—III./JG 27 and five Hungarian Bf 109 and Me 210 night fighter units—were scrambled to intercept. 18 American bombers were lost. The Me 210s lost 13 to the American escorts.

On 12 May the Eighth Air Force struck at the petroleum industry near Bruz. 886 heavy bombers and 876 fighters began the operation. Luftflotte Reich committed 475 fighters in 22 fighter groups to intercept. II./JG 27 was able to get airborne and with II./JG 53 and were ordered to rendezvous with Jagdgeschwader 1 but came under attack from P-51 Mustangs. The Bf 109s were able to break free they intercepted the bomber stream over the Tannus Mountains, near Frankfurt. Both groups reported successes but lost 11 Bf 109s. I. Grupppe claimed seven (plus two P-51s), III., claimed 13, IV., five, while Stab JG 27 claimed three bombers. Rödel led I. and III. personally but could not prevent his force losing 14 Bf 109s, three killed and seven wounded. The 3rd US Bomb Division alone lost 41 bombers—possibly to attacks from JG 3 and 11—before the escorts intervened. Rödel claimed another pair of heavy bombers. Seven days later he repeated the feat.

On 28 May 1944 the Eighth returned to bomb oil targets in central Germany. 1,341 bombers from several bomb divisions participated. Rödel led JG 27 without filing a claim. During the course of the mission the Bf 109s chanced upon and unescorted bombers from the 94th Bombardment Wing. A combat box of 50 B-17s were flying to Dessau and nearing Magdeburg. Rödel's Geschwader did not normally employ a set formation to attack US heavy bombers but they took advantage of the situation and attacked in Staffeln-strength. IV. Gruppe was flying as escort to engaged US fighters but came down to join the attack. The P-51s were urgently requested by the lead B-17 but were occupied by other German fighter units. Rödel's men attacked and forced the American formation—in a rare instance of indiscipline—to jettison their bombs to gain speed and escape.

Smoke and haze obscured Dessau and the Americans set course for Leipzig, the secondary target but only six B-17s dropped their bombs. When the 94th returned to England they had lost 15 bombers. JG 27 claimed 16 and one P-51 for four killed and two wounded and seven Bf 109s. The Eighth Air Force lost 32 bombers and 14 fighters. I. Jagdkorps lost 18 killed, 13 wounded and 52 fighters. The official victories granted to Rödel's command were Herausschüsse ("shooting-out"—damaging a bomber so severely it drops out of formation and because an easy target for final destruction). JG 27 would never achieve that level of success again and for the remainder of the war rarely claimed a total in double-figures. The following day Rödel scored his last successes in Defence of the Reich operation—one heavy bomber.

=== Western Front ===
On 6 June 1944 Operation Overlord and the D-Day landings began. Rödel was ordered to relocate to France immediately and he arrived at Champfleury, 60 miles (95 km) southeast of Paris late on 6 June. I., III., and IV. Gruppen were now pitted against the weight of Anglo-American air power. In the battles that followed the units sustained 130 casualties, roughly two-thirds of them killed in action as the Germans retreated from France and across Belgium. The Geschwader claimed slightly more victories than losses but could not replace their men and machines as opposed to their enemy. Reichsmarschall Hermann Göring tried to address the loss of experienced pilots by ordering the Geschwaderkommodore not to fly unless the size of the formation he was leading surpassed 45. It likely cost Rödel the chance to pass the 100-mark but also improved his chances of survival.

Rödel claimed four victories over Normandy. On 29 June 1944, in the middle of Operation Epsom and Martlet, Rödel led his command flight into battle over Évreux against P-47 fighter-bombers. On 5 July 1944 he claimed a P-38 for his 98th and final air victory. This was also the last of the 82 claims submitted by the Geschwaderstab in World War II. Rödel accounted for 28 of these 82 enemy aircraft.

Rödel's pilots were now fighting a different war at lower-level with Allied fighters and fighter bombers. On 12 June Gruppenkommandeur Otto Meyer led IV. Gruppe claimed nine P-47s west of Évreux with Meyer claiming three, at a cost of one killed and five wounded. On 14 June Heinrich Bartels, who was an established fighter leader four as the unit claimed eight P-47s and a pair of B-17s without loss. It was not long before experienced pilots were lost. Meyer was killed over Caen on 12 July. Within two weeks of Meyer's loss his command had been reduced to nine Bf 109s and was withdrawn in mid-August. In mid-July III. Gruppe was withdrawn. On 1 August, Rödel was promoted to Oberst (colonel) making him the youngest living Oberst of the Wehrmacht at the time.

The four Gruppen were officially set for re-equipment and re-training on 15 August 1944. The Geschwader began receiving the Bf 109G-14 and Bf 109K-4 over the early autumn. Each Staffel received 15 aircraft and each Gruppe had an established strength of 60 fighters. By mid-autumn it had 250 fighters and was the largest fighter unit at the time and any time in the history of JG 27. The Oil campaign had contributed to a lack of training and most pilots lacked operational and combat experience. The war situation had brought the Western Allies to the German border by this time. The situation meant that the Defence of the Reich and close air support on the frontline were practically one and the same mission.

On 2 November 1944 Rödel's command suffered its worst loss of the war. Around 600 Eighth Air Force bombers attacked Merseburg-Leuna. JG 27 could not penetrate the bomber stream but claimed six P-51s battling escorting US fighter groups. In return it lost 50 Bf 109s with 27 pilots killed and 12 wounded. By mid-December another 39 pilots were dead and 14 had suffered wounds. On 16 December 1944 JG 27 participated in the Ardennes offensive but Rödel flew intermittently. On 23 December the 94th Bomb Group B-17 Darling Dott, formerly Big Gas Bird, became the last of 550 heavy bombers to fall to his command. This same day the unit suffered a blow when Bartels was killed in action with US P-47s. JG 27 was in constant action over Belgium from 16 to 29 December 1944 and suffered significant losses.

Rödel was also concerned at the level of morale in JG 27. British intelligence decrypted an Ultra message which suggested he suspected nearly 20 percent of pilots broke off their attacks on American bombers without good reason and jettisoned their drop tanks and returned to base prematurely. Rödel issued an order that any pilot who did so again would be court-martialled. Rödel also ordered that, "even in the event of such Allied air activity, a proportion of the fighters must avoid air combat and penetrate without fail into the area above the foremost panzer spearheads" in order to provide air cover for land forces that had begun to diminish. He had no time to carry out the threat. On 29 December 1944 he was relieved of his command. Long-term member Major Ludwig Franzisket replaced him.

=== Staff command and end of war ===
Rödel was informed of a planned air offensive against Allied airfields prior to his departure. This operation was scheduled for mid-December but did not take place until New Year's Day 1945. Christened Operation Bodenplatte, it was a disaster for JG 27. The German wing struck at Melsbroek Air Base. The pilots of JG 27 and 54 claimed 85 victories and 40 damaged. German reconnaissance was able to "confirm" 49. JG 27 suffered unacceptable losses; 17 Bf 109s, 11 pilots killed, one wounded and three captured.

On 1 January 1945, Rödel was appointed commander 2. Jagd-Division (2nd Fighter Division) based in Stade. In this role, he also attended the meeting with Reichsmarschall Hermann Göring in what became known as the "Fighter Pilots Revolt". The meeting took place on 22 January. In April 1945, his oldest son Rüdiger, still in his infancy, was killed in an RAF raid.

== Later life ==
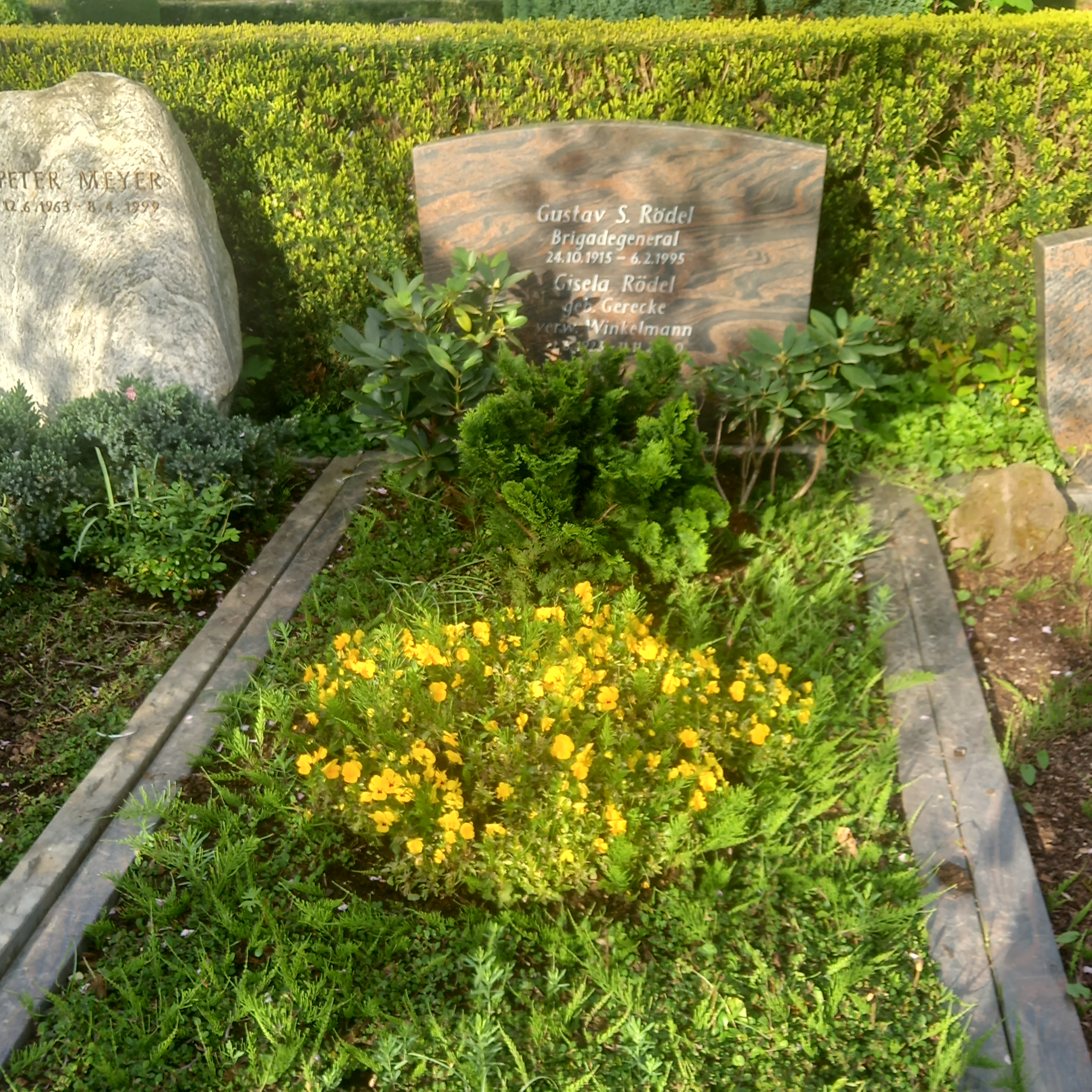
Graves of Gisela and Gustav Rödel in Bad Godesberg.

On 16 March 1957, Rödel reentered military service in the West German Air Force. Following various training courses in the United States, in 1958, he was assigned to the Air Defense Division at NATO's Supreme Headquarters Allied Powers Europe (SHAPE) in Paris. His last service position was Sector Commander with the Second Allied Tactical Air Force (2 ATAF). On 30 September 1971, Rödel retired from military service. His final rank was Brigadegeneral (brigadier general). Rödel died on 6 February 1995 in Bonn-Bad Godesberg and was buried at the Cemetery Rüngsdorf (Section II–Grave 708).

== Summary of career ==
=== Aerial victory claims ===
According to US historian David T. Zabecki, Rödel was credited with 98 aerial victories. Obermaier also lists him with 98 enemy aircraft shot down in 980 combat missions, of which one was claimed in the invasion of Poland, one on the Eastern Front and 52 in the Mediterranean theatre. His 98 aerial victories includes 13 four-engined bombers. Mathews and Foreman, authors of Luftwaffe Aces: Biographies and Victory Claims, researched the German Federal Archives and found records for 95 aerial victory claims, plus seven further unconfirmed claims. All but one aerial victory claimed on the Eastern Front were claimed on the Western Front and include eleven four-engined bombers.

Victory claims were logged to a map-reference (PQ = Planquadrat), for example "PQ 15 Ost S/GC-8". The Luftwaffe grid map (Jägermeldenetz) covered all of Europe, western Russia and North Africa and was composed of rectangles measuring 15 minutes of latitude by 30 minutes of longitude, an area of about 360 square miles (930 km^{2}). These sectors were then subdivided into 36 smaller units to give a location area 3 km × 4 km (1.9 mi × 2.5 mi) in size.

Chronicle of aerial victories
This and the – (dash) indicates unwitnessed aerial victory claims for which Rödel did not receive credit. This along with the * (asterisk) indicates an Herausschuss (separation shot)—a severely damaged heavy bomber forced to separate from his combat box which was counted as an aerial victory. This and the ? (question mark) indicates information discrepancies listed by Prien, Stemmer, Rodeike, Bock, Mathews and Foreman.
| Claim | Date | Time | Type | Location | Unit | Claim | Date | Time | Type | Location | Unit |
– Claims with I. Gruppe of Jagdgeschwader 21 – Invasion of Poland
| 1 | 1 September 1939 | 17:08 | PZL P.24 (P.7a or P.11c) | vicinity of Warsaw | 2./JG 21 | | | | | | |
– Claims with Stab of Jagdgeschwader 27 – Battle of France — 10 May – 25 June 1940
| 2 | 12 May 1940 | 10:15 | Hurricane | Huy; 15 km (9.3 mi) south of Liège | Stab/JG 27 | 4 | 7 June 1940 | 10:50 | Potez 63 | northwest of Dunkirk | Stab/JG 27 |
| 3 | 2 June 1940 | 09:14 | Spitfire | west of Dunkirk | Stab/JG 27 | | | | | | |
– Claims with II. Gruppe of Jagdgeschwader 27 – On the Channel Front — August – November 1940
| 5 | 11 August 1940 | 10:40 | Spitfire | north of Cape de la Hague | 4./JG 27 | — | 6 September 1940 | — | Spitfire | | 4./JG 27 |
| 6 | 30 August 1940 | 12:28 | Spitfire | north of Redhill | 4./JG 27 | — | 6 September 1940 | — | Spitfire | | 4./JG 27 |
| 7 | 1 September 1940 | 15:05 | Spitfire | Ashford; Southend | 4./JG 27 | 12 | 11 September 1940 | 16:32 | Spitfire | Elham | 4./JG 27 |
| 8 | 1 September 1940 | 15:30 | Spitfire | Folkestone | 4./JG 27 | 13 | 27 September 1940 | 13:05 | Hurricane | Milton Regis | 4./JG 27 |
| 9 | 3 September 1940 | 11:20 | Spitfire | Southend | 4./JG 27 | 14 | 27 September 1940 | 16:18 | Hurricane | east of London | 4./JG 27 |
| 10 | 3 September 1940 | 11:50 | Hurricane | Southend | 4./JG 27 | — | 13 October 1940 | — | Spitfire | | 4./JG 27 |
| 11 | 6 September 1940 | 10:05 | Spitfire | Tunbridge Wells | 4./JG 27 | | | | | | |
– Claims with II. Gruppe of Jagdgeschwader 27 – During the Balkan Campaign — April 1940
| 15 | 15 April 1941 | 06:50 | Hurricane | west of Trikkala | 4./JG 27 | 18 | 20 April 1941 | 16:57 | Hurricane | Megara | 4./JG 27 |
| 16 | 15 April 1941 | 06:55 | PZL P.24? (Note: According to Mathews and Foreman claimed as a Gloster Gladiator.) | west of Trikkala | 4./JG 27 | 19 | 20 April 1941 | 17:01 | Hurricane | Migalo | 4./JG 27 |
| 17 | 15 April 1941 | 07:05 | PZL P.24 | 10 km (6.2 mi) northeast of Trikkala | 4./JG 27 | 20 | 20 April 1941 | 17:08 | Hurricane | Migalo | 4./JG 27 |
– Claims with II. Gruppe of Jagdgeschwader 27 – On the Eastern Front — June 1941
| 21 | 25 June 1941 | 16:40 | SB-3 | Vilnius | 4./JG 27 | | | | | | |
– Claims with II. Gruppe of Jagdgeschwader 27 – In North Africa — April 1941 – December 1942
| 22 | 3 October 1941 | 15:55 | Hurricane | southwest of Sidi Barrani | 4./JG 27 | 48 | 21 July 1942 | 18:10 | Hurricane | south-southwest of El Alamein | Stab II./JG 27 |
| 23 | 6 October 1941 | 09:10 | P-40 | southeast of Sidi Omar | 4./JG 27 | 49 | 21 July 1942 | 18:12 | Hurricane | south-southwest of El Alamein | Stab II./JG 27 |
| 24 | 6 October 1941 | 09:20 | Hurricane | southeast of Sidi Omar | 4./JG 27 | 50 | 21 July 1942 | 18:12 | Hurricane | northeast of El Dabaa | Stab II./JG 27 |
| 25 | 22 November 1941 | 14:05 | Blenheim | 80 km (50 mi) southeast of Ain el Gazala | 4./JG 27 | 51 | 21 July 1942 | 18:20 | Hurricane | 8 km (5.0 mi) southwest of El Alamein | Stab II./JG 27 |
| 26 | 22 November 1941 | 16:40 | P-40 | southeast of Bir Hacheim | 4./JG 27 | 52 | 31 August 1942 | 18:29 | Spitfire | south-southeast of El Alamein | Stab II./JG 27 |
| 27 | 25 November 1941 | 15:55 | Hurricane | north of Tobruk | 4./JG 27 | 53 | 1 September 1942 | 07:05 | P-40 | south of Sana Hut | Stab II./JG 27 |
| 28 | 25 November 1941 | 15:57 | P-40 | north of Tobruk | 4./JG 27 | 54 | 3 September 1942 | 10:20 | P-40 | Deir el Raghil | Stab II./JG 27 |
| 29 | 1 December 1941 | 12:40 | Hurricane | southwest of El Adem | 4./JG 27 | 55 | 5 September 1942 | 10:53 | P-40 | south-southwest of El Alamein | Stab II./JG 27 |
| 30 | 4 December 1941 | 10:18 | P-40 | northeast of Bir el Gubi | 4./JG 27 | 56 | 5 September 1942 | 10:57 | P-40 | south-southwest of El Alamein | Stab II./JG 27 |
| 31 | 5 December 1941 | 11:55 | P-40 | northwest of Bir el Gubi | 4./JG 27 | 57 | 5 September 1942 | 11:00 | P-40 | south-southwest of El Alamein | Stab II./JG 27 |
| 32 | 6 December 1941 | 11:55 | Beaufighter | Tobruk | 4./JG 27 | 58 | 9 October 1942 | 09:23 | P-39 | north of Turbiya | Stab II./JG 27 |
| 33 | 4 January 1942 | 08:40 | Hurricane | southeast of Ajdabiya | 4./JG 27 | 59 | 9 October 1942 | 09:27 | P-39 | north-northeast of El Dabaa | Stab II./JG 27 |
| 34 | 27 March 1942 | 17:10 | P-40 | west of Tobruk | 4./JG 27 | 60 | 9 October 1942 | 09:35 | Spitfire | northwest of Sanyet Quotaifiya | Stab II./JG 27 |
| 35 | 27 March 1942 | 17:24 | P-40 | southwest of Ain el Gazala | 4./JG 27 | 61 | 13 October 1942 | 09:39 | P-39 | south-southwest of El Alamein | Stab II./JG 27 |
| 36 | 6 April 1942 | 08:23 | P-40 | Timimi/Martuba | 4./JG 27 | 62 | 22 October 1942 | 10:45 | B-25 | southwest of El Alamein | Stab II./JG 27 |
| 37 | 7 April 1942 | 15:43 | P-40 | north of Mteifel Chebir | 4./JG 27 | 63 | 24 October 1942 | 09:43 | P-40 | southwest of El Alamein | Stab II./JG 27 |
| 38 | 9 April 1942 | 14:25 | P-40 | 30 km (19 mi) southwest of Mteifel Chebir | 4./JG 27 | 64 | 24 October 1942 | 09:45 | P-40 | west-southwest of El Alamein | Stab II./JG 27 |
| 39 | 25 April 1942 | 09:55 | P-40 | 6 km (3.7 mi) north of Ain el Gazala | 4./JG 27 | 65 | 24 October 1942 | 09:50 | P-40 | west of El Alamein | Stab II./JG 27 |
| 40 | 23 May 1942 | 09:40 | P-40 | 10 km (6.2 mi) north of Ras el Tin | Stab II./JG 27 | 66 | 26 October 1942 | 16:08 | Spitfire | southwest of Sanyet Quotaifiya | Stab II./JG 27 |
| 41 | 23 May 1942 | 09:47 | P-40 | 40 km (25 mi) northeast of Ras el Tin | Stab II./JG 27 | 67 | 27 October 1942 | 09:23 | Spitfire | south-southwest of El Hammam | Stab II./JG 27 |
| 42 | 4 June 1942 | 08:15 | P-40 | 3 km (1.9 mi) southeast of Bir Hacheim | Stab II./JG 27 | 68 | 27 October 1942 | 09:42 | P-40 | south-southwest of El Alamein | Stab II./JG 27 |
| 43 | 10 July 1942 | 10:32 | Spitfire | northeast of Miteiriga | Stab II./JG 27 | 69 | 27 October 1942 | 15:05 | P-39 | north of El Dabaa | Stab II./JG 27 |
| 44 | 10 July 1942 | 10:37 | Spitfire | south of Murmin Busak | Stab II./JG 27 | 70 | 29 October 1942 | 09:05 | P-40 | Deir el Bein | Stab II./JG 27 |
| 45 | 10 July 1942 | 10:40 | P-40 | northeast of Miteiriga | Stab II./JG 27 | 71 | 31 October 1942 | 09:52 | P-40 | southwest of Sanyet Quotaifiya | Stab II./JG 27 |
| 46 | 19 July 1942 | 09:13 | Hurricane | Chebel el Gabir | Stab II./JG 27 | 72 | 31 October 1942 | 09:55 | P-40 | southwest of Sanyet Quotaifiya | Stab II./JG 27 |
| 47 | 19 July 1942 | 09:17 | Hurricane | Bir Garbatte | Stab II./JG 27 | 73 | 1 November 1942 | 07:05 | Spitfire | south of Sidi Abdel Rahman | Stab II./JG 27 |
– Claims with Stab of Jagdgeschwader 27 – Sicily — April – June 1943
| 74 | 18 May 1943 | 13:35 | P-38 | northeast of Trapani | Stab/JG 27 | 77 | 22 May 1943 | 16:22 | P-38 | 10 km (6.2 mi) southeast of Marettimo | Stab/JG 27 |
| 75 | 18 May 1943 | 13:44 | B-17 | northeast of Marettimo | Stab/JG 27 | 78 | 22 May 1943 | 16:25 | P-38 | southwest Marettimo | Stab/JG 27 |
| 76 | 22 May 1943 | 16:17 | B-17 | 10 km (6.2 mi) southeast of Marettimo | Stab/JG 27 | | | | | | |
– Claims with Stab of Jagdgeschwader 27 – Aegean Sea — July 1943 – February 1944
| 79? (Note: According to Mathews and Foreman this claim is unconfirmed.) | 2 July 1943 | — | Beaufighter | northwest Melos | Stab/JG 27 | 82 | 8 October 1943 | 14:00 | P-38 | north of Patras | Stab/JG 27 |
| 80 | 4 October 1943 | 12:20 | B-24 | 10 km (6.2 mi) southwest of Kos | Stab/JG 27 | 83 | 10 October 1943 | 12:50 | B-17* | Lamia | Stab/JG 27 |
| 81 | 8 October 1943 | 13:48 | B-25 | 20 km (12 mi) southeast of Livadeia | Stab/JG 27 | | | | | | |
– Claims with Stab of Jagdgeschwader 27 – Defense of the Reich — February – June 1944
| 84 | 19 March 1944 | 13:44 | B-24 | southeast of Graz | Stab/JG 27 | 90 | 12 May 1944 | 12:37 | B-17 | east of Aschaffenburg | Stab/JG 27 |
| 85 | 19 March 1944 | 14:08 | B-24 | 15 km (9.3 mi) east of Graz | Stab/JG 27 | 91? | 12 May 1944 | 12:47 | B-17 | east of Aschaffenburg | Stab/JG 27 |
| 86 | 2 April 1944 | 10:45 | P-47 | northwest of Graz | Stab/JG 27 | 92 | 19 May 1944 | 13:20 | P-51 | PQ 15 Ost S/GC-8, northwest of Magdeburg | Stab/JG 27 |
| 87 | 3 April 1944 | 10:42 | B-17 | 15 km (9.3 mi) south-southwest of Budapest | Stab/JG 27 | 93? | 19 May 1944 | 13:20 | B-24 | PQ 15 Ost S/GC-8, northwest of Magdeburg | Stab/JG 27 |
| 88? | 12 April 1944 | 12:03 | B-17 | Wiener Neustadt | Stab/JG 27 | 94 | 29 May 1944 | 10:15 | B-24 | Sankt Pölten | Stab/JG 27 |
| 89 | 13 April 1944 | 11:48 | B-17 | 3 km (1.9 mi) south of Raab | Stab/JG 27 | | | | | | |
– Claims with Stab of Jagdgeschwader 27 – In defense of the Invasion — June – August 1944
| 95 | 29 June 1944 | 11:50 | P-47 | northwest of Évreux | Stab/JG 27 | 97 | 29 June 1944 | 11:57 | P-47 | northwest of Évreux | Stab/JG 27 |
| 96 | 29 June 1944 | 11:55 | P-47 | northwest of Évreux | Stab/JG 27 | 98 | 5 July 1944 | 21:05 | P-38 | south-southeast of Gaye | Stab/JG 27 |

=== Awards ===
- Spanish Cross in Bronze with Swords (6 June 1939)
- Iron Cross (1939)
  - 2nd Class (17 September 1939)
  - 1st Class (19 June 1940)
- Honour Goblet of the Luftwaffe (Ehrenpokal der Luftwaffe) on 14 December 1940
- German Cross in Gold on 16 July 1942 as Oberleutnant in the II./Jagdgeschwader 27
- Knight's Cross of the Iron Cross with Oak Leaves
  - Knight's Cross on 22 June 1941 as Oberleutnant and Staffelkapitän of the 4./Jagdgeschwader 27 (Note: According to Scherzer on 24 June 1941.)
  - 255th Oak Leaves on 20 June 1943 as Major and Geschwaderkommodore of Jagdgeschwader 27

== Notes ==
Military offices
| Preceded by Oberstleutnant Eduard Neumann | Commander of Jagdgeschwader 27 Afrika; 22 April 1943 – 29 December 1944 | Succeeded by Major Ludwig Franzisket |
| Preceded by Generalmajor Max Ibel | Commander of 2. Jagd-Division; 1 February 1945 – 8 May 1945 | Succeeded by none |
