= Werner Schröer =

German World War II fighter pilot (1918–1985)

- Schröer as a Hauptmann
- Born: 12 February 1918; Mülheim an der Ruhr, German Empire
- Died: 10 February 1985 (aged 66); Ottobrunn, West Germany
- Burial place: park cemetery in Ottobrunn
- Military career
- Allegiance: Nazi Germany
- Branch: Luftwaffe
- Service years: 1937–1945
- Rank: Major (major)
- Units: JG 27, JG 3
- Commands: 8./JG 27, II./JG 27, JG 3
- Conflicts: See battles World War II: Battle of Britain; Mediterranean Theatre; North African Campaign; Battle of Gazala; Allied Invasion of Sicily; Defense of the Reich
- Awards: Knight's Cross of the Iron Cross with Oak Leaves and Swords
- Other work: Messerschmitt-Bölkow-Blohm

Werner Schröer (Note: According to his [Werner Schröer] statement family name was Schroer until 1968 and Schröer from then on.) (12 February 1918 – 10 February 1985) was a German military aviator and wing commander in the Luftwaffe during World War II. As a fighter ace, he was credited with 114 enemy aircraft shot down in 197 combat missions. He claimed twelve aerial victories on the Eastern Front with the remaining claims filed over the Western Allies, including 26 four-engine heavy bombers.

Born in Mülheim an der Ruhr, Schröer joined the Luftwaffe of Nazi Germany in 1937. Initially serving as ground personnel, he was posted to Jagdgeschwader 27 (JG 27—27th Fighter Wing) in August 1940. This unit was transferred to North Africa where on 19 April 1941, Schröer claimed his first aerial victory. In June 1942, he was appointed Staffelkapitän (squadron leader) of 8. Staffel (8th squadron) of JG 27. Schröer was awarded the Knight's Cross of the Iron Cross in October 1942 for 49 victories. In April 1943, Schröer was appointed Gruppenkommandeur (group commander) of II. Gruppe (2nd group) of JG 27 and awarded the Knight's Cross of the Iron Cross with Oak Leaves in August for 85 victories. He then led III. Gruppe of Jagdgeschwader 54 (JG 54—54th Fighter Wing) fighting in defense of the Reich. In February 1945, Schröer was given command of Jagdgeschwader 3 "Udet" (JG 3—3rd Fighter Wing) as Geschwaderkommodore (wing commander). With JG 3, he claimed twelve further aerial victories on the Eastern Front and was awarded Knight's Cross of the Iron Cross with Oak Leaves and Swords in April 1945. After the war, Schröer worked for Messerschmitt-Bölkow-Blohm. He died on 10 February 1985 in Ottobrunn.

== Early life and career ==
Schröer was born on 12 February 1918 in Mülheim an der Ruhr, at the time in the Rhine Province of the Kingdom of Prussia. He was the son of Friedrich Johann Schröer and his wife Maria, née Schmitz. Schröer attended school from 1924 to 1937 and graduated with his Abitur (School Leaving Certificate). From April to October 1937, he then completed the compulsory Reichsarbeitsdienst (Reich Labour Service). Schröer joined the military service with the Luftwaffe of Nazi Germany in 1937. His recruit training began on 3 November 1937 with the 4. Kompanie (4th company) of Fliegerersatzabteilung 24 (24th Flier Replacement Unit) in Quakenbrück. On 1 April 1938, he was transferred to the Flughafenbetriebskompanie (Airport Operation Company) of Jagdgeschwader 132 (JG 132—132nd Fighter Wing) to Düsseldorf, serving with the ground personnel.

On 1 July 1938, Schröer was posted to the 7. Staffel (7th squadron) of Jagdgeschwader 234 (JG 234th—234th Fighter Wing) where his flight training began. He then served with the Fliegerhorstkompanie (Airfield Company) in Düsseldorf from 13 August 1938 to 30 June 1939. While serving with this unit, he was promoted to Gefreiter (airman first class) on 1 October 1938 and to Unteroffizier (corporal) on 1 April 1939. (Note: For an explanation of Luftwaffe unit designations see Organization of the Luftwaffe during World War II.) On 1 July 1939, Schröer was then transferred to II. Gruppe (2nd group) of Jagdgeschwader 26 "Schlageter" (JG 26—26th Fighter Wing), named after the Nazi martyr Albert Leo Schlageter, where he was posted to the 6. Staffel where he made his first flight. From 1 September to 15 October 1939, Schröer attended an air observer course at the Aufklärungsfliegerschule (Reconnaissance Flying School) at Hildesheim. Schröer then continued his pilot training at the flight schools in Kamp and Schafstädt . On 16 May 1940, he completed his flight training with Flugkommando 23 (Flight Commando) in Braunschweig. During this training period, he was promoted to Feldwebel (sergeant) on 1 December 1939. Schröer then received fighter pilot training at the Jagdfliegerschule 1 (fighter pilot school) at Werneuchen. There he learned to fly the Arado Ar 68 and Ar 96, the Messerschmitt Bf 108 and Messerschmitt Bf 109, the Bücker Bü 131, the Focke-Wulf Fw 56, and the Heinkel He 45 and He 51. From 22 July to 17 August 1940, Schröer completed his fighter pilot training with the 2. Staffel of Ergänzungsjagdgruppe Merseburg, a supplementary training unit based in Merseburg.

== World War II ==
World War II in Europe began on Friday 1 September 1939 when German forces invaded Poland. On 20 August 1940, Schröer was transferred to the 2. Staffel of Jagdgeschwader 27 (JG 27—27th Fighter Wing), a front line fighter unit. JG 27 at the time was under the command of Oberst (Colonel) Max Ibel and based in Plumetot, France on the Channel Front. There, JG 27 was subordinated to Jagdfliegerführer 3 (Jafü 3), the fighter force commander of Luftflotte 3 under the command of Generalfeldmarschall (Field Marshal) Hugo Sperrle, and fought in the Battle of Britain (10 July – 31 October 1940). On 28 August 1940, JG 27 relocated from the vicinity of the Cotentin Peninsula to an airfield at Peuplingues, about 6 kilometers (3.7 mi) southwest of Calais and subsequently was placed under the command of Jagdfliegerführer 2. Operating over the English Channel and southern England, Schröer flew his first combat missions and claimed three aerial victories which were not confirmed.

I. Gruppe was withdrawn from the Channel Front on 30 September 1940. Relocation to Stade, west of Hamburg, began on 1 October. There, I. Gruppe was placed under the command of Geschwaderstab (headquarters unit) of Jagdgeschwader 1 (JG 1—1st Fighter Wing). During the following three weeks, I. Gruppe was tasked with flying combat air patrols over the German Bight. In parallel, the Gruppe replenished its losses of 14 men killed or missing in action, four wounded and seven taken prisoner of war, losses sustained while fighting over Britain. Also the losses in aircraft had to be replenished and the equipment underwent a maintenance overhaul. On 21 October, I. Gruppe was again ordered to France, then based at Dinan in northeastern Brittany under the command of Jafü 3 again. On 3 December, I. Gruppe relocated again, this time to Döberitz with the orders to provide fighter protection for Berlin. Following the arrival in Döberitz, the majority of the flying and ground personnel were sent on vacation. Between end-February to early March 1941, the I. Gruppe relocated to Munich-Riem where it stayed for four weeks. On 24 February, the pilots of 1. and 2. Staffel were temporarily sent to Sicily where they flew missions against Malta, protecting the German naval convoys taking the Afrika Korps to Tripoli. During this period, 2. Staffel was based at Comiso. From 7 to 10 March, the pilots returned to Munich-Riem. During this brief interlude, Schröer was promoted to Leutnant (second lieutenant) and transferred to 1. Staffel on 1 March. (Note: According to Stockert, Schröer was promoted to Leutnant (second lieutenant) on 1 October 1941.) On 4 April 1941, the Gruppe relocated to Graz in preparation of operation Operation Marita, the Battle of Greece. On 11 April, I. Gruppe flew fighter escort missions for Junkers Ju 87 dive bombers in this campaign. The next day, the unit deployed to Zagreb before transferring to Africa.

=== North Africa ===
On 15 April 1941, the first elements of 1. and 2. Staffel began relocation to North Africa to Tripoli. From Tripoli, the Staffeln were ordered to Ayn al-Ġazāla airfield, west of Tobruk, where they arrived between 18 and 24 April 1941. Schröer was credited with his first aerial victory on 19 April, a Royal Air Force (RAF) Hawker Hurricane fighter of the No. 274 Squadron shot down near Tobruk. That day, the Gruppe claimed its first four victories in Africa. In this encounter, Schröer was shot down in his Bf 109 E-7 (Werknummer 3790—factory number), resulting in a forced landing at Ayn al-Ġazāla. Schröer's victor was Pilot Officer Spence. Schröer was the first German Bf 109 pilot shot down in Africa. For this, Schröer was awarded the Iron Cross 2nd Class (Eisernes Kreuz zweiter Klasse). Two days later, on 21 April, I. Gruppe engaged in combat with Hurricane fighters over Tobruk, claiming one victory by Oberfeldwebel Albert Espenlaub for the loss of Unteroffizier Hans Sippel who was killed in action. Schröer's Bf 109 E-7 (Werknummer 4170—factory number) also sustained combat damage in this encounter. He managed to fly his aircraft back to Ayn al-Ġazāla, making another forced landing and slightly injuring himself. It is possible that his victor was Pilot Officer Spence, making it the second time in 48 hours the RAF pilot shot him down.

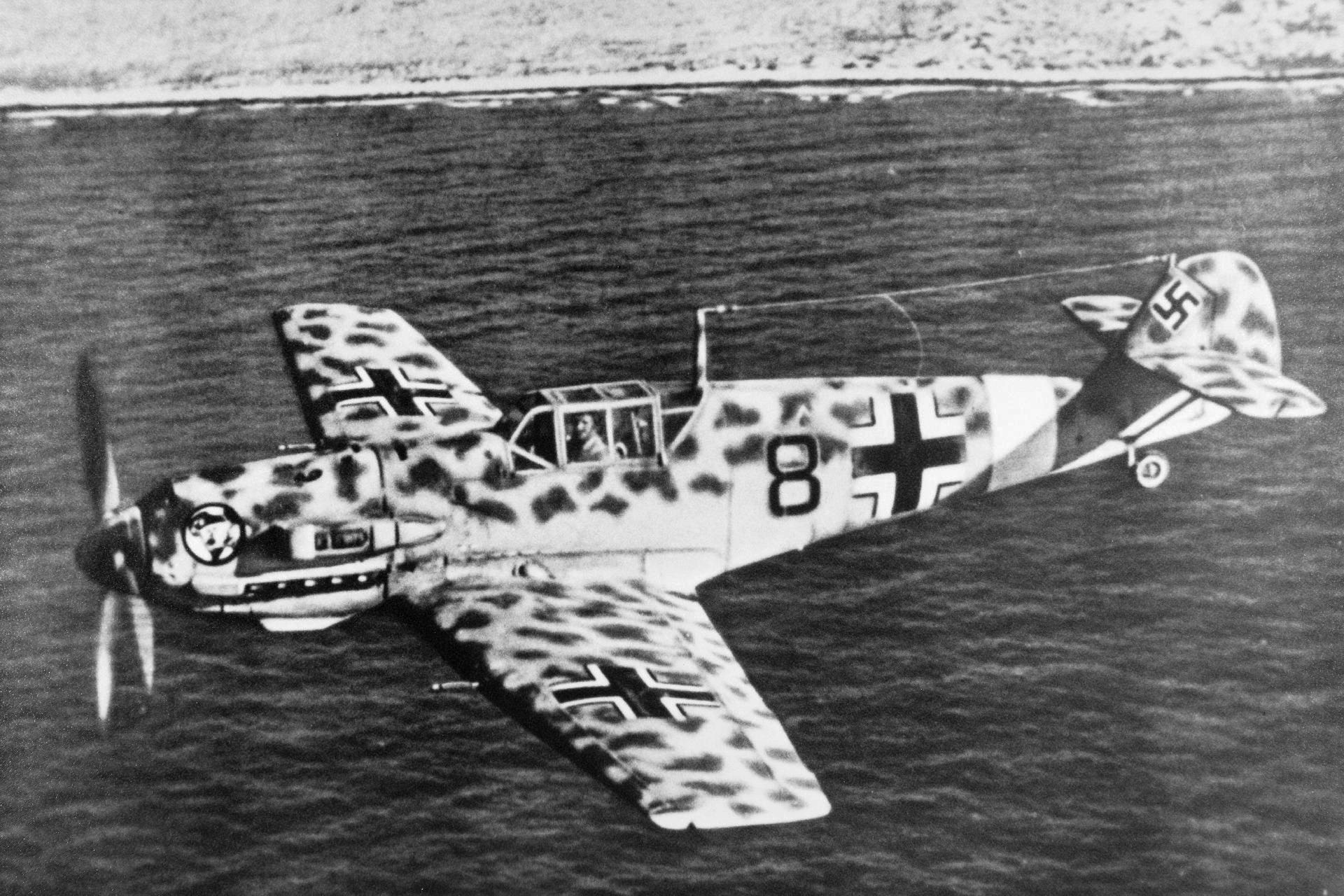
Bf 109 E-4/trop "black 8" of JG 27, Schröer flew this aircraft on account of pictures taken by the Reich Ministry of Public Enlightenment and Propaganda.

Schröer claimed his second aerial victory over two months later. On 25 June, he claimed a Hurricane shot down, presumably from 2 Squadron of the South African Air Force (SAAF). On 8 July, Schröer claimed another Hurricane shot down in combat west of Bardia. On 19 July 1941, a flight of three Schwärme, flights of four aircraft, from I. Gruppe encountered a mixed flight of Hurricanes and Curtiss P-40 "Tomahawk" fighters on a combat air patrol north of Sidi Barrani. Twelve Hurricanes from No. 73 Squadron RAF, augmented by P-40s from 2 Squadron SAAF, provided fighter escort for Allied shipping destined for Tobruk. In this encounter, the Germans claimed three victories without sustaining any losses. Schröer was credited with his fourth victory that day, a P-40 claimed at 18:17 northeast Ras Asaz. On 21 August, Schröer claimed his fifth victory, a Hurricane from No. 229 Squadron on an escort mission for a flight of Martin Maryland bombers from 24 Squadron SAAF on a bombing mission to Menastir, near Bardia.

On 29 August 1941, Schröer engaged in aerial combat with the top Australian ace Clive Caldwell of No. 250 Squadron RAF north-west of Sidi Barrani. In the course of the battle Schröer damaged Caldwell's P-40 "Tomahawk". Caldwell suffered bullet wounds to the back, left shoulder, and leg but was still able to shoot down Schröer's wingman and heavily damage Schröer's own aircraft and thus forced him to disengage. According to Prien, Rodeike and Stemmer, authors of Messerschmitt Bf 109 im Einsatz bei Stab und I./Jagdgeschwader 27, 1939 – 1945 [Messerschmitt Bf 109 in Action with the Headquarters Unit and I./Jagdgeschwader 27, 1939 – 1945], I. Gruppe did not record any loss or damaged aircraft in this encounter. On 3 September, Schröer was awarded the Iron Cross 1st Class (Eisernes Kreuz erster Klasse). In support of German ground forces on 14 September, Schröer claimed his seventh aerial victory when he shot down a Hurricane. The next day, he received the Front Flying Clasp of the Luftwaffe in Silver (Frontflugspange in Silber). In late October, I. Gruppe was reequipped with the Bf 109 F-4/trop. To retain operation status, 1. and 3. Staffel left North Africa on 22 October while 2. Staffel stayed. In Italy they handed over their Bf 109 E variants and continued the journey back home by train. The pilots were sent on a short home-leave before returning to Ayn al-Ġazāla on 10 November.

On 21 January 1942, Generalleutnant Erwin Rommel launched his counter-offensive in the area of Ajdabiya. Within one week, German forces reached Msus and from here they advanced towards Benghazi on 27 January, reaching Timimi on 10 February. This offensive negated much of the territory lost during Operation Crusader fought from 18 November to 30 December 1941. In March, Schröer became Gruppen-Adjutant, adjutant in I. Gruppe of JG 27 learning command under the experienced Eduard Neumann, they were back at Martuba, east of Derna. He succeeded Leutnant Hans-Arnold Stahlschmidt who was transferred in this capacity. Schröer claimed his first aerial victory while flying with the Gruppenstab (headquarters unit) on 30 May over a P-40 northeast of Bir Hacheim during the Battle of Gazala. On 10 June, he claimed another P-40 near Bir Hacheim. On 15 June, I. Gruppe escorted Ju 87s to Acroma. On this mission, Schröer claimed two P-40s shot down near Al Adm.

=== Squadron leader ===
Schröer was transferred to 8. Staffel of JG 27, a squadron of III. Gruppe, in June 1942. Schröer, who was scheduled to take command of 8. Staffel, flew his first combat mission with this unit on 23 June. On this mission, he claimed his 12th aerial victory, a P-40 shot down south of Sidi Omar. His most successful day to date was 26 June when Schröer claimed three aerial victories following the Axis capture of Tobruk. That day, he shot down a Hurricane and two P-40s near Mersa Matruh. On 1 July, Schröer was appointed Staffelkapitän (squadron leader) of 8. Staffel of JG 27, based further forward at Fuka, succeeding Oberleutnant Hans Lass. That day, Axis (German and Italian) forces launched the First Battle of El Alamein.

With Rommel charging 500 kilometers (310 miles) onto El Alamein, the Gruppe moved to Bi'r Mu'min Busak located approximately 5 kilometers (3.1 miles) west of Sidi Abdel Rahman. On 2 July, five Bf 109s intercepted RAF bombers and their escort fighters. In the resulting encounter Schröer claimed two P-40s near El Alamein. The following day, Schröer led a flight of four Bf 109s to El Alamein. The flight encountered 8 to 10 Hurricanes and P-40s. In this engagement, Schröer claimed two Hurricanes and a P-40 shot down, taking his total to 20 aerial victories. On 4 July, the airfield at Mu'min Busak came under attack. Engaging the attacking aircraft, Schröer claimed a P-40 destroyed. Two days later, he claimed two further P-40s shot down. On 8 July, the Gruppe moved to a makeshift airfield named Quotaifiya, located approximately 50 kilometers (31 miles) east of Fuka. Schröer then claimed a Supermarine Spitfire fighter and a P-40 on 11 July, followed by three Hurricanes on 13 July. The next day, Schröer shot down a P-40 southwest of El Alamein. He was credited with his 30th aerial victory on 16 July when he again claimed a P-40 southwest of El Alamein. The next day, he shot down another P-40 near El Alamein.

On 22 July, III. Gruppe moved to an airfield named Haggag el Qasaba located approximately 35 kilometers (22 miles) southeast of Mersa Matruh. When on 26/27 July, the Battle of El Alamein ended with a stalemate, aerial combat for III. Gruppe lessoned. Aerial combat increased again on Rommel launched Unternehmen Brandung (Operation Surf) leading to the Battle of Alam el Halfa. Following his 31st aerial victory, Schröer was awarded the Honor Goblet of the Luftwaffe (Ehrenpokal der Luftwaffe) in August 1942. (Note: Various authors present different dates for the presentation of the Honor Goblet of the Luftwaffe. According to Obermaier, the goblet was presented on 5 August 1942. Schumann gives a presentation date of 6 August 1942, while Patzwall states 10 August 1942.) On 3 September, the Gruppe was moved closer to El Alamein and moved to an airfield named Turbiya located approximately halfway between El Dabaa and El Alamein. Here on 8 September, Schröer claimed two Spitfires shot down, his 32nd and 33rd aerial victories. The following day, he was awarded the German Cross in Gold (Deutsches Kreuz in Gold).

On 15 September, Schröer claimed six aerial victories, five P-40s and a Spitfire, making him an "ace-in-a-day" and taking his total to 40 aerial victories. According to Brown, these claims on 15 September are a matter of controversy. That day, JG 27 submitted claims for 26 aircraft shot down—including six by Schröer. In fact only five Allied aircraft were shot down in aerial combat that day. That day, Schröer's Front Flying Clasp of the Luftwaffe was upgraded to Gold (Frontflugspange in Gold). On 30 September, Schröer was leading 8. Staffel on a Ju 87 escort mission covering the withdrawal of the group and relieving the outward escort, III. Gruppe of Jagdgeschwader 53 (JG 53—53rd Fighter Wing), which had been deployed to support JG 27 in Africa. Hans-Joachim Marseille's 3. Staffel visually sighted the RAF fighters but were unable to make contact. Marseille vectored Schröer onto the enemy aircraft. Marseille heard Schröer claim a Spitfire over the radio at 10:30. Both flights remained airborne over the next hour on patrol. At 11:30 Marseille radioed his engine was smoking and his flight escorted him to German lines. Marseille bailed out but struck the vertical stabilizer and fell to earth without his parachute deploying. Schröer arrived near 3. Staffel in time to see Marseille's Bf 109 hit the ground but saw no parachute. He later learned of Marseille's death.

He continued claiming regularly in October, downing further fifteen aircraft. Schröer was awarded the Knight's Cross of the Iron Cross (Ritterkreuz des Eisernen Kreuzes) on 21 October for 49 victories. Two days later, Montgomery launched his victorious Second Battle of El Alamein. In the frantic air battles overhead, Schröer shot down 10 aircraft in a week. On 1 November, he was promoted to Oberleutnant (first lieutenant). Three days later, III. Gruppe relocated to Benghazi. That day, the United States Army Air Forces (USAAF) attacked the harbor at Benghazi. Defending against this attack, Schröer claimed his 60th aerial victory when he shot down a Consolidated B-24 Liberator heavy bomber between Sollum and Benghazi.

On 12 November, the air elements of III. Gruppe were withdrawn from North Africa and was ordered to regroup on Crete while the ground personnel were reassigned to Jagdgeschwader 77 (JG 77—77th Fighter Wing). While based at Kasteli Airfield, the Gruppe was replenished with new pilots and a few Bf 109 G-2 trop aircraft. The time was spent with training flights. On 18 January 1943, Schröer was ordered to relocate his 8. Staffel to Rhodes Airfield. Here, the Staffel was tasked with protecting German and Italian shipping from attacks by RAF bombers and torpedo bombers in the Aegean Sea. Here, Schröer was promoted to Hauptmann on 1 February. On 11 February, on a shuttle flight from Rhodes to Crete, Schröer intercepted and claimed two light bombers which he identified as Bristol Beaufort bombers north-northeast Karpathos. RAF records show that two Martin B-26 Marauder bombers were lost on 15 February and the time of the claims filed by Schröer. Authors Prien, Rodeike and Stemmer argue that at the time the B-26 was a new and unknown aircraft type to Schröer while the date discrepancy cannot be explained. After that he had extended leave at home for his wedding.

=== Sicily and Italy ===
II./JG 27 emblem

On 22 April 1943, a number of command position were changed, impacting Schröer. The Geschwaderkommodore (wing commander), Eduard Neumann was ordered to the staff of the General der Jagdflieger (General of Fighters) Adolf Galland. The vacancy in the Geschwaderkommodore position was back-filled by the Gruppenkommandeur (group commander) of II. Gruppe of JG 27 based at Trapani in Sicily, Gustav Rödel who surrendered his command to Schröer. In consequence, command of 8. Staffel was passed to Oberleutnant Dietrich Boesler. The Gruppe was up against complete Allied air superiority and had the hopeless task of trying to protect transport aircraft making desperate evacuation flights of remaining wounded and specialists out of the beleaguered Afrika Korps, now bottled up in Tunis. Just before Schröer took over command, on the evening of 18 April, only 6 transports had made it to Sicily out of 65 leaving Tunis. Flying at sea level, half had been shot down and the remainder turned back damaged. On 29 April, Schröer claimed two Lockheed P-38 Lightning fighters shot down, his 64th and 65th aerial victories. II. Gruppe had intercepted P-38s from the USAAF 95th Fighter Squadron heading for Cape Bon. In the resulting head-on encounter, II. Gruppe pilots claimed three P-38s shot down, including two by Schröer, for no loss of their own. While 95th Fighter Squadron pilots claimed six aerial victories and three further probable for the loss of two of their own.

On 5 May, II. Gruppe flew fighter protection for the cargo ship SS San Antonio (6,013 GRT), escorted by a torpedo boat, heading for Bizerte. The ship came under attack by 26 B-24s which sank the San Antonio. In an attempt to protect the ship, Schröer was credited with the destruction of one B-24 bomber northwest Marettimo. On 9 May, Sicily came under heavy aerial attacks. That day, Schröer claimed a B-24 and a P-38 shot down over sea. In support of the German retreat from North Africa on 11 May, Schröer claimed a Boeing B-17 Flying Fortress heavy bomber near Cape Bon and an escorting P-38 shot near Marsala. On 19 June, II. Gruppe of JG 27 was ordered to relocate to Lecce, located at the heel of the Italian Peninsula where they arrived on 20 June. Operation Husky, the Allied invasion of Sicily, started on 10 July.

On 28 July, the unit was ordered to hand its aircraft over to other units and the pilots and crews returned to Germany for much-needed rest and re-equipment. At Foggia, the remaining aircraft were handed over to Jagdgeschwader 3 (JG 3—3rd Fighter Wing), JG 53 and JG 77. The pilots took a train to Vienna-Aspern. On 2 August, Schröer was awarded the Knight's Cross of the Iron Cross with Oak Leaves (Ritterkreuz des Eisernen Kreuzes mit Eichenlaub), his tally at the time was 85 victories. The presentation was made by Adolf Hitler at the Wolf's Lair, Hitler's headquarters in Rastenburg, present-day Kętrzyn in Poland. Five other Luftwaffe officers were presented with awards that day by Hitler, Hauptmann Egmont Prinz zur Lippe-Weißenfeld, Hauptmann Manfred Meurer, Hauptmann Heinrich Ehrler, Oberleutnant Joachim Kirschner, Oberleutnant Theodor Weissenberger were also awarded the Oak Leaves, and Major Helmut Lent received the Swords to his Knight's Cross with Oak Leaves.

=== In defense of the Reich ===
In late July 1943, II. Gruppe of JG 27 was ordered back to Germany. At first ordered to Wiesbaden-Erbenheim Airfield, where they arrived on 9 August, the unit then moved to Eschborn Airfield on 20 August. There, the Gruppe received new Bf 109 G-6 aircraft and replacement pilots and trained for defense of the Reich missions. On 6 September, II. Gruppe flew its first operational combat mission when the USAAF VIII Bomber Command targeted Stuttgart. At 10:45, the Gruppe intercepted a B-17 formation near Stuttgart. In this encounter, pilots of II. Gruppe claimed nine aerial victories, six were later confirmed including three by Schröer. II. Gruppe was ordered to Saint-Dizier Airfield in France on 12 September. On 14 October during the second Schweinfurt raid at 13:28, II. Gruppe was scrambled at Saint-Dizier and intercepted approximately 150 bombers without escorting fighter protection shortly after 14:00 over the Palatinate. During this aerial battle, Luftwaffe pilots of II. Gruppe claimed nine bombers shot down, including a B-17 near Alzey by Schröer for his 89th aerial victory. On 1 November 1943, Schröer was promoted to Major (major). The Gruppe returned to Wiesbaden-Erbenheim Airfield on 18 November. The USAAF attacked Bremen on 29 November. Defending against this attack, Schröer claimed his 90th aerial victory when he shot down a B-17 south-southwest of Bremen.

On 7 January 1944, Schröer was credited with the destruction of a P-38 piloted by Joseph P. Marsiglia of the 55th Fighter Group, 338th Fighter Squadron. Marsiglia had to bail out and was apprehended near Holz in the district of Saarbrücken. This was Schröer's 92nd aerial victory. On 11 January 1944, VIII Bomber Command targeted German aircraft production in central Germany, attacking the cities Halberstadt, Magdeburg, Oschersleben and Braunschweig. In total, the USAAF dispatched 663 heavy bombers, escorted by 592 fighter aircraft. The attack however did not proceed as planned and the bombers of the 2nd and 3rd Bombardment Division were ordered to return prior to reaching the target area and bombed various "targets of opportunity" in the area of Osnabrück, Bielefeld, Herford, Meppen and Lingen. In consequence of this order, the USAAF fighter protection was dispersed. II. Gruppe of JG 27 was scrambled at 11:47 and vectored to a formation of B-24 bombers near Assen. In this encounter, II. Gruppe pilots claimed seven aerial victories and two Herausschüsse (separation shot)—a severely damaged heavy bomber forced to separate from its combat box which was counted as an aerial victory. Schröer was credited with the destruction of a B-24 bomber and an Herausschuss of a second B-24 bomber.

On 14 March 1944, Schröer was appointed Gruppenkommandeur, III. Gruppe of Jagdgeschwader 54 (JG 54—54th Fighter Wing). Schröer succeeded Hauptmann Rudolf Klemm who had temporarily led the Gruppe after its former commander, Hauptmann Rudolf Sinner had been wounded on 10 March. At the time, the Gruppe was based at Lüneburg Airfield and subordinated to 2. Jagd-Division (2nd Fighter Division). On 20 April, III. Gruppe relocated to Landau an der Isar for conversion training to the Focke-Wulf Fw 190. In consequence of this relocation, the Gruppe came under the control of 7. Jagd-Division (7th Fighter Division). Conversion training was relatively short and the Gruppe flew its first mission on the Fw 190 against attacking USAAF heavy bombers on 19 May.

On 24 May, Schröer claimed a North American P-51 Mustang fighter and two B-17s, making him the 73rd Luftwaffe pilot to achieve the century mark. When Allied forces launched Operation Overlord, the invasion of German-occupied Western Europe on 6 June, III. Gruppe was immediately ordered to relocate to Villacoublay Airfield. That day, the Gruppe reached Nancy, arriving in Villacoublay the following day where it was subordinated to II. Fliegerkorps (2nd Air Corps). Its primary objective was to fly fighter-bomber missions in support of the German ground forces. The Gruppe flew its first missions on 7 June to the combat area east of Caen and the Orne estuary. But the worsening situation and the intense pressure was taking its toll, and he was sent on a month's stress-leave in early June just as Allied attention turned to Normandy, possibly saving his life as the unit took very heavy losses in France. On 6 June, he was temporarily replaced by Hauptmann Robert Weiß as commander of III. Gruppe and officially replaced by Weiß on 21 June.

Returning to duty, from 5 November 1944 to 5 February 1945, Schröer was senior instructor at the Verbandsführerschule (Training School for Unit Leaders) of the General der Jagdflieger at Königsberg in der Neumark, present-day Chojna in western Poland. In mid-February 1945, Schröer assumed command of JG 3 "Udet", named after Ernst Udet, from Oberstleutnant Heinrich Bär who had transferred to jet fighters. On 14 February, Schröer was officially appointed Geschwaderkommodore of JG 3 "Udet". The Geschwader was deployed in eastern Germany, initially subordinated to Luftflotte 6 and then under Luftwaffenkommando Nordost, where it fought over the lower Oder in the Battle of the Oder–Neisse. There, he claimed 12 Soviet aircraft destroyed - his only victories not on the Western Front. On 19 April 1945, he received the Knight's Cross of the Iron Cross with Oak Leaves and Swords (Ritterkreuz des Eisernen Kreuzes mit Eichenlaub und Schwertern) following his 110th aerial victory. The bestowal of the Swords to his Knight's Cross cannot be verified via the records held in the German Federal Archives. Schröer presented evidence of the conferment which was confirmed by the Gemeinschaft der Jagdflieger (Association of German Armed Forces Airmen). The presentation date 19 April 1945 is an assumption of the Association of Knight's Cross Recipients (AKCR). The Geschwaderstab withdrew along the Baltic coast into Schleswig-Holstein. There, on 5 May 1945, Schröer surrendered to British forces and was taken prisoner of war.

== Later life ==
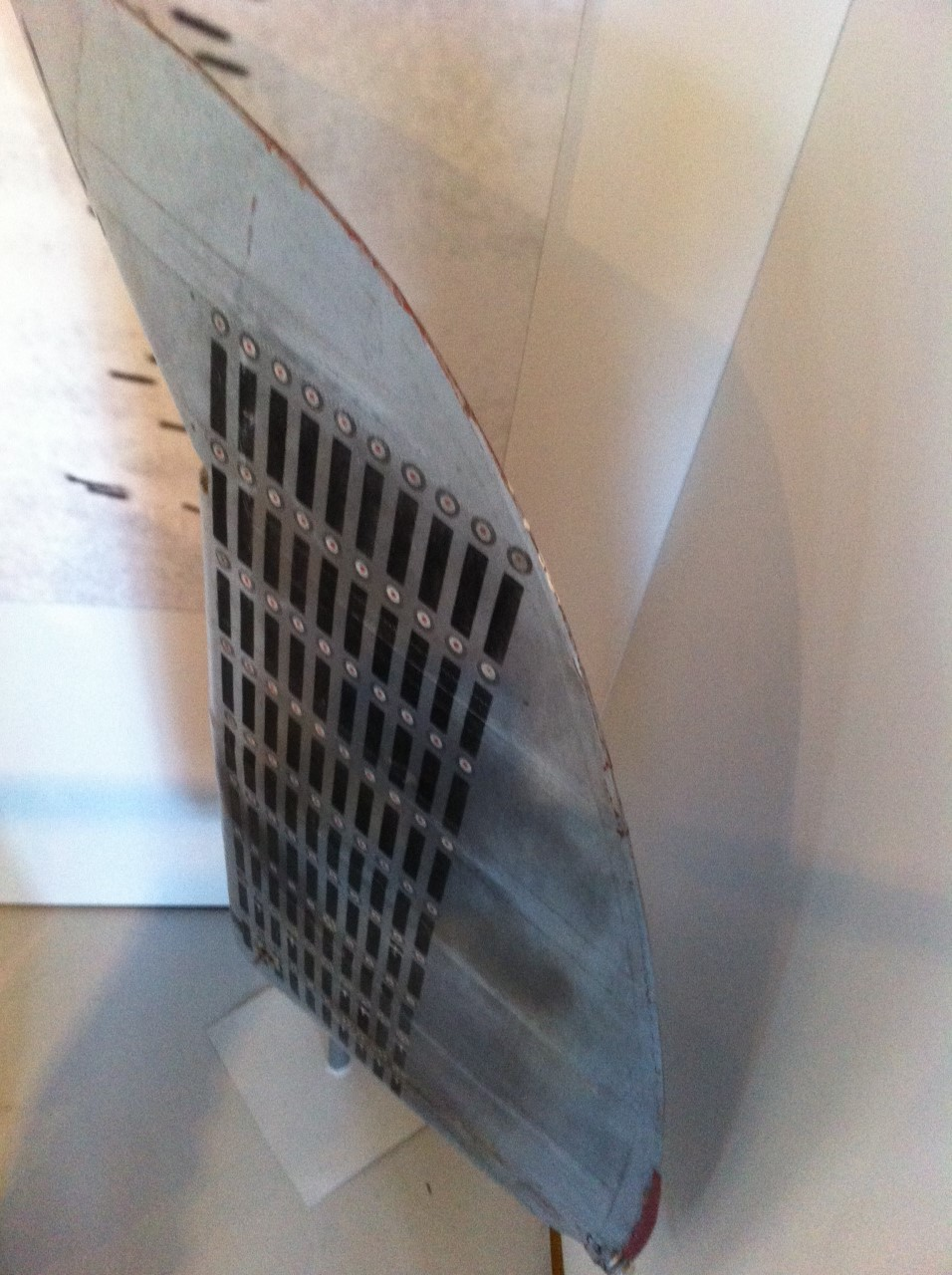
Schröer's Bf 109 rudder with 90 victory markings. This rudder is on display at the Militärhistorisches Museum Flugplatz Berlin-Gatow.

Schröer was kept in British custody until 7 February 1946. Initially he worked as a Taxicab driver in Frankfurt to help finance his family. In parallel, he attended university attaining a Master of Business Administration (Diplom-Kaufmann). Together with his family, he then lived and worked in Rome, Italy for eleven years. In 1968, the spelling of his last name changed from Schroer to Schröer, with the Umlaut "ö". Prior to his retirement, he held the position of head of the central protocol department with Messerschmitt-Bölkow-Blohm in Ottobrunn. Schröer died on 10 February 1985 in Ottobrunn, aged 66. He was buried with military honors at the Parkfriedhof (park cemetery) in Ottobrunn on 15 February 1985.

== Summary of career ==
=== Aerial victory claims ===
According to US historian David T. Zabecki, Schröer was credited with 114 aerial victories. Spick and Obermaier also list Schröer with 114 enemy aircraft shot down claimed in 197 combat missions, the majority of which on the Western Front, including 61 in North Africa and 22 in Italy, and a mission-to-claim ratio of 1.73. This figure includes 26 four-engined bombers, four of which claimed as Herausschüsse (separation shots). Mathews and Foreman, authors of Luftwaffe Aces – Biographies and Victory Claims, researched the German Federal Archives and found records for 106 aerial victory claims, plus eight further unconfirmed claims. This figure includes 12 aerial victories on the Eastern Front and 94 over the Western Allies, including 23 four-engined heavy bombers.

=== Awards ===
- Wound Badge in Black
- Front Flying Clasp of the Luftwaffe in Gold
  - in Silver (15 September 1941)
  - in Gold (15 September 1942)
- Combined Pilots-Observation Badge
- Honor Goblet of the Luftwaffe (Ehrenpokal der Luftwaffe) on 10 August 1942 as Leutnant and pilot (Note: According to Obermaier on 5 August 1942. Schumann gives a presentation date of 6 August 1942.)
- Italian Silver Medal of Military Valor
- German Cross in Gold on 9 September 1942 as Leutnant in the III./Jagdgeschwader 27
- Iron Cross (1939)
  - 2nd class (19 April 1941)
  - 1st class (9 September 1941)
- Knight's Cross of the Iron Cross with Oak Leaves and Swords
  - Knight's Cross on 20 October 1942 as Leutnant (war officer) and Staffelführer of the 8./Jagdgeschwader 27
  - 268th Oak Leaves on 2 August 1943 as Hauptmann (war officer) and Gruppenkommandeur of the II./Jagdgeschwader 27
  - (144th) Swords on 19 April 1945 as Major (war officer) and Geschwaderkommodore of Jagdgeschwader 3 "Udet" (Note: According to Scherzer on 16 April 1945. The sequential numbers greater than 143 for the Knight's Cross of the Iron Cross with Oak Leaves and Swords are unofficial and were assigned by the Association of Knight's Cross Recipients (AKCR) and are therefore denoted in parentheses.)

=== Dates of rank ===
| 1 October 1938: | Gefreiter |
| 1 April 1939: | Unteroffizier |
| 1 December 1939: | Feldwebel |
| 1 March 1941: | Leutnant (Second Lieutenant) |
| 1 November 1942: | Oberleutnant (First Lieutenant) |
| 1 February 1943: | Hauptmann (Captain) |
| 1 November 1943: | Major (Major) |

== Notes ==
Military offices
| Preceded by Oberleutnant Hans Lass | Squadron Leader of 8./JG 27; 1 July 1942 – 21 April 1943 | Succeeded by Oberleutnant Dietrich Boesler |
| Preceded by Hauptmann Gustav Rödel | Group Commander of II./JG 27; 22 April 1943 – 13 March 1944 | Succeeded by Hauptmann Friedrich Keller |
| Preceded by Hauptmann Rudolf Sinner | Group Commander of III./JG 54; 14 March 1944 – 20 July 1944 | Succeeded by Hauptmann Robert Weiß |
| Preceded by Major Heinrich Bär | Commander of Jagdgeschwader 3 Udet; 14 February 1945 – 8 May 1945 | Succeeded by none: end of war |
