= Joseph Schmid =

German military officer during World War II

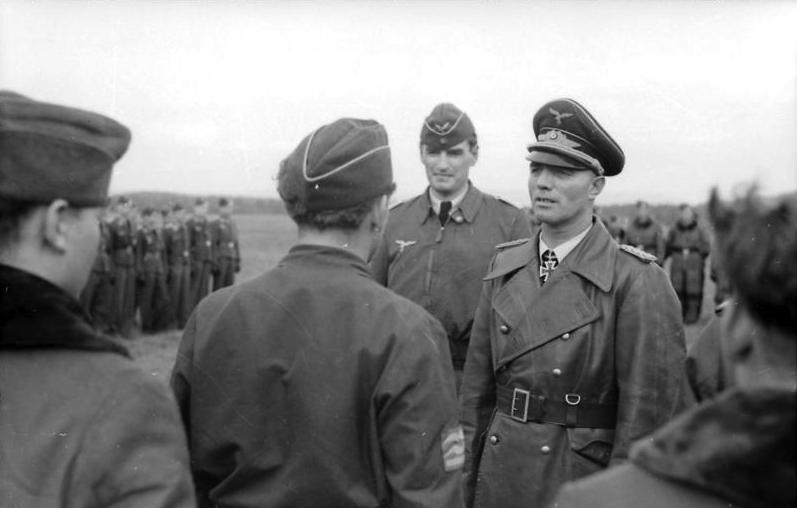
- Born: 24 September 1901; Göggingen, Kingdom of Württemberg, German Empire
- Died: 30 August 1956 (aged 54); Augsburg, Bavaria, West Germany (now Germany)
- Military career
- Allegiance: Weimar Republic; Nazi Germany
- Branch: Luftwaffe
- Service years: 1924–1945
- Rank: Generalleutnant
- Conflicts: World War II
- Awards: Knight's Cross of the Iron Cross

Joseph "Beppo" Schmid (24 September 1901 – 30 August 1956) was a German general who served in the Luftwaffe during World War II. Schmid commanded the Luftwaffe's Military Intelligence Branch during the Battle of Britain.

== Career ==
A close friend of Hermann Göring, Schmid commanded the Luftwaffe's Military Intelligence Branch (Abteilung 5 as Chief IC) from 1 January 1938 to 9 November 1942. Adolf Galland later criticized Schmid for doing nothing to upgrade the low quality of the intelligence service. Schmid was accused of inventing intelligence situation data about British aircraft losses during the Battle of Britain. In late 1942 he was put in charge of Division "General Göring" in Tunisia, known as Kampfgruppe Schmid. On personal orders from Göring, Schmid was flown out of the Tunisian pocket. Promoted to Generalmajor on 1 February 1943 and Generalleutnant on 1 July 1944 he was given command of the 1st Fighter Corps (15 September 1943 – 15 November 1944). He was made commander of the Luftwaffenkommando West, formerly Luftflotte 3 on 23 November 1944. Schmid commanded the German forces involved in Operation Bodenplatte on 1 January 1945, the operation achieved tactical surprise, but that was undone by poor planning and execution. Bodenplatte was ultimately a failure and exhausted the Luftwaffe's remaining units. Schmid also commanded German air units during the Defense of the Reich.

Schmid's leadership qualities are disputed. Historian Antony Beevor called him the "most disastrous intelligence officer the Wehrmacht ever produced". Erik Larson was likewise harshly critical of Schmid in ''The Splendid and the Vile'' (2020).

== Awards ==
- Iron Cross (1939) 2nd and 1st Class
- Knight's Cross of the Iron Cross on 21 May 1944 as Generalmajor and commander of the in Tunisia deployed detachment of the Division "General Göring"

Military offices
Preceded by none	Commander of 1. Jagdkorps; 15 September 1943 – 30 November 1944	Succeeded by Generalleutnant Joachim-Friedrich Huth
