= Polish 123rd Fighter Escadrille =

123rd Fighter Escadrille
- 123 Eskadra Myśliwska
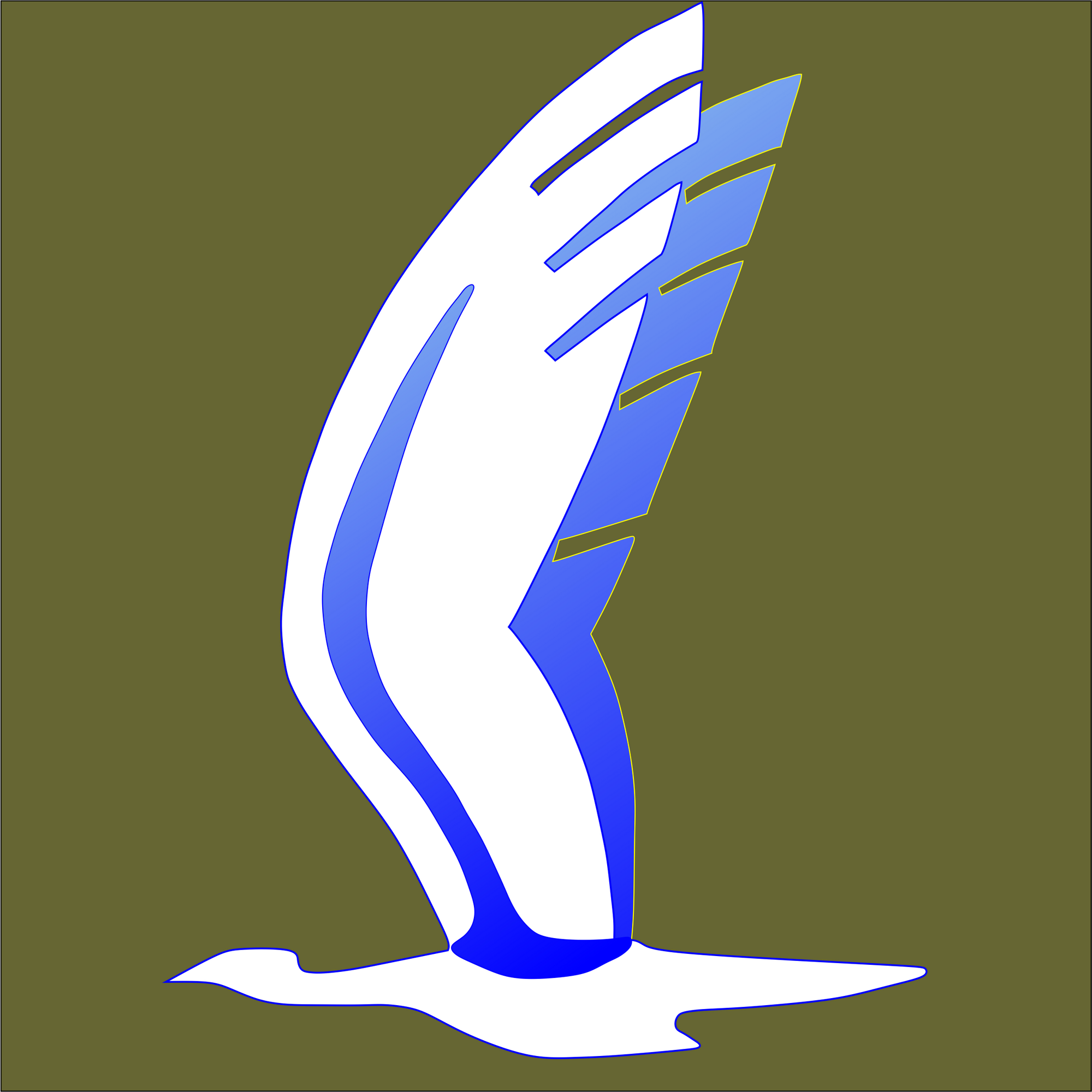
- Active: October 1933 - September 1939
- Country: Poland
- Branch: Polish Air Force
- Role: Fighter Squadron
- Size: 11 Pilots
- Part of: 2nd Air Regiment
- Engagements: World War II: Invasion of Poland

Commanders
- Notable commanders: Kpt pil. Mieczysław Leonard Olszewski

Aircraft flown
- Fighter: Avia BH-33; PZL P.11

The 123rd Fighter Escadrille of the Polish Air Force (Polish: 123. eskadra myśliwska) was one of the fighter units of the Polish Army in 1939.

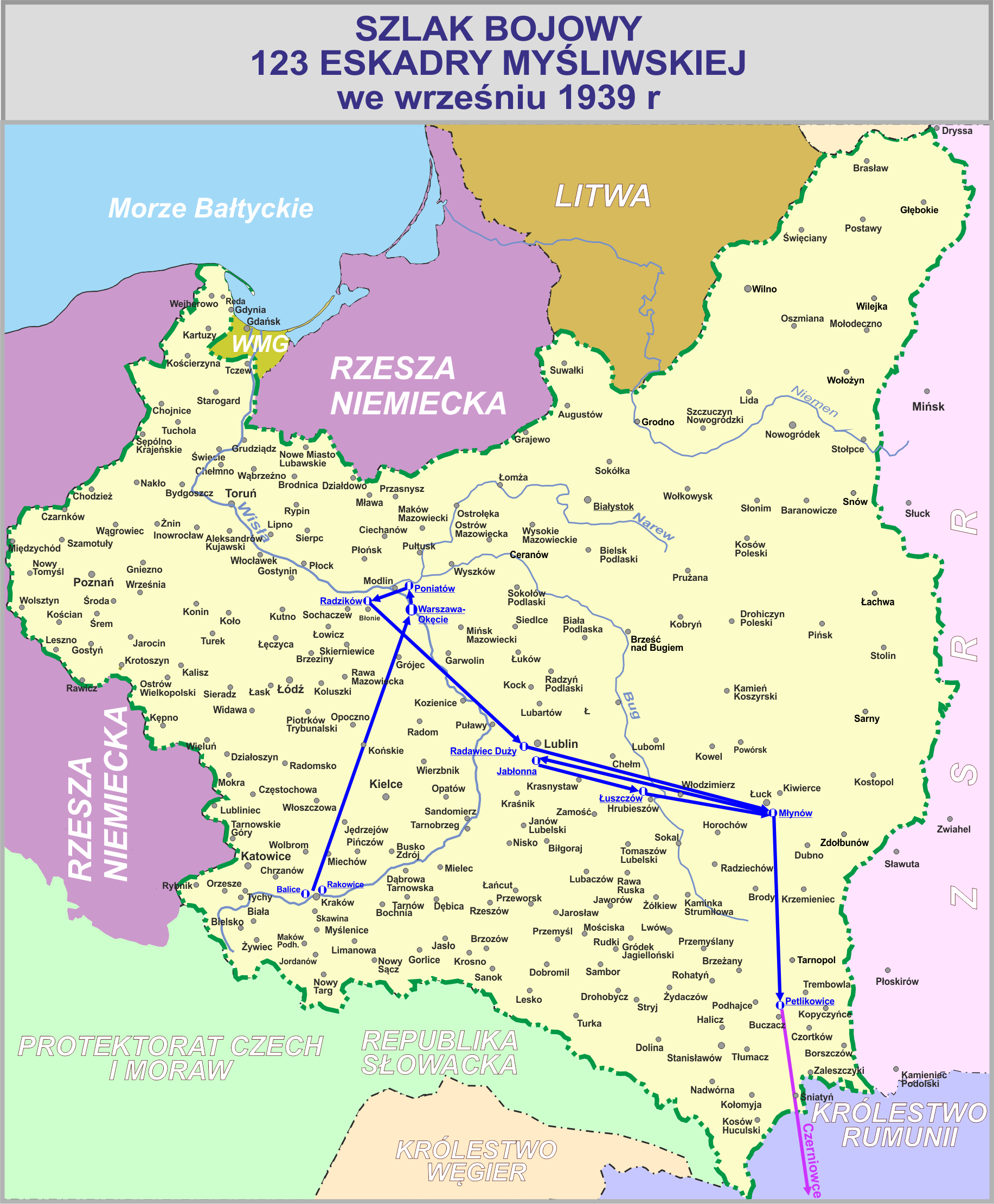

== History ==
In September 1939 the 123rd Fighter Escadrille was part of the Pursuit Brigade. Some reports say that the 123rd Escadrille was a Kraków Army "Eskadra" (Flight) attached to the Brygada Poscigowa for the defence of Warsaw in 1939. Its 120 series Flight number indicates that claim. Reference: "Ciel de Gloire" website.

== Crew and equipment ==
On 1 September 1939 the escadrille had 10 PZL P.7a airplanes.

The air crew consisted of: commanding officer kpt. pil. Mieczysław Leonard Olszewski his deputy ppor. pil. Erwin Kawnik and 11 other pilots:

1. ppor. Stanisław Chałupa
2. ppor. Jerzy Czerniak
3. ppor. Feliks Szyszka
4. pchor. Władysław Bożek
5. pchor. Stanisław Czternastek
6. pchor. Antoni Danek
7. pchor. Tadeusz Kratke
8. kpr. Henryk Flame
9. kpr. Stanisław Widlarz
10. st. szer. Eugeniusz Nowakiewicz
11. st. szer. Stanisław Zięba

== See also ==
- Polish Air Force order of battle in 1939
