= 2nd Fighter Division (Germany) =

2nd Fighter Division (German: 2. Jagd-Division) was one of the primary divisions of the German Luftwaffe in World War II. It was formed 1 May 1942 in Stade The Division was disbanded on 8 May 1945. The Division was subordinated to XII. Fliegerkorps (May 1942 – September 1943), I. Jagdkorps (September 1943 – January 1945) and IX (J) Fliegerkorps (January 1945 – May 1945).

== Commanding officers ==
- Generalleutnant Walter Schwabedissen, 1 May 1942 – 30 September 1943
- Generalmajor Max Ibel, 1 October 1943 – 1 February 1945
- Oberst Gustav Rödel, 1 February 1945 – May 1945

== Subordinated units ==
- Lw.Sanitäts-Abt./2. Jagddivision (1 May 1942 – 8 May 1945)
- Jagdfliegerführer 2 (1 December 1943 – 31 December 1944)
- Jagdabschnittsführer Dänemark (1 September 1943 – 8 May 1945)
- Jagdfliegerführer Deutsche Bucht (1 September 1943 – 31 December 1943)
- Luftnachrichten-Regiment 202 (1 May 1942 – 8 May 1945)
- Luftnachrichten-Regiment 212 (1 May 1942 – 8 May 1945)
- Luftnachrichten-Regiment 222 (1 May 1942 – 8 May 1945)
- Luftnachrichten-Regiment 232 (1 May 1942 – 8 May 1945)

== See also ==
- Luftwaffe Organisation
