= 1st Fighter Corps =

WW2 German Luftwaffe formation

I. Jagdkorps German 1st Fighter Corps
- Active: 15 September 1943 – 26 January 1945
- Country: Nazi Germany
- Branch: Luftwaffe
- Size: Corps

Commanders
- Notable commanders: Generalleutnant Joseph Schmid

I. Jagdkorps (I. JK) (Note: For more details see Luftwaffe Organization) (1st Fighter Corps) was formed 15 September 1943 in Zeist from the XII. Fliegerkorps and the Luftwaffenbefehlshaber Mitte, and later subordinated to the Luftflotte Reich. The Stab relocated to Brunswick-Querum in March 1944 and to Treuenbrietzen in October 1944. The unit was disbanded on 26 January 1945 and its obligations were taken over by IX.(J) Fliegerkorps.

== Role ==
I. Jagdkorps controlled the units based in Germany for the Defence of the Reich campaign. The Corps was an operational command. Its powers were exercised in supervision and planning and less in actual control during combat missions. The Corps attempted to control the deployment of units in its area. Its functions included running analysis for all divisions under its command with the intent of figuring out enemy intentions. This was attempted by studying the weather forecasts, listening in on enemy radio transmissions and monitoring the radar services. It received the divisions readiness reports and dictated broad lines of strategic fighter employment.

The two Jagdkorps, I. JK and II. JK, were responsible for all day fighter forces after the formation of Luftflotte Reich. However, the forces in southern Germany and Austria were subordinated to Fliegerdivision 7. In frustration, its commanding officer Joseph Schmid, wrote to the Reichsluftfahrtministerium (RLM – Reich Air Ministry) to increase his own powerbase and role of I.JK in the defence of Germany. On 24 January 1944 Schmid argued for one central agency should be given the responsibility of intelligence. All other agencies (radio, radar and ground observer) should report to this single agency and should be put under its command. Schmid also added that a central commanding unit should be set up to direct day and night fighter defences. After the war Schmid complained that this was not done until 31 March 1944, and that he had officially requested this on 11 December 1943.

== Operational history ==
=== Combat operations in 1943 ===
Among the thousands of aerial engagements and aerial battles over Europe in 1943, 1944 and 1945, I. JK fought several notable actions.

On 9 October 1943 the United States Army Air Force Eighth Air Force bombed the Focke-Wulf plant at Marienburg inflicting much damage. Although the Germans failed to intercept them on the way to the target, the staff of I. JK guessed correctly the return route of the bomber stream. Every day and night fighter made contact and, aided by perfect weather, shot down 28 bombers and damaged two so badly they were scrapped. German losses were limited. The Messerschmitt Bf 109s and Focke-Wulf Fw 190s had not intercepted, but all the day and night fighter forces equipped with Messerschmitt Bf 110s did, and their units lost only 10 fighters, with 11 aircrew killed in action or missing in action and one wounded in action.

=== Combat operations in 1944 ===
On 11 January 1944 the Eighth Air Force again was engaged by I.JK's tactical units. I. JK contributed 289 sorties, 207 with enemy contact. USAAF fighter units reported heavy resistance. The attacks of its fighter shot down 60 USAAF bombers and five more were scrapped. USAAF fighters, 592 in number, claimed 31 German fighters destroyed, 12 probable and 16 damaged for a loss of five destroyed three beyond repair and six damaged. Losses of German fighters were severe. 53 German fighters were destroyed and 31 damaged. 38 aircrew were killed and 22 wounded.

Schmid reported that all fighter units had failed to master the successful head on attack properly in a report on 24 January 1944. Schmid complained that reinforcements had not been received despite a request in December 1943. Schmid stated that Wilde Sau units had suffered high losses which damaged combat effectiveness of the day fighter force. The replacements of lost fighters were satisfactory for the moment. The striking power of I. JK was better than in late 1943, according to Schimd. Schmid reported the confidence that the 11 January interception had given the fighter units had improved morale, although he warned, "the tactical and numerical superiority of the American fighter units had not been demonstrated fully".

Schmid confirmed that the average strength for January was 400 single-engine fighters, 80 twin-engine fighters and 100 night fighters for day use. I. JK had committed 2,306 sorties to the defence and lost 122 aircraft, or 5.3 percent of the force. The USAAF had flown 7,158 sorties and lost 179 aircraft, or 2.5 percent. Schmid's requests for reinforcements were denied.

On 4 February 1944 the Eighth Air Force bombed Wilhelmshaven and Emden. German controllers failed to intercept or locate the stream. Only I. and II.Jagdgeschwader 26 made contact, losing four Fw 190s, one pilot killed and one wounded for five bombers. Schmid was blamed and summoned to Berlin. Schmid blamed Fliegerdivision 7.

On 23 February 1944 Schmid reorganized his forces in I. JK to contain:

- Jagddivision 1
  - Jagdgeschwader 3
  - Jagdgeschwader 300
  - Zerstörergeschwader 26
  - Jagdgeschwader 302
- Jagddivision 2
  - Jagdgeschwader 54
- Jagddivision 3
  - Jagdgeschwader 1
  - I./Jagdgeschwader 300

During Big Week – part of the Allied strategy to force the Luftwaffe to commit aircraft it could not afford to lose – on 24 February 1944, I. JK and II. JK intercepted the Eighth Air Force and between them shot down 33 B-24 Liberators plus another damaged. Another 16 B-17 Flying Fortresses and one damaged were lost along with 10 USAAF fighters 11.3 percent of the force. For this exchange the Jagdkorps lost 46 aircraft, 9.6 percent of the forces committed. It also lost 31 aircrew killed and 14 wounded.

On 25 February 1944, I. JK was duped by a diversionary raid into withholding Jagdgeschwader 11 on standby in order to counter a suspected target in eastern Germany. Before the mistake was realised, the B-24s of the USAAF turned back and it was too late to get JG 11 involved in the fighting. The defensive effort of the Fliegerdivision 7 and I. JK hampered the interception. The days score was 31 USAAF heavy bombers destroyed and three damaged plus three USAAF fighters destroyed and two damaged. The German casualties, including I. JK stood at 48 fighters, 19 killed and 20 wounded.

At the end of February 1944, Schimd stated in I Jagdkorps War Diary that the raids of Big Week had disrupted the flow of aircraft plants to the extent that supply to their defences were impossible. Schmid stated that the multiple raids on the same day effectively dissipated the air defences. Schmid complained decentralized command was impossible, as units were subject to different division, air fleet or Korps headquarters. Hermann Göring gave I. JK the responsibility of defending the coastal, Berlin and central areas of Germany. Schmid complained his forces were inadequate to meet this challenged. Schmid also stated that technically and numerically American fighter units were superior to the RLV units. Schmid described it as a hapless battle for which victory was unlikely. Schmid recorded that the average daily strength was 350 single-engine fighters, 100 twin-engine fighters, and 50 night fighters available for day use. February sorties by I. JK equalled 2,861 in which they lost 299 aircraft or 10.3 percent. The USSAF flew 10,452 sorties and lost just 310 aircraft, 2.5 percent.

On 6 March 1944 the Eighth Air Force struck Berlin. I. JK committed the cream of their units to the battle. It was the largest concentrated attack in the history of the RLV, and the Defence of the Reich Campaign. Some 20 bombers were shot down by 12:25 hours. Along with other Korps and Flieger and Jagddisivions, the USAAF Eighth Air Force lost 69 bombers and a further six damaged – its highest of the war. Another 11 USAAF fighters were shot down and three damaged. The bomber loss rate was 10.2 percent of the force. The RLV lost 64 fighters, eight aircrew killed, 36 missing and 23 wounded. Nearly all the missing were dead. The loss rate of aircraft was 19.2 percent of the force.

The USAAF returned on 9 March to Berlin. Schmid moved his Headquarters from Zeist, Netherlands to Brunswick, reflecting I. JK abandonment of forward defence. I. JK and other Luftwaffe units did not respond. The dwindling industrial value of Berlin's shattered industry and the fact the propaganda value of defending their capital had been lost, the Luftwaffe decided not to risk its shrinking fighter force further.

The 3rd Bomb Division of the USAAF Eighth Air Force was intercepted by elements of I. JK which committed Fliegerdivisions 1, 2 and 3 on its way to Brunswick and Munster. Strong head winds meant it flew ahead of schedule and missed its escort. It lost 16 B-17s and one damaged to Jagdgeschwader 3.

Overall 28 bombers were destroyed and one damaged plus four USAAF fighters and one damaged was achieved. The RLV, among it I. JK, lost 31 fighters with six killed, 12 missing and six wounded. Schmid claimed that on 1 April 1944, the Jagddivision 7 and Jafu Ostmark was now placed under the command of I. JK and Schmid had his way, the defence was now under a single command in western and central Germany. Schmid calculated that I Jagdkorps flew 2,226 sorties in March 1944 and lost 240 aircraft, or 10.9 percent. The USAAF flew 16,612 missions and lost 302 aircraft or 1.8 percent.

On 2 April the Fifteenth Air Force flew missions against Steyr, Austria which housed aircraft assembly plants and ball-bearings factories. All the RLV units responded. Some 312 single engine German fighters made an interception plus another 64 Messerschmitt Bf 110s. The 110s claimed five B-17s, three B-24s and one P-38 for eight losses, mostly to the 14th Fighter Group. Other units, such as Jagddivision 7 claimed 11 B-17s and 31 B-24s, plus three P-38s and one P-47 (all claims were not confirmed) for seven Bf 109s. Actual US losses were eight B-17s and 20 B-24s. No P-47s or P-38s were lost. Some I. JK fighters were involved in the battles.

On 8 April 1944 the Eighth Air Force attacked aviation industry targets around Brunswick. The Germans could not match the estimated 600 USAAF fighters dispatched to cover the bombers. JD 1, 2 and 3 were ordered to engage. Only the 2d Bomb Wing reached Brunswick. 250 Fw 190s and Bf 109s attacked the unescorted sections of B-24s. The fighters of JG 1 and JG 11 made head on attacks. Attacking the bombers furthest away from the P-51 escort, the Fw 190s made repeated passes knowing the P-51s above would not dive through the bombers to engage. On one pass, the German fighters mistakenly turned into the side of the Mustangs, climbing, after making an attack. The 357th Fighter Group shot down six. Among the casualties was Staffelkaptan Oberleutnant Josef Zwernemann. He had managed to claim a P-51 shot down, but in turn was shot down, but bailed out. Several of his staffel say they saw a P-51 in red and yellow markings shoot him in his parachute.

Further east, over the north sea, B-24s from the 14th Combat Wing were heading to Brunswick, planning to head further east and approach the city from its eastern side to avoid spending much time over the target. One of the four formations turned back, but a shadowing Me 410 Fuhlungshalter reported the other three formations position. 1 D's JG 3 attacked supported by 14 Sturmstaffel 1 Fw 190 heavy fighters. Some 11 B-24s were shot down before P-51s were quickly on the scene. The day was costly for both sides. 30 B-24s were destroyed and two damaged. Four B-17s were lost to flak and 23 USAAF fighters were lost and two damaged. Most fighter losses were caused by flak. German casualties are not clear, but at least 40 pilots were dead and 70 fighters lost. I. JK war diary indicated most of the 72 fighters claimed lost in were a result of strafing attacks. Another 45 were stated as damaged.

On 14 May 1944, the I Fighter Corps consisted of 1st Fighter Division in Döberiz (with Jagdführer Schlesien in Cosel and Jagdführer Ostpreußen in Insterburg), 2nd Fighter Division in Stade (with Jagdabschnittsführer Dänemark in Grove), 3rd Fighter Division (with Jagdabschnittsführer Mittelrhein) and 7th Fighter Division (with Jagdführer Ostmark in Vienna and Jagdabschnittsführer Ungarn in Budapest).

== Commanding officers ==
- Generalleutnant Joseph Schmid, 15 September 1943 – 30 November 1944
- Generalleutnant Joachim-Friedrich Huth, 30 November 1944 – 26 January 1945

== Bibliography ==
- Caldwell, Donald; Muller Richard. (2007). The Luftwaffe Over Germany: Defense of the Reich. Greenhill books. ISBN 978-1-85367-712-0.
- Isby, David C. (1998). The Luftwaffe Fighter Force—The View from the Cockpit. London: Greenhill Books. ISBN 978-1-85367-327-6.
