= Pursuit Brigade =

- Brygada Pościgowa
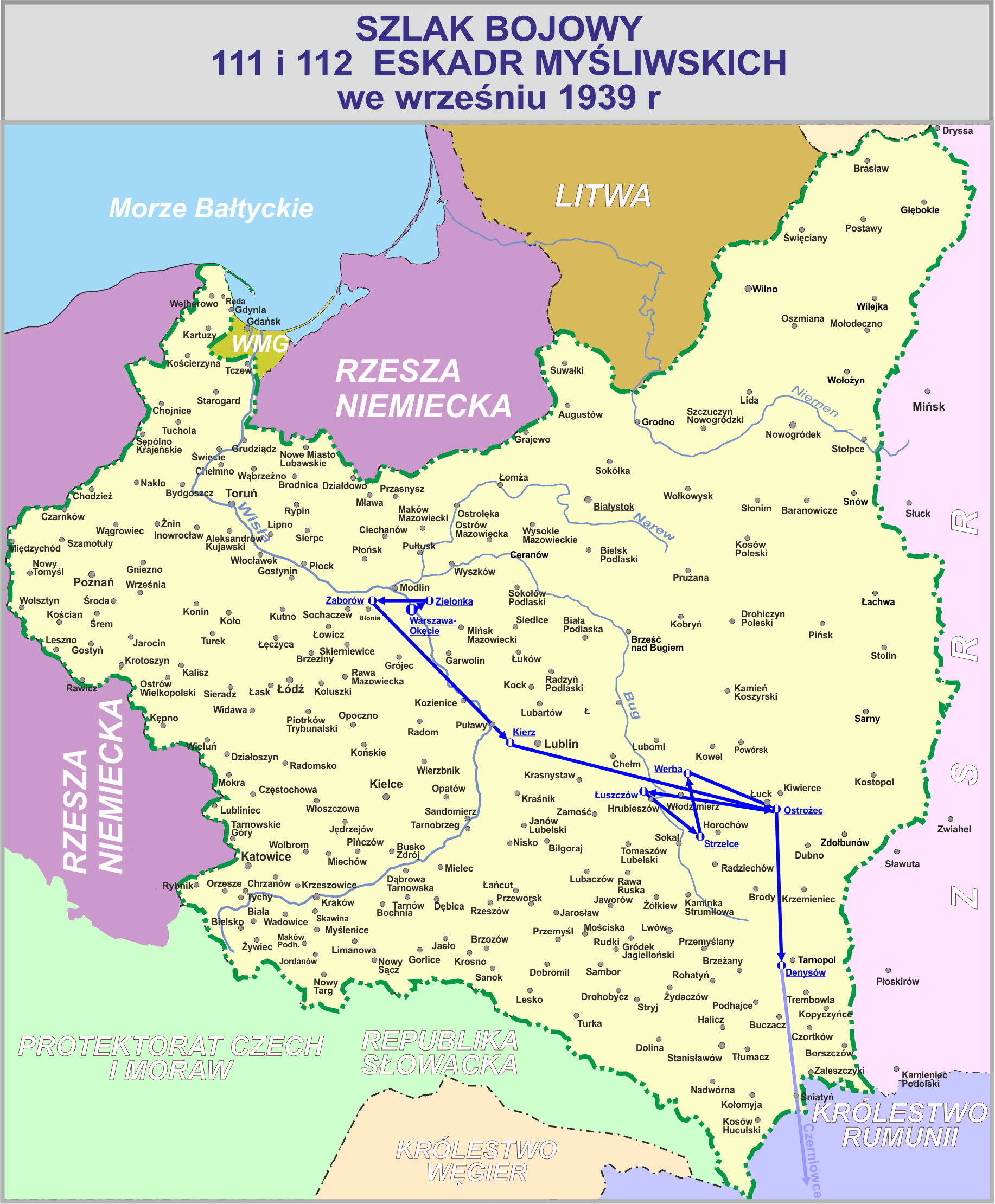
- Polish Pursuit Brigade in 1939
- Active: 1939
- Country: Poland
- Allegiance: Polish Air Force
- Branch: Air Force
- Type: Fighter Squadron
- Role: Air Defense
- Size: 2 Squadrons
- Equipment: PZL P.11, PZL P.7
- Engagements: Polish Defensive War (1939)

Commanders
- Notable commanders: [List of commanders]

The Pursuit Brigade (Polish: Brygada Pościgowa) was a Polish World War II unit of the Polish Air Force. It took part in the Polish Defensive War of 1939 as the main aerial reserve of the commander in chief and was used for air cover of the Polish capital of Warsaw. It was similar in organization to the Bomber Brigade. It was composed of two squadrons, each in turn composed of a number of escadrilles.

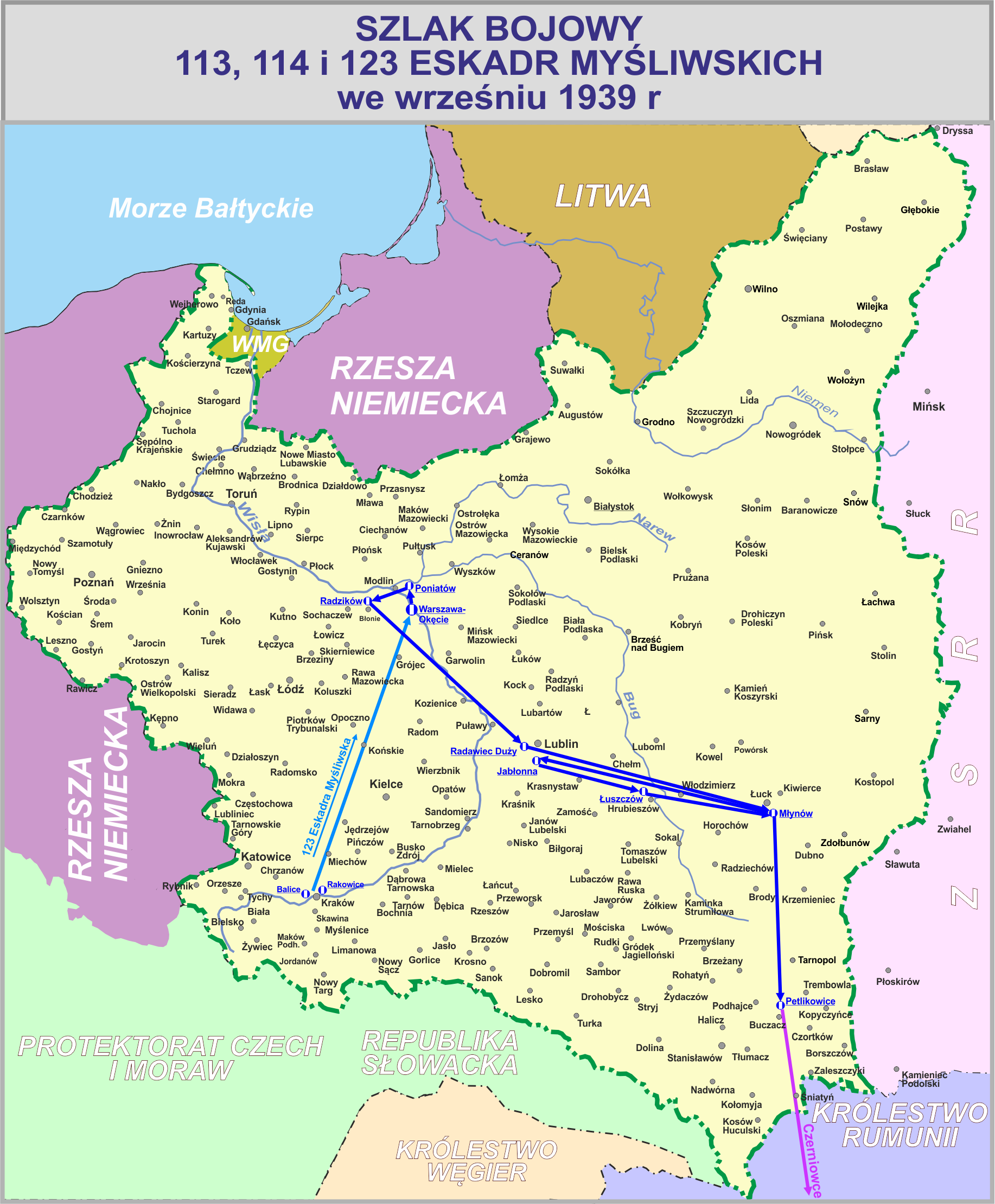

- Polish III/1 Fighter Squadron (III/1. Dywizjon Myśliwski)
  - Polish 111th Fighter Escadrille (111 Eskadra Myśliwska)
  - Polish 112th Fighter Escadrille (112 Eskadra Myśliwska)
- Polish IV/1 Fighter Squadron (IV/1 Dywizjon Myśliwski)
  - Polish 113th Fighter Escadrille (113 Eskadra Myśliwska)
  - Polish 114th Fighter Escadrille (114 Eskadra Myśliwska)
  - Polish 123rd Fighter Escadrille (123 Eskadra Myśliwska)

By 1 September Pursuit Brigade had 43 PZL P.11 and 10 PZL P.7 fighters (Zaloga, p. 34).

It was the most successful unit of the Polish Air Force during the Defensive War. On September 1, while defending Warsaw, it shot down 16 German planes, losing 10 of its own fighters. Over the first six days of the war, it is credited with shooting down 42 German airplanes. By that time, however, it had lost 38 of its 54 fighters. On 6 September, it was transferred from the Warsaw theatre to Lublin (Zaloga, pp. 51–52).
