= Sidi Abdel Rahman =

Sidi Abdel Rahman سيدي عبدالرحمن
- Village
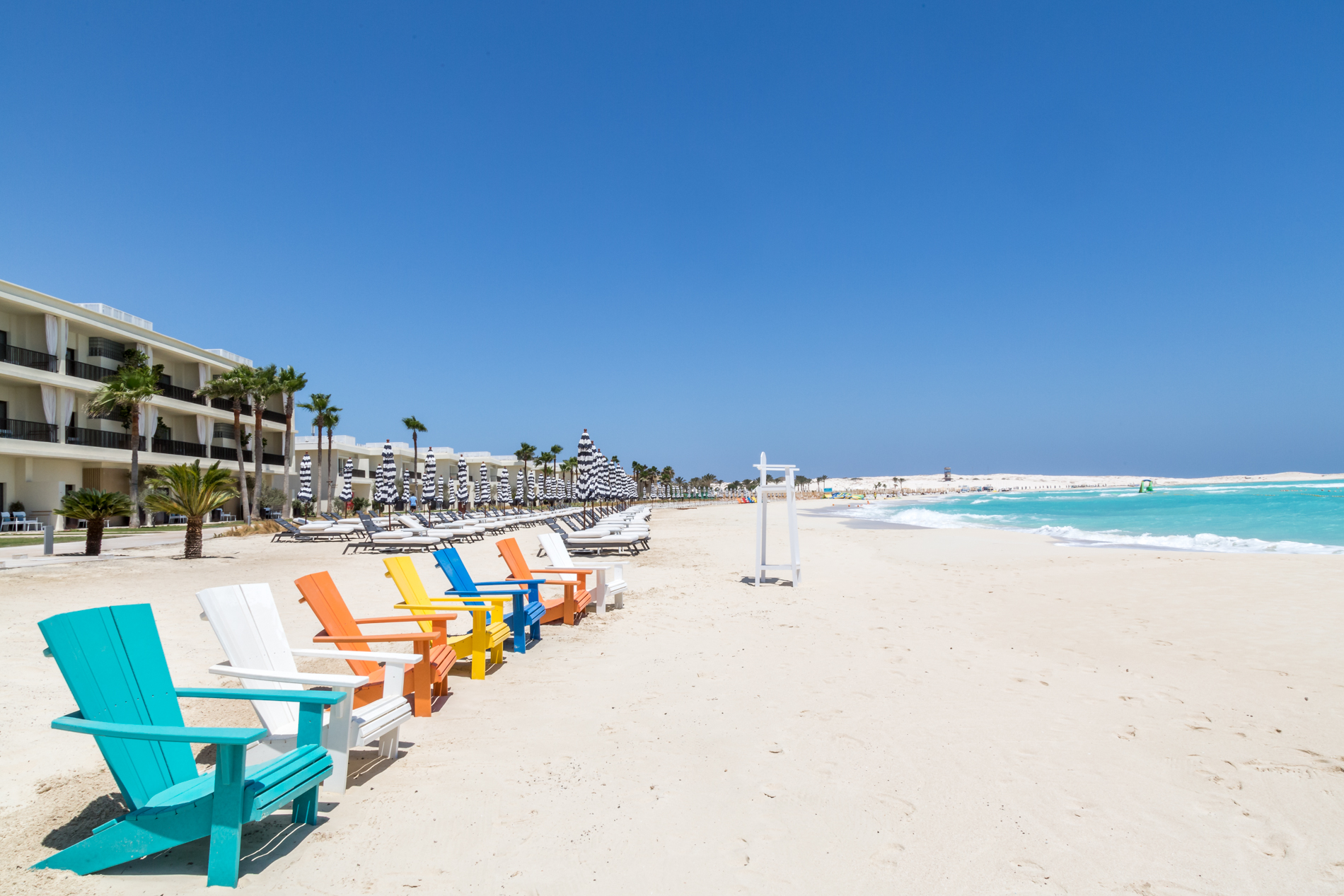
- Al Alamein Hotel, Sidi Abd El Rahman is located in El Alamein

- Location in Egypt
- Coordinates: 30°58′N 28°44′E
- Country: Egypt
- Governorate: Matruh
- Time zone: UTC+2 (EET)
  - Summer (DST): UTC+3 (EEST)

Sidi Abdel Rahman (Arabic: سيدي عبدالرحمن) is a village on the coast of the Mediterranean Sea in Egypt.

== Overview ==
Sidi Abdel Rahman is located in the Egyptian Western Desert on a bay of the Mediterranean Sea, and has a know resort.

There are a large number of unexploded landmines, dating from World War II in the area that have caused human casualties and hindered development in the area over the years.

Sidi Abdel Rahman is near the site of the famous 1942 Battle of El Alamein of World War II. Mausoleums and a cemetery for the Allies can be found nearby, with at least ninety-nine soldiers laid to rest there. The unmarked remains of thousands of German soldiers can also be found in the cemetery. On September 30, 1942, Luftwaffe ace Hans-Joachim Marseille, who claimed an unrivaled total of 158 aircraft destroyed against the Allies, was killed near the settlement. The site is marked with a pyramid about 10km south of the village.

Sidi Abdel Rahman was just a "modest local resort". The Gulf of Sidi Abdel Rahman on the Mediterranean including the Al Alamein Hotel were auctioned off by the Egyptian General Company for Tourism and Hotels (EGOTH) in 2006, and Emaar Egypt, a subsidiary of Emaar Dubai won the rights to develop the area. The revenue received from the sale was to be used for upgrading historical Egyptian hotels, according to the Minister of Investment Mahmoud Mohieldin involved in the deal.

The developer, with deep pockets, who purchased Sidi Abdel Rahman proposed to develop a year-round city at a hefty cost of 1.74 billion. As promised during the auction bidding, Emaar immediately built a large resort called Marassi Resort and it is 24 km (15 mi) from Al Alamain International Airport. DJ Bob Sinclar performed in August, 2008 at Marassi. Emaar Egypt's initial public offering in Egypt in 2015 was the largest IPO in Egypt, since 2007.
