= Homuth =

Homuth is a surname with German origin. The nickname originates from Middle High German, combining 'hōch' meaning 'high' and 'muot' meaning 'mind' or 'spirit', describing either a person of noble character or one perceived as arrogant.

Popular people with this surname include:

- Gerhard Homuth, (1914 – 1943), a World War II Luftwaffe fighter ace.
- Katherine Homuth, a Canadian businesswoman, author, and inventor.
- Sean Homuth, a Canadian businessman
- Don Homuth, Former North Dakota State Senator, Vietnam War Veteran, and author
- Jim Homuth, famed NHL hockey mask maker/inventor
