= Karl-Heinz Bendert =

German World War II fighter pilot (1914–1983)

- Born: 9 September 1914; Schwiebus, Province of Brandenburg
- Died: 16 July 1983 (aged 68); Oldenburg
- Military career
- Allegiance: Nazi Germany
- Branch: Luftwaffe
- Service years: 1937–1945
- Rank: Oberleutnant (first lieutenant)
- Units: JG 27, JG 104
- Commands: 5./JG 27, 2./JG 104
- Conflicts: See battles World War II: Battle of France; Battle of Britain; North African Campaign; First Battle of El Alamein; Second Battle of El Alamein; Defense of the Reich; second Schweinfurt raid

Karl-Heinz Bendert (9 September 1914 – 16 July 1983) was a German Luftwaffe ace and recipient of the Knight's Cross of the Iron Cross during World War II. Bendert claimed 55 victories in 610 combat missions. During his time with Jagdgeschwader 27 (JG 27—27th Fighter Wing) in the North African Campaign, he was involved in scandal with falsifying claims; his victories were mostly false because he would claim to have shot down enemy aircraft during missions in which other squadron members did shoot down aircraft to save face. Despite this, he was given credit for the victories.

== Early life and career ==
Bendert was born on 9 September 1914 in Schwiebus, present-day Świebodzin in western Poland, at the time in the Province of Brandenburg within the German Empire. In 1937, he volunteered for military service in the Luftwaffe. Following completion of flight and fighter pilot training, (Note: Flight training in the Luftwaffe progressed through the levels A1, A2 and B1, B2, referred to as A/B flight training. A training included theoretical and practical training in aerobatics, navigation, long-distance flights and dead-stick landings. The B courses included high-altitude flights, instrument flights, night landings and training to handle the aircraft in difficult situations.) Bendert was posted to 4. Staffel (4th squadron) of Jagdgeschwader 27 (JG 27—27th Fighter Wing) in January 1940.

At the time, the Staffel was commanded by Oberleutnant Hermann Hollweg and subordinated to the newly created II. Gruppe (2nd group) of JG 27 headed by Hauptmann Erich von Selle. The Gruppe had been formed at the airfield in Magdeburg-Ost (Fliegerhorst Magdeburg-Ost). Command of II. Gruppe was transferred to Hauptmann Werner Anders on 6 February. The Gruppe was equipped with Messerschmitt Bf 109 E-1 and E-3 variant. For the first weeks, the Gruppe conducted various flight exercises before on 10 February they were ordered to move to Döberitz. There, the unit was tasked with providing fighter protection for Berlin. On 19 April, II. Gruppe began its transfer to the west, with 4. Staffel moving to Essen-Mühlheim. For the upcoming Battle of France, II. Gruppe was placed under the control of the Stab (headquarters unit) of Jagdgeschwader 51 (JG 51—51st Fighter Wing) under command of Oberst Theo Osterkamp. The Gruppe was briefly ordered to return to Döberitz on 24 April before returning west again on 3 May.

== World War II ==
World War II in Europe had begun on Friday 1 September 1939 when German forces invaded Poland. During the campaign against France Fall Gelb (Case Yellow), II. Gruppe, as a subordinated unit to JG 51 was controlled by Jagdfliegerführer 2, Oberst Kurt-Bertram von Döring, and was deployed on the right flank of Luftflotte 2 (Air Fleet 2), supporting the attack of Army Group B against the Netherlands. On 10 May, the day the Wehrmacht launched the attack, 4. Staffel was located in Wesel and flew missions to Rotterdam.

JG 27 insignia

Bendert claimed his first aerial victory on 12 May over a Bristol Blenheim bomber of the Royal Air Force (RAF). That day, 4. Staffel flew a combat air patrol and encountered a flight of Blenheim bombers north of Rotterdam. In this encounter, Luftwaffe pilots claimed five bombers shot down without loss of their own. On 8 June, he was awarded the Iron Cross 2nd Class (Eisernes Kreuz zweiter Klasse). The following day, II. Gruppe supported Army Group A in the combat area of the Aisne and Compiègne. Engaging a formation of Morane-Saulnier M.S.406 fighters, Bendert claimed one of the fighters shot down. For this, he was awarded the Iron Cross 1st Class (Eisernes Kreuz erster Klasse). Following the Armistice of 22 June 1940, II. Gruppe was sent to Wunstorf near Hanover for a period of rest and replenishment. On 8 July, the Gruppe began its relocation west again, with 4. Staffel arriving in Leeuwarden on 11 July. Here, the Gruppe was tasked with patrolling the Dutch coast until 5 August when they received orders to relocate to an airfield at Crépon, located northwest of Caen on the English Channel.

On 11 August, Bendert claimed his first aerial victory during the Battle of Britain. That day, II. Gruppe had moved to an airfield at Sainte-Mère-Église before they took off at 11:40 on fighter escort mission for Junkers Ju 88 bombers from Kampfgeschwader 54 (KG 54—54th Bomber Wing) heading to the Isle of Portland. Over Weymouth Bay, the Luftwaffe attack force was intercepted by RAF fighters. In this aerial battle, Bendert claimed a misidentified Curtiss P-36 Hawk fighter shot down. On 3 September, II. Gruppe was tasked with clearing the airspace of RAF fighters over Southend-on-Sea for Dornier Do 17 bombers from Kampfgeschwader 2 (KG 2—2nd Bomber Wing) attacking North Weald Airfield. The Gruppe encountered RAF fighters over the Thames Estuary resulting in aerial combat. In this engagement, Bendert claimed two Supermarine Spitfire fighters shot down. On 6 September, Bendert claimed his sixth in total and last aerial victory of the Battle of Britain when he shot down a Spitfire fighter near Tonbridge. The next day, 4. Staffel was placed under the command of Staffelkapitän (squadron leader) Oberleutnant Gustav Rödel.

In the first half of 1941, II. Gruppe was participated in German invasion of Greece. The Gruppe, as with most of the Luftwaffe, was then withdrawn for the imminent invasion of the Soviet Union for a brief 9-day participation in Operation Barbarossa.

=== North Africa ===
Following the withdrawal from the Eastern Front, II. Gruppe arrived in Döberitz on 24 July 1941. The entire personnel then went on vacation, returning to Döberitz on 18 August. Over the next three weeks, the Gruppe converted to the Bf 109 F-4 fighter. Relocation to the North African Theater began on 7 September, with 4. Staffel transferring south on 16 September and was based at an airfield in Ain el Gazala. There, II. Gruppe joined I. Gruppe of JG 27 which was already based in North Africa. On 26 September, II. Gruppe flew its first combat missions in North Africa, a combat air patrol to Sollum.

In North Africa, Bendert flew in the Schwarm made up of Oberleutnant Ferdinand Vögl, the commander of 4. Staffel, Oberfeldwebel Franz Stigler, Oberfeldwebel Erwin Sawallisch and Bendert. At the time, most of the aerial victories claimed by II. Gruppe were allegedly achieved by pilots of 4. Staffel, of which 63 out 66 claims were attributed to these four pilots alone. In comparison, the claims filed by Vögl, Stigler, Sawallisch and Bendert far exceeded the number of aerial victories claimed by other units of JG 27 and raised significant doubt within the Luftwaffe. This Schwarm of JG 27 was prevented from flying together after fellow pilot Hans-Arnold Stahlschmidt reported that he saw them shooting into the dunes of the desert during a mission in which they claimed 12 aerial victories.

Following his 40th aerial victory claimed, Bendert was awarded the Honor Goblet of the Luftwaffe (Ehrenpokal der Luftwaffe) on 18 September 1942 and the German Cross in Gold (Deutsches Kreuz in Gold) on 15 October for 42 aerial victories claimed.

=== Instructor and squadron leader ===
In November 1942, Bendert was posted to 2. Staffel of Ergänzungs-Jagdgruppe Süd, a supplementary training unit for fighter pilots based at Salon-de-Provence, as an instructor. Serving in this capacity, he was awarded the Knight's Cross of the Iron Cross (Ritterkreuz des Eisernes Kreuzes) on 30 December 1942 for his 42 aerial victories claimed while serving with JG 27. During this tenure as an instructor, Bendert was also promoted to Leutnant (second lieutenant) and later to Oberleutnant (first lieutenant). In October 1943, he was posted to the Gruppenstab of II. Gruppe of JG 27. In October 1943, II. Gruppe was under the command of Major Werner Schröer and based at Saint-Dizier Airfield and fighting in defense of the Reich. On 14 October during the second Schweinfurt raid at 13:28, II. Gruppe was scrambled at Saint-Dizier and intercepted approximately 150 bombers without escorting fighter protection shortly after 14:00 over the Palatinate. During this aerial battle, Luftwaffe pilots of II. Gruppe claimed nine bombers shot down, including two Boeing B-17 Flying Fortress heavy bombers, one near Kirn and the second near Avricourt, by Bendert, his first claims since his return to JG 27. On 18 November, the Gruppe relocated to Wiesbaden-Erbenheim Airfield.

Combat box of a 12-plane B-17 squadron. Three such boxes completed a 36-plane group box.: 1. Lead Element; 2. High Element; 3. Low Element; 4. Low Low Element

On 1 December 1943, he was then appointed Staffelkapitän of 5. Staffel of JG 27. He succeeded Oberleutnant Herbert Schramm who was killed in action. On 11 December, the United States Army Air Forces (USAAF) VIII Bomber Command, later renamed to Eighth Air Force, attacked Emden with 538 heavy bombers, escorted by 388 fighter aircraft. II. Gruppe intercepted a B-17 formation at 12:50 west of Groningen. During this encounter, Bendert claimed an Herausschuss (separation shot)—a severely damaged heavy bomber forced to separate from its combat box which was counted as an aerial victory—at 13:25 east of Groningen. On 11 January 1944, VIII Bomber Command targeted German aircraft production in central Germany, attacking the cities Halberstadt, Magdeburg, Oschersleben and Braunschweig. In total, the USAAF dispatched 663 heavy bombers, escorted by 592 fighter aircraft. The attack however did not proceed as planned and the bombers of the 2nd and 3rd Bombardment Division were ordered to return prior to reaching the target area and bombed various "targets of opportunity" in the area of Osnabrück, Bielefeld, Herford, Meppen and Lingen. In consequence of this order, the USAAF fighter protection was dispersed. II. Gruppe of JG 27 was scrambled at 11:47 and vectored to a formation of Consolidated B-24 Liberator bombers near Assen. In this encounter, II. Gruppe pilots claimed seven aerial victories and two Herausschüsse. Bendert was credited with the destruction of a B-24 bomber and an escorting Republic P-47 Thunderbolt fighter.

On 8 March, the Eighth Air Force attacked the Berlin area, destroying the VKF ball-bearing plant at Erkner. II. Gruppe was scrambled at 12:17 at Wiesbaden-Erbenheim Airfield and joined up with II. Gruppe of Jagdgeschwader 53 (JG 53—53rd Fighter Wing) near Magdeburg where they engaged in aerial combat with a B-17 formation. II. Gruppe of JG 27 pilots claimed three B-17 bombers destroyed for the loss of two of their own. The remaining aircraft then returned to Wiesbaden-Erbenheim Airfield where they were made ready for a second mission. At 15:05, five Bf 109 fighters from II. Gruppe of JG 27 took off and joined up again with a flight from JG 53. The Luftwaffe formation intercepted the returning B-17 bombers west of Coburg. That day, Bendert claimed two B-17 bombers shot down, one on the first mission and another on the second.

On 25 April 1944, Bendert was transferred to Jagdgeschwader 104 (JG 104—104th Fighter Wing) where he was given command of 2. Staffel. Command of 5. Staffel of JG 27 was passed to Hauptmann Eberhard Bock.

== Later life ==
Bendert died on 16 July 1983 at the age of 68 in Oldenburg, West Germany.

== Summary of career ==
=== Aerial victory claims ===
According to Obermaier, Bendert was credited with 55 aerial victories claimed in 610 combat mission over the Western Front and North Africa, including ten four-engined heavy bombers. Ring and Girbig list him with 54 aerial victories, including nine heavy bombers. Mathews and Foreman, authors of Luftwaffe Aces — Biographies and Victory Claims, researched the German Federal Archives and found records for 44 aerial victory claims, plus eight further unconfirmed claims. All of his aerial victories were claimed over the Western Allies on the Western Front or in North Africa and includes two four-engined heavy bombers.

Chronicle of aerial victories
This and the ♠ (Ace of spades) indicates those aerial victories which made Bendert an "ace-in-a-day", a term which designates a fighter pilot who has shot down five or more airplanes in a single day. This and the – (dash) indicates unconfirmed aerial victory claims for which Bendert did not receive credit. This along with the * (asterisk) indicates an Herausschuss (separation shot)—a severely damaged heavy bomber forced to separate from his combat box which was counted as an aerial victory. This and the ? (question mark) indicates information discrepancies listed by Prien, Stemmer, Rodeike, Bock, Mathews and Foreman.
Claim	Date	Time	Type	Location	Unit	Claim	Date	Time	Type	Location	Unit
– Claims with II. Gruppe of Jagdgeschwader 27 – Battle of France — 10 May – 25 June 1940
1	12 May 1940	08:54	Blenheim	north of Rotterdam	4./JG 27	2	9 June 1940	13:40	M.S.406	Fort de Villers	4./JG 27
– Claims with II. Gruppe of Jagdgeschwader 27 – At the Channel and over England — 26 June – 5 November 1940
3	11 August 1940	11:50	Curtiss?? (Note: According to Mathews and Foreman claimed as a Supermarine Spitfire.)	west of Portland	4./JG 27	5	3 September 1940	11:45? (Note: According to Mathews and Foreman claimed at 15:45.)	Spitfire	Rochester	4./JG 27
4? (Note: According to Mathews and Foreman this claim is unconfirmed.)	3 September 1940	11:40? (Note: According to Mathews and Foreman claimed at 15:40.)	Spitfire	Thames Estuary	4./JG 27	6	6 September 1940	10:10	Spitfire	Tunbridge Wells	4./JG 27
– Claims with II. Gruppe of Jagdgeschwader 27 – In North Africa — 22 September 1941 – 6 December 1942
7	22 November 1941	16:46	P-40	southeast of Bir Hakeim	Stab II./JG 27	26	7 August 1942	09:21? (Note: According to Mathews and Foreman claimed at 09:30.)	Hurricane	5 km (3.1 mi) northwest of El Alamein	4./JG 27
8	13 December 1941	16:55? (Note: According to Mathews and Foreman claimed at 13:55.)	Blenheim	10 km (6.2 mi) northeast of Timimi	Stab II./JG 27	27	7 August 1942	09:23	P-40	south of El Hamam	4./JG 27
9	22 May 1942	07:33	P-40	30 km (19 mi) east of Timimi	4./JG 27	28	10 August 1942	11:04	P-40	southeast of El Alamein	4./JG 27
10	22 May 1942	07:45	P-40	3 km (1.9 mi) north of Ain el Gazala	4./JG 27	29	10 August 1942	11:05	P-40	south-southeast of El Alamein	4./JG 27
11	23 May 1942	10:05	P-40	5 km (3.1 mi) south of Ain el Gazala	4./JG 27	30♠	12 August 1942	06:43	Hurricane	southeast of El Alamein	4./JG 27
12	30 May 1942	16:03	P-40	east of Fort Acroma	4./JG 27	31♠	12 August 1942	06:50	Hurricane	west of Alam-el-Kadim	4./JG 27
13	8 June 1942	06:03	P-40	east of Bir Hakeim	4./JG 27	32♠	12 August 1942	06:52	Hurricane	east of Alam-el-Kadim	4./JG 27
14	8 June 1942	06:25? (Note: According to Mathews and Foreman claimed at 06:30.)	P-40	8 km (5.0 mi) southeast of Bir Hakeim	4./JG 27	33♠	12 August 1942	07:02	P-40	southwest of Alam-el-Halfa	4./JG 27
15	9 June 1942	08:25	P-40	southeast of El Adem	4./JG 27	34♠	12 August 1942	07:04	P-40	southwest of Alam-el-Halfa	4./JG 27
16	27 June 1942	18:55	P-40	southeast of Mersa Matruh	4./JG 27	35	16 August 1942	08:28	P-40	south of Alam-el-Kadim	4./JG 27
17	27 June 1942	19:00	P-40	southeast of Mersa Matruh	4./JG 27	36	16 August 1942	08:35	P-40	east of Alam-el-Kadim	4./JG 27
18	23 July 1942	18:10	Spitfire	south of El Alamein	4./JG 27	37	16 August 1942	08:40	P-40	south of El Hamam	4./JG 27
19	3 August 1942	18:12	Spitfire	northwest of El Hamam	4./JG 27	38	19 August 1942	09:01	Spitfire	west of El Hamam	4./JG 27
20	4 August 1942	08:10	P-40	southeast of El Alamein	4./JG 27	39	19 August 1942	09:05	Spitfire	west-southwest of El Hamam	4./JG 27
21	4 August 1942	13:30	Spitfire	northwest of El Hamam	4./JG 27	40	22 August 1942	07:28	Spitfire	south of El Hamam	4./JG 27
22	5 August 1942	10:08	P-40	Alam-el-Halfa	4./JG 27	41	22 August 1942	07:30	Spitfire	south of Alam Uzeiligh	4./JG 27
23	6 August 1942	12:05	P-40	east of Deir-el-Abaid	4./JG 27	42	2 September 1942	09:22	Spitfire	south-southwest of Imayid	4./JG 27
24	6 August 1942	12:08	P-40	southwest of El Alamein	4./JG 27	? (Note: This claim is not listed by Prien, Stemmer, Rodeike and Bock.)	3 September 1942	11:40	Spitfire		Stab II./JG 27
25	7 August 1942	09:13	Hurricane	southeast of Alam-el-Kadim	4./JG 27						
– Claims with II. Gruppe of Jagdgeschwader 27 – Defense of the Reich — 1 August – 31 December 1943
—	14 October 1943	—	B-17	Kirn, west of Bad Kreuznach	Stab II./JG 27	44?	11 December 1943	13:25	B-17*	east of Groningen	5./JG 27
43?	14 October 1943	15:00	B-17	Avricourt, southwest of Sarrebourg	Stab II./JG 27						
– Claims with II. Gruppe of Jagdgeschwader 27 – Defense of the Reich — 1 January – 25 April 1944
45?	11 January 1944	12:40~	P-47	south of Meppel	5./JG 27	48	8 March 1944	13:35	B-17	3 km (1.9 mi) west of Leitzkau; 10 km (6.2 mi) northeast of Magdeburg	5./JG 27
46?	11 January 1944	12:55~	B-24	north of Lhee	5./JG 27	49	8 March 1944	14:10~	B-17	west of Coburg, 35 km (22 mi) north of Bamberg	5./JG 27
47	29 January 1944	10:52	B-17*	south of Seemoos	5./JG 27	50?	8 April 1944	14:15~	B-24*	northeast of Braunschweig	5./JG 27

=== Awards ===
- Iron Cross (1939)
  - 2nd Class (8 June 1940)
  - 1st Class
- Honor Goblet of the Luftwaffe on 28 September 1942 as Oberfeldwebel and pilot
- German Cross in Gold on 15 October 1942 as Oberfeldwebel in the 4./Jagdgeschwader 27
- Knight's Cross of the Iron Cross on 30 December 1942 as Oberfeldwebel and pilot in the 5./Jagdgeschwader 27 (Note: According to Scherzer as pilot in the II./Jagdgeschwader 27.)
