= Rolf Hermichen =

German World War II fighter pilot (1918–2014)

- Born: 25 July 1918; Wernigerode, Kingdom of Prussia, German Empire
- Died: 23 May 2014 (aged 95)
- Military career
- Allegiance: Nazi Germany
- Branch: Luftwaffe
- Rank: Major
- Units: ZG 1, ZG 76, SKG 210, JG 26, JG 11, JG 104
- Conflicts: World War II
- Awards: Knight's Cross of the Iron Cross with Oak Leaves
- Other work: Manager at Karstadt

Rolf Hermichen (25 July 1918 – 23 May 2014) was a German Luftwaffe fighter ace and recipient of the Knight's Cross of the Iron Cross with Oak Leaves (German: Ritterkreuz des Eisernen Kreuzes mit Eichenlaub) during World War II. The Knight's Cross of the Iron Cross, and its variants were the highest awards in the military and paramilitary forces of Nazi Germany during World War II.

== Career ==
He was born in Wernigerode in the district of Harz.

On 15 July 1942, Hermichen was appointed Staffelkapitän (squadron leader) of 3. Staffel of JG 26. He succeeded Oberleutnant Johannes Schmidt who was transferred. On 13 June 1943, the Gruppenkommandeur (group commander) of III. Gruppe, Hauptmann Kurt Ruppert was killed in action. Command of the Gruppe was temporarily given to Hermichen. On 29 June, Geschwaderkommodore Josef Priller appointed Major Klaus Mietusch as the new commander of III. Gruppe. Mietusch assumed command on 5 July and Hermichen returned to 3. Staffel.

On 16 October 1943, Herminchen was appointed Gruppenkommandeur of I. Gruppe of Jagdgeschwader 11 (JG 11—11th Fighter Wing). He succeeded Hauptmann Erich Woitke who temporarily led the Gruppe after Hauptmann Erwin Clausen was killed in action on 4 October. On 2 April 1944, Hermichen was presented the Knight's Cross of the Iron Cross (Ritterkreuz des Eisernen Kreuzes) by Generaloberst Hans-Jürgen Stumpff at the airfield in Rotenburg an der Wümme. The Knight's Cross had been awarded on 26 March.

On 12 May, the Eighth Army Air Force targeted the German fuel industry. In total 886 four-engined bombers, escorted by 980 fighter aircraft, headed for the five main synthetic fuel factories in middle Germany in area of Leuna, Merseburg, Böhlen and Zeitz, and the Protectorate of Bohemia and Moravia and Brüx. That day, Hermichen was shot down in aerial combat near Limburg an der Lahn. In consequence, he was transferred to the staff of the 2. Jagd-Division (2nd Fighter Division) based in Stade. Hermichen was replaced by Oberleutnant Hans-Heinrich Koenig as commander of I. Gruppe.

On 30 November 1944, Hermichen attended a meeting held by the Inspector of Day Fighters, Oberst Günther Lützow at the Altemburg Airfield. Lützow had invited the commanding officers of various Luftwaffe training units to discuss the status of fighter pilot training. Among others, the meeting was attended by Karl-Heinz Schnell, Gerhard Koall, Reinhard Seiler, Hans von Hahn and Josef Fözö.

== Summary of career ==
=== Aerial victory claims ===
According to US historian David T. Zabecki, Hermichen was credited with 64 aerial victories. Obermaier also lists him with 64 aerial victories claimed in 629 combat missions, 11 of them while flying the Messerschmitt Bf 110. He shot down 53 enemy aircraft in Defense of the Reich, including 26 four-engine strategic bombers. Forsyth also lists him with 26 heavy bombers shot down. Mathews and Foreman, authors of Luftwaffe Aces – Biographies and Victory Claims, researched the German Federal Archives and found records for 49 aerial victory claims, plus eight further unconfirmed claims. This figure includes 11 aerial victories on the Eastern Front and 38 over the Western Allies, including 17 four-engine bombers.

Victory claims were logged to a map-reference (PQ = Planquadrat), for example "PQ 35 Ost 28321". The Luftwaffe grid map (Jägermeldenetz) covered all of Europe, western Russia and North Africa and was composed of rectangles measuring 15 minutes of latitude by 30 minutes of longitude, an area of about 360 square miles (930 km^{2}). These sectors were then subdivided into 36 smaller units to give a location area 3 km × 4 km (1.9 mi × 2.5 mi) in size.

Chronicle of aerial victories
This and the – (dash) indicates unconfirmed aerial victory claims for which Hermichen did not receive credit. This along with the * (asterisk) indicates an Herausschuss (separation shot)—a severely damaged heavy bomber forced to separate from his combat box which was counted as an aerial victory. This and the ? (question mark) indicates information discrepancies listed by Prien, Stemmer, Rodeike, Bock, Mathews and Foreman.
Claim	Date	Time	Type	Location	Claim	Date	Time	Type	Location
– 6. Staffel of Zerstörergeschwader 1 – Battle of France — 10 May – 25 June 1940
1	10 May 1940	11:15	Battle	Waalhaven	2	27 May 1940	—	Spitfire	
—	15 May 1940	—	M.S.406		—	30 May 1940	—	Potez 63	
– 9. Staffel of Zerstörergeschwader 76 – Battle of Britain — 10 July – 31 October 1940
—	12 August 1940	—	Hurricane		—	25 August 1940	—	Hurricane	
—	15 August 1940	—	Spitfire						
– III. Gruppe of Zerstörergeschwader 76 – Norwegian Coast
3	9 February 1941	11:00	Beaufort	Mandal					
– 6. Staffel of Schnellkampfgeschwader 210 – Operation Barbarossa — 22 June – 5 December 1941
4	6 September 1941	—	Yak-1		6	22 October 1941	—	Pe-2	
5	12 October 1941	—	Yak-1						
– 7. Staffel of Jagdgeschwader 26 "Schlageter" – On the Western Front — 1 January – 15 July 1942
12? (Note: Prien, Stemmer, Rodeike and Bock Prien list this claim as Hermichen's 12th aerial victory, while Mathews and Foreman present this claim as his 7th aerial victory.)	4 April 1942	11:35	Spitfire	northwest of Brouckerque off Lister	13	12 April 1942	13:43	Spitfire	3 km (1.9 mi) north of Cassel
– 3. Staffel of Jagdgeschwader 26 "Schlageter" – On the Western Front — 15 July – 31 December 1942
14	9 May 1942	17:42	Spitfire	10 km (6.2 mi) northwest of Koksijde	18	19 August 1942	11:28	P-39	Dieppe
15	30 July 1942	19:11	Hurricane	Saint-Omer-Wizernes	19	4 December 1942	14:35	Spitfire	10 km (6.2 mi) northeast of Desvres south of Ardres
16	18 August 1942	15:01? (Note: According to Mathews and Foreman claimed at 15:04.)	Spitfire	20 km (12 mi) south of Dungeness	20	6 December 1942	11:37	Spitfire	20 km (12 mi) west of Le Tréport
17	19 August 1942	09:51	Spitfire	northeast of Dieppe	21	19 December 1942	14:15	US-fighter	25 km (16 mi) east-southeast of Deal
– Stab I. Gruppe of Jagdgeschwader 26 "Schlageter" – On the Eastern Front — 2 February – 7 June 1943
22	18 February 1943	08:23	LaGG-3	PQ 35 Ost 28321	26	5 March 1943	15:09	P-40	PQ 35 Ost 18443
23	19 February 1943	09:59	Il-2	PQ 35 Ost 18293	27	7 March 1943	10:03	Pe-2	PQ 35 Ost 18254
24	19 February 1943	10:01	Il-2	PQ 35 Ost 18462	28	7 March 1943	15:43	Pe-2	PQ 35 Ost 18551
25	4 March 1943	08:03	Pe-2	PQ 35 Ost 18242	29	23 March 1943	13:42	Yak-7	PQ 36 Ost 00412
– 3. Staffel of Jagdgeschwader 26 "Schlageter" – Defense of the Reich — 5 July – 15 October 1943
31? (Note: Prien, Stemmer, Rodeike and Bock Prien list this claim as Hermichen's 31st aerial victory, while Mathews and Foreman present this claim as his 25th aerial victory.)	28 July 1943	12:17	Typhoon	PQ 05 Ost S/JH-1/NH-7 west of Rotterdam	34	12 August 1943	08:42	B-17*	PQ 05 Ost S/KN-3/6; Mönchengladbach
32	30 July 1943	10:12	B-17	PQ 05 Ost S/JM-3; Nijmegen	35	15 August 1943	11:58? (Note: According to Mathews and Foreman claimed at 11:59.)	Spitfire	PQ 05 Ost S/KG-7; Vlissingen-North Sea
33	30 July 1943	10:15	P-47	PQ 05 Ost S/JM-2/3; Dordrecht					
– Stab I. Gruppe of Jagdgeschwader 11 – Defense of the Reich — 16 October – 31 December 1943
36	5 November 1943	14:02	P-47	PQ KH, Schouwen	38	1 December 1943	12:20	B-24	PQ 05 Ost OO-8/6, south of Euskirchen
—	5 November 1943	—	B-17*		—	1 December 1943	—	B-24*	south of Euskirchen
37	13 November 1943	11:30	B-24	PQ 05 Ost SS-5/6 east of Husum	39	11 December 1943	12:17	B-17	PQ 05 Ost AP-2/4; 25 km (16 mi) north of Norderney
– Stab I. Gruppe of Jagdgeschwader 11 – Defense of the Reich — January – June 1944
49? (Note: Prien and Rodeike list this claim as Hermichen's 49th aerial victory, while Mathews and Foreman present this claim as his 34th aerial victory.)	10 February 1944	12:55	B-17	PQ 05 Ost S/EP-8, northwest of Lingen	57	8 March 1944	15:26	B-24	PQ 15 Ost S/FA, north of Großburgwedel
50	20 February 1944	13:27	B-24	PQ 05 Ost S/JU-4, vicinity of Holzminden	58	8 March 1944	15:28	B-24	PQ 15 Ost S/FA, north of Großburgwedel
51	20 February 1944	13:30	B-24	PQ 05 Ost S/JU-1, vicinity of Holzminden	59	8 March 1944	15:36	B-17	PQ 15 Ost S/FA, vicinity of Celle
52	20 February 1944	13:37	B-24	PQ 15 Ost S/JA-1/1, vicinity of Gotha	60? (Note: According to Mathews and Foreman this claim is unconfirmed.)	8 March 1944	15:47	B-17	
53	20 February 1944	13:45	B-24	PQ 05 Ost S/JU-6, vicinity of Holzminden	61	23 March 1944	10:03? (Note: According to Mathews and Foreman claimed at 10:05.)	B-17	PQ 05 Ost S/ES, south of Bremen
54	3 March 1944	12:02	B-17	west of Tönning	62	15 April 1944	13:56? (Note: According to Mathews and Foreman claimed at 13:57.)	P-38	PQ 05 Ost S/DT, vicinity of Rotenburg
54	6 March 1944	12:00	B-17	PQ 05 Ost S/EP, vicinity of Haselünne	63	15 April 1944	13:57? (Note: According to Mathews and Foreman claimed at 14:00.)	P-38	PQ 05 Ost S/DT-2/9, vicinity of Rotenburg
55	6 March 1944	12:06	B-17	PQ 05 Ost S/ER, south of Delmenhorst	64	24 April 1944	13:06	P-51	PQ 05 Ost S/SS, vicinity of Mannheim
56	6 March 1944	12:12	B-17	PQ 05 Ost S/ER, south of Delmenhorst					

=== Awards ===
- Iron Cross (1939)
  - 2nd Class (24 April 1940)
  - 1st Class (7 June 1940)
- Honour Goblet of the Luftwaffe on 5 January 1942 as Oberleutnant and pilot
- German Cross in Gold on 15 October 1942 as Oberleutnant in the 3./Jagdgeschwader 26
- Knight's Cross of the Iron Cross with Oak Leaves
  - Knight's Cross on 26 March 1944 as Hauptmann and Gruppenkommandeur of the I./Jagdgeschwader 11
  - 748th Oak Leaves on 19 February 1945 as Major and Gruppenkommandeur of the I./Jagdgeschwader 11
