= Reinhard Seiler =

German World War II flying ace (1909–1989)

- Seiler as Major
- Born: 30 August 1909; Rawitsch, Province of Posen, German Empire
- Died: 6 October 1989 (aged 80); Grafengehaig, Bavaria, West Germany
- Military career
- Allegiance: Nazi Germany
- Branch: Luftwaffe
- Service years: 1935–1945
- Rank: Major (major)
- Units: Condor Legion, JG 54, JG 104
- Commands: 1./JG 54, I./JG 54, JG 104
- Conflicts: See battles Spanish Civil War World War II: Battle of France; Eastern Front; Operation Barbarossa; Siege of Leningrad; Battle of Kursk; Defence of the Reich
- Awards: Spanish Cross in Gold with Swords and Diamonds; Knight's Cross of the Iron Cross with Oak Leaves

Reinhard Seiler (30 August 1909 – 6 October 1989) was a German Luftwaffe Major and ace of the Spanish Civil War and World War II, commander of Jagdgeschwader 104 and a winner of the Knight's Cross of the Iron Cross with Oak Leaves; for the fighter pilots, it was a quantifiable measure of skill and combat success. Seiler was credited with 100 victories during World War II, over the course of about 500 combat missions. He recorded an additional 9 victories during the Spanish Civil War.

== Childhood and early career ==
Seiler was born on 30 August 1909 in Rawitsch, in the Province of Posen, at the time a Prussian province of the German Empire and now in Poland. He was the son of Justizoberwachtmeister, a police officer at court. He joined the newly created Luftwaffe in 1935 and was promoted to Leutnant (second lieutenant) on 20 April 1937. After completing his pilot training, he was sent to Spain with the Condor Legion, and served with 2. Staffel (2nd squadron) of Jagdgruppe 88 (J/88—88th Fighter Group).

On 26 August 1937, the Condor Legion attacked ships in the harbor of Gijón. Flying fighter escort to the bombers, Seiler claimed his first aerial victory when he shot down a Polikarpov I-15 fighter. He claimed his second aerial victory on 4 September, a Polikarpov I-16 shot down over Asturias. On 30 October, command of the Condor Legion transferred from Generalmajor Hugo Sperrle to Generalmajor Hellmuth Volkmann. Volkmann reorganized J/88, placing 2. Staffel under the command of Oberleutnant (First Lieutenant) Joachim Schlichting. Seiler claimed his third aerial victory on 29 November.

When Seiler returned to Germany, he was credited with nine aerial victories and was one of the leading fighter pilots of the Condor Legion. For his service in Spain, he was awarded the Spanish Cross in Gold with Diamonds (Spanienkreuz in Gold mit Schwertern und Brillanten). He was promoted to Oberleutnant on 1 April 1939. The Condor Legion officially returned to Germany on 6 June 1939 and troops marched through Berlin to the Lustgarten, where the fallen were honored. A formal state banquet for the most highly decorated soldiers was held in the marble gallery of the Reich Chancellery. Seiler was seated at table 1, with General der Flieger Hugo Sperrle, General Antonio Aranda, General Gonzalo Queipo de Llano, Oberst Walter Warlimont, Oberstleutnant Hans von Donat, Hauptmann Werner Mölders and Oberfeldwebel Ignaz Prestele.

After his return from Spain, Seiler was appointed the Staffelkapitän (Squadron leader) of the newly established 1. Staffel of Jagdgeschwader 70 (JG 70—70th Fighter Wing) on 15 July 1939. The Staffel was based at Herzogenaurach, equipped with the Messerschmitt Bf 109 D-1 and subordinated to the I. Gruppe (1st group) of Jagdgeschwader 51 (JG 51—51st Fighter Wing) under the command of Major Ernst Freiherr von Berg.

== World War II ==
World War II in Europe began on Friday 1 September 1939 when German forces invaded Poland. Seiler's unit was kept back and on 13 September, it formed the nucleus of the newly created I. Gruppe of Jagdgeschwader 54 (JG 54—54th Fighter Wing) which had been placed under command of Major Hans-Jürgen von Cramon-Taubadel. In consequence, Seiler's 1. Staffel was renamed 1. Staffel of JG 54. On 1 November, the Gruppe was transferred to Böblingen to patrol the southernmost region of the French-German border.

Seiler claimed his first victory of the war on 10 January 1940, shooting down a French reconnaissance Potez 63 southwest of Freiburg. For this, he was awarded the Iron Cross 2nd Class (Eisernes Kreuz zweiter Klasse) on 20 January. He claimed a second aerial victory on 7 April west of Strasbourg, a French Morane-Saulnier M.S.406 fighter. However he scored no further in the subsequent Battle of France, when his unit covered the Panzer advance through the Ardennes forests and later over the Dunkirk bridgehead. Pulled out early, back to occupied Netherlands as the campaign wound down, I. Gruppe of JG 54 was then one of the first units to re-occupy the Pas de Calais, in early August 1940 in anticipation of the upcoming Battle of Britain. On a bomber escort mission over Dover on 5 August 1940, Seiler claimed his third aerial victory, shooting down a Supermarine Spitfire over the English Channel. He was then shot down in his Bf 109 E-4 and severely injured. Taking to his parachute over the English Channel, Seiler was rescued and hospitalized, but was out of action for over 6 months. In consequence, command of 1. Staffel was briefly passed on to Oberleutnant Friedrich Rumpf before Oberleutnant Gerhard Ködderitzsch took command of the Staffel. On 1 December 1940, Seiler was promoted to Hauptmann (captain).

=== Invasion of the Soviet Union ===
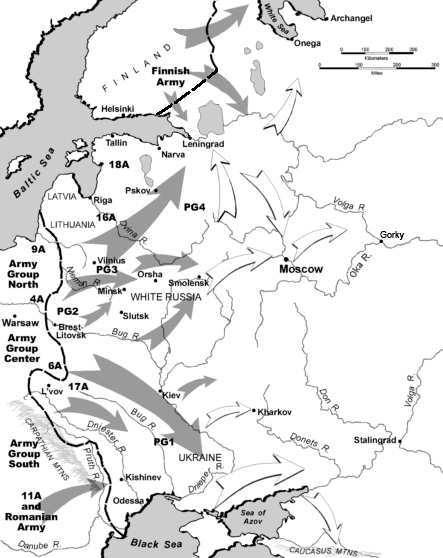
Map indicating Operation Barbarossa's attack plan

Operation Barbarossa, the German invasion of the Soviet Union, began on 22 June 1941. In the fortnight prior, JG 54 had been moved to an airfield in Lindenthal near Rautenberg, East Prussia, present-day Uslowoje in Kaliningrad Oblast. Tasked with supporting Army Group North in its advance through the Baltic states towards Leningrad, the unit began combat operations shortly afterwards.

On the first day of combat operations, Seiler claimed three aerial victories, thereby doubling his total to six. Seiler, who had served with the Gruppenstab (headquarters unit) of I. Gruppe since his convalescence, was again appointed Staffelkapitän of 1. Staffel on 27 June. He replaced Oberleutnant Adolf Kinzinger who had been killed in a flight accident that day. Over the next few weeks, I. Gruppe leap-frogged to new airbases across the Baltic States. The Gruppe had moved to Schaulen, now Šiauliai, on 25 June, to Birži, located approximately 12 kilometers (7.5 miles) southwest of Jēkabpils, and to Alt-Schwanenburg, now Gulbene, on 5 July. Here the following day, Seiler claimed three Tupolev SB-3 bombers shot down. On 29 July, I. Gruppe moved to a makeshift airfield named Malaja Owsischtschi located near Lake Ozero Samro (58°58′18″N 28°46′16″E) east of Lake Peipus where they remained until 24 August. Here, the Gruppe supported German forces in the attack on Leningrad. Here on 20 August, Seiler had been awarded the Honor Goblet of the Luftwaffe (Ehrenpokal der Luftwaffe).

On 8 September, I. Gruppe moved to an airfield at Siverskaya, located approximately 70 kilometers (43 miles) south of Leningrad. The next day, Seiler and his wingman flew a combat air patrol and intercepted a flight of I-16 fighters near Krasnoye Selo where Seiler claimed an I-16 shot down. Flying in a northwestern direction, they flew over a Soviet airfield at Nizinskoye, located approximately 15 kilometers (9.3 miles) northwest of Krasnoye Selo, where 5 IAP (Istrebitelny Aviatsionny Polk—Истребительный Авиационный Полк or Fighter Aviation Regiment) led by Stárshiy Leytenánt Mikhail Bagryantsev was based. Two Lavochkin-Gorbunov-Gudkov LaGG-3 and two Mikoyan-Gurevich MiG-3 took off to intercept the German fighters. In this encounter, Seiler shot down Bagryantsev to take his total to 25 aerial victories. On 11 September, Seiler made an emergency landing at Siverskaya after his Bf 109 F-2 (Werknummer 12692—factory number) had been damaged by enemy fire.

=== Group commander ===
On 1 October 1941, Seiler was appointed Gruppenkommandeur (group commander) of III. Gruppe of JG 54. He replaced Hauptmann Arnold Lignitz who had been posted as missing in action after he had been shot down over Leningrad the day before. Command of his former 1. Staffel was then passed to Oberleutnant Heinz Lange. At the time, III. Gruppe was also based at Siverskaya.

Seiler, who remained in command of III. Gruppe for nearly one and a half years, was awarded the German Cross in Gold (Deutsches Kreuz in Gold) on 15 October. On 20 December, having flown 200 missions, Seiler was awarded the Knight's Cross of the Iron Cross (Ritterkreuz des Eisernen Kreuzes) for 42 aerial victories claimed during World War II. In spring 1942 Geschwaderkommodore (Wing Commander) Hannes Trautloft had the idea for night fighter interceptions of Soviet night-harassment raids on moonlit nights. A great success, they claimed 56 victories for no losses. During these nocturnal combat missions in June 1942, Seiler claimed 15 aerial victories. On the night of 11/12 June, he claimed two Polikarpov R-5 bombers shot down. In the night of 14/15 June, he was credited with the destruction of two further R-5 bombers destroyed. The following night, Seiler was credited with shooting down two R-5 bombers and a single Yakovlev Yak-1 fighter. On the night of 22/23 June, he claimed two Lisunov Li-2, also known as a PS-84, destroyed. On the night of 25/26 June, two R-5 bombers were claimed by him. Seiler claimed his last nocturnal aerial victories, two R-5 bombers, on the night of 27/28 June.

On 30 November, Seiler relocated III. Gruppe to Smolensk where they arrived on 3 December. Here, the Gruppe supported German forces fighting in the Battle of Stalingrad. In early 1943, III. Gruppe rotated back to the Western Front as part of Adolf Galland's mis-guided plan to swap units between the Western and Eastern Fronts in exchange for I. Gruppe of Jagdgeschwader 26 "Schlageter" (JG 26—26th Fighter Wing). On 1 March 1943, Seiler was also promoted to Major (major).

=== Defense of the Reich ===
In mid-February 1943, III. Gruppe of JG 54 was withdrawn from the Eastern Front and ordered to Vendeville, France where it was subordinated to the Geschwaderstab of JG 26. The Gruppe was equipped with the Bf 109 G-4 armed with 20 mm MG 151/20 cannons installed in conformal gun pods under the wings. The original plan was to exchange JG 26 which had been fighting on the Western Front with JG 54. The plan was cancelled in March. Instead of III. Gruppe of JG 54 returning to the Eastern Front, the Gruppe was ordered to Bad Zwischenahn on 25 March and then to Oldenburg Airfield two days later. Here, the Gruppe was subordinated to the 2. Jagd-Division (2nd Fighter Division) which was fighting in defense of the Reich.

On 17 April, III. Gruppe flew its first combat mission in defense of the Reich. That day, the United States Army Air Forces (USAAF) VIII Bomber Command, later renamed to Eighth Air Force, attacked the Focke-Wulf factory in Bremen. The Gruppe was scrambled at 12:29. At 12:40 approximately 120 to 150 Boeing B-17 Flying Fortress bombers were encountered west of Wilhelmshaven. Due to evasive maneuvering of the bombers and the heavy defensive gunfire, the Gruppe initially failed to attack the bombers head-on. At 13:00, III. Gruppe made their first head-on attack while the leading bombers of the 91st and 306th Bombardment Group made their bomb-run. In this attack, Seiler shot down one of the B-17 bombers over Bremen. The Gruppe kept pursuing the bombers and claimed four further bombers shot down, one of which was not confirmed.

On 1 May, Seiler was made the new Gruppenkommandeur of I. Gruppe of JG 54, flying the Focke-Wulf Fw 190. He replaced Hauptmann Gerhard Koall who temporarily led the Gruppe after Major Hans Philipp was transferred to take command of Jagdgeschwader 1 (JG 1—1st Fighter Wing) fighting in defense of the Reich. In consequence, command of III. Gruppe was given to Hauptmann Siegfried Schnell.

=== Eastern Front ===
When Seiler took command of I. Gruppe they were based at Krasnogvardeysk, present-day Gatchina, and unseasonably bad weather limited flight operations for the next few weeks. In early July, the Gruppe was ordered to Oryol in preparation of Operation Citadel. There, I. Gruppe supported Army Group Centre during the Battle of Kursk cover over the northern attack under control of Luftflotte 6 (Air Fleet 6).

On the opening day of the offensive, 5 July, he claimed 5 aerial victories, making him an "ace-in-a-day", to take his tally to 97. The following day he claimed two further aerial victories. Eager to reach the magic 'century', he chased and shot down a Bell P-39 Airacobra fighters from the 30 GvIAP (Guards Fighter Aviation Regiment—Gvardeyskiy Istrebitelny Aviatsionny Polk). However immediately afterward he was himself shot and forced to bail out from his Fw 190 A-5 (Werknummer 1341) badly wounded over enemy territory east of Ponyri, midway between Orel and Kursk. His injuries sustained rendered him unfit for further combat operations for the rest of the war. Seiler was the 44th Luftwaffe pilot to achieve the century mark. Due to his injuries sustained, he was temporarily replaced by Oberleutnant Hans Götz as commander of I. Gruppe before Hauptmann Gerhard Homuth took command on 1 August.

In recognition of his long service and command in JG 54, Seiler was awarded the Knight's Cross of the Iron Cross with Oak Leaves (Ritterkreuz des Eisernen Kreuzes mit Eichenlaub) on 2 March 1944. The presentation was made by Adolf Hitler on 4 April 1944 at the Führerhauptquartier (Führer Headquarter) at the Berghof in Berchtesgaden. Also present at the award ceremony were Gerhard Barkhorn, for the Swords to his Knight's Cross, and Erich Hartmann, Walter Krupinski, Kurt Bühligen, Horst Ademeit, Hans-Joachim Jabs, Dr. Maximilian Otte, Bernhard Jope and Hansgeorg Bätcher from the bomber force, and the Flak officer Fritz Petersen, all destined to receive the Oak Leaves.

On 16 May 1944, following his convalescence, Seiler was appointed Geschwaderkommodore of the fighter-pilot training unit Jagdgeschwader 104 (JG 104—104th Fighter Wing). He served in this capacity until the end of World War II in Europe. (Note: According to Obermaier, Seiler was given command of Jagdgeschwader 104 on 8 August 1944.) On 30 November 1944, Seiler attended a meeting held by the Inspector of Day Fighters, Oberst Günther Lützow at the Altemburg Airfield. Lützow had invited the commanding officers of various Luftwaffe training units to discuss the status of fighter pilot training. Among others, the meeting was attended by Karl-Heinz Schnell, Gerhard Koall, Hans von Hahn, Rolf Hermichen and Josef Fözö.

== Later life ==
Released from Allied captivity in 1946, Seiler died on 6 October 1989 at the age of 80, in the town of Grafengehaig near Kulmbach, in Bavaria.

== Summary of career ==
=== Aerial victory claims ===
According to US historian David T. Zabecki, Seiler was credited with 100 aerial victories during World War II. Spick lists Seiler with 9 aerial victories during the Spanish Civil War and further 100 during World War II. Obermaier also lists him with 109 aerial victories claimed in approximately 500 combat missions. Mathews and Foreman, authors of Luftwaffe Aces — Biographies and Victory Claims, researched the German Federal Archives and found documentation for 109 aerial victory claims, plus three further unconfirmed claims. This number includes 9 claims during the Spanish Civil War, 96 on the Eastern Front, and 4 on the Western Front, including one four-engined bomber.

Victory claims were logged to a map-reference (PQ = Planquadrat), for example "PQ 00254". The Luftwaffe grid map (Jägermeldenetz) covered all of Europe, western Russia and North Africa and was composed of rectangles measuring 15 minutes of latitude by 30 minutes of longitude, an area of about 360 square miles (930 km^{2}). These sectors were then subdivided into 36 smaller units to give a location area 3 km × 4 km (1.9 mi × 2.5 mi) in size.

Chronicle of aerial victories
This and the ♠ (Ace of spades) indicates those aerial victories which made Seiler an "ace-in-a-day", a term which designates a fighter pilot who has shot down five or more airplanes in a single day. This and the ? (question mark) indicates information discrepancies listed by Prien, Stemmer, Rodeike, Bock, Mathews and Foreman.
Claim (total)	Claim (nocturnal)	Date	Time	Type	Location	Claim (total)	Claim (nocturnal)	Date	Time	Type	Location
Spanish Civil War
– 2. Staffel of Jagdgruppe 88 – Spanish Civil War — August 1937 – February 1938
1		26 August 1937	—	I-15		6		7 February 1938	—	SB-2	
2		4 September 1937	—	I-16		7		7 February 1938	—	SB-2	
3		29 November 1937	—	I-16		8		22 February 1938	—	I-15	
4		12 January 1938	—	SB-2		9		22 February 1938	—	I-15	
5		22 January 1938	—	I-16							
World War II
– 1. Staffel of Jagdgeschwader 54 – "Phoney War" — 13 September 1939 – 9 May 1940
1		10 January 1940	12:15	Potez 63	south of Colmar	2		7 April 1940	—	M.S.406	west of Strasbourg
– 1. Staffel of Jagdgeschwader 54 – Action at the Channel and over England — 26 June – 23 September 1940
3		5 August 1940	09:15	Spitfire	English Channel						
– Stab I. Gruppe of Jagdgeschwader 54 – Operation Barbarossa — 22 June – July 1941
4		22 June 1941	05:55	SB-2	northeast of Kowno	6		22 June 1941	05:58	SB-2	west of Kowno
5		22 June 1941	05:57	SB-2	north of Kowno						
– 1. Staffel of Jagdgeschwader 54 – Operation Barbarossa — July – 1 October 1941
7		6 July 1941	10:18	SB-3	Ostrov	21		15 August 1941	19:00	I-18	north of Vitino
8		6 July 1941	10:24	SB-3	northwest of Baraki	22		8 September 1941	16:03	I-16	north of Djeskoje Selo
9		6 July 1941	17:34	SB-3	southwest of Ostrov	23		8 September 1941	16:45	I-153	south of Wladimirskoje
10		7 July 1941	10:31	SB-3	northeast of Ostrov	24		9 September 1941	09:05	I-16	southeast of Krasnoye Selo
11		7 July 1941	11:00	SB-3	Ostrov	25		9 September 1941	09:35	I-18 (MiG-1)	south of Marijino
12		7 July 1941	19:15	I-18 (MiG-1)	north of Ostrov	26		9 September 1941	17:15	I-16	northeast of Krasnogvardeysk
13		22 July 1941	18:05	I-18 (MiG-1)	north of Krasnoye Selo	27		11 September 1941	11:15	I-18 (MiG-1)	Nowa
14		22 July 1941	18:08	I-18 (MiG-1)	southwest of Krasnoye Selo	28		17 September 1941	12:30	I-18 (MiG-1)	south of Lewaschewo
15		31 July 1941	16:55	I-18 (MiG-1)	northwest of Krasnoye Selo	29		21 September 1941	17:05	I-18 (MiG-1)	south of Leningrad
16		31 July 1941	19:50	I-18 (MiG-1)	north of Pulkowa	30		23 September 1941	13:21	I-153	north of Kolpino
17		13 August 1941	05:32	I-16	Molskowitzi	31		24 September 1941	10:12	I-15? (Note: According to Mathews and Foreman claimed as a Polikarpov I-153.)	
18		13 August 1941	11:00	I-18 (MiG-1)	north of Witino	32		26 September 1941	05:55	I-18 (MiG-1)	southeast of Leningrad
19		15 August 1941	14:45	I-18 (MiG-1)	south of Wochonowo airfield	33		29 September 1941	15:58	I-16	west of Shlisselburg
20? (Note: According to Mathews and Foreman this claim is unconfirmed.)		15 August 1941	14:46	I-16	Wochonowo airfield						
– Stab III. Gruppe of Jagdgeschwader 54 – Operation Barbarossa — 1 October – 5 December 1941
34		5 October 1941	17:00	I-15	west of Ust-Starawjanka	39		25 October 1941	16:44	I-153? (Note: According to Mathews and Foreman claimed as a Polikarpov I-15.)	north of the bend of the Neva
35		11 October 1941	15:40	I-15	north of Oranienbaum	40		29 October 1941	11:07	I-26 (Yak-1)	southwest of Gorka
36		24 October 1941	14:02	I-18 (MiG-1)	Mursinka	41		1 December 1941	09:55	R-10 (Seversky)	north of Kobona
37		24 October 1941	14:08	I-18 (MiG-1)	Szalaski	42		1 December 1941	14:25	I-180 (Yak-7)	southwest of Koretschi
38		25 October 1941	16:42	I-153	north of the bend of the Neva						
– Stab III. Gruppe of Jagdgeschwader 54 – Eastern Front — 6 December 1941 – 20 February 1942
43		7 December 1941	12:15	I-180 (Yak-7)	west of Kobona	45		26 January 1942	11:55	I-26 (Yak-1)	southeast of Grjadi
44		26 January 1942	08:50	I-18 (MiG-1)	Osmaskij	46		26 January 1942	12:00	I-26 (Yak-1)	east of Dora
– Stab III. Gruppe of Jagdgeschwader 54 – Eastern Front — 1 May 1942 – 3 February 1943
47		29 May 1942	13:30? (Note: According to Mathews and Foreman claimed at 10:30.)	I-180 (Yak-7)	PQ 00254, mal Muschkino; 15 km (9.3 mi) west-southwest of Shlisselburg	65	13	26 June 1942	00:17? (Note: According to Mathews and Foreman claimed at 00:37.)	R-5	east of Kretschno
? (Note: This claim is not listed by Prien, Stemmer, Rodeike and Bock.)		29 May 1942	11:30	Yak-7		66	14	27 June 1942	23:48	R-5	southwest of Mostki
48	1	11 June 1942	23:35	R-5	east of Mjasnoj Bor	67	15	27 June 1942	24:00	R-5	south of Mostki
49	2	12 June 1942	00:30	R-5	east of Mjasnoj Bor	68		1 August 1942	18:34	Pe-2	PQ 90453, west-southwest of Terwolowo; 15 km (9.3 mi) northeast of Volosovo
50		12 June 1942	16:08	MiG-3	PQ 19251, south of Orelje; 15 km (9.3 mi) southeast of Spasskaya Polist	69		2 August 1942	16:55	Yak-1	PQ 00164, Aleksandrowka; 10 km (6.2 mi) southeast of Leningrad
51		12 June 1942	16:10? (Note: According to Mathews and Foreman claimed at 10:10.)	MiG-3	north of Orelje	70		11 August 1942	17:55	MiG-3	PQ 29711, northwest of Beresko; 45 km (28 mi) northeast of Staraya Russa
52	3	14 June 1942	22:45	R-5	PQ 19152, west of Spasskaya Polist; 15 km (9.3 mi) southwest of Spasskaya Polist	71		11 August 1942	17:58	MiG-3	PQ 29712, northwest of Beresko; 45 km (28 mi) northeast of Staraya Russa
53	4	14 June 1942	23:15	R-5	PQ 19134, northwest of Kretschno vicinity of Spasskaya Polist	72		20 August 1942	17:17	Yak-1	PQ 00421, east of Kolpino; Pushkin-Mga
54	5	15 June 1942	23:20	R-5	east of Kretschno	73		30 August 1942	13:42	I-16	PQ 00143, north of Uljanka; 10 km (6.2 mi) southwest of Leningrad
55	6	15 June 1942	23:30? (Note: According to Mathews and Foreman claimed at 23:20.)	Yak-1	east of Orelje	74		1 September 1942	12:25	MiG-3	PQ 10211, north of Lawrowo; 45 km (28 mi) west of Volkhov
56	7	15 June 1942	24:00	R-5	east of Kretschno	75		5 September 1942	12:15	Il-2	PQ 00412, south of Kolpino; 10 km (6.2 mi) east of Pushkin
57	8	16 June 1942	00:20	R-5	Prijutino	76		5 September 1942	12:25	Il-2	PQ 00281, northeast of Kretschmino; 20 km (12 mi) west of Mga
58		20 June 1942	19:28	P-40	east of Mal. Opotschiwalowo	77		11 September 1942	08:42	MiG-3	PQ 01774, southeast of Pjesk; 20 km (12 mi) west-northwest of Volchov
59	9	22 June 1942	23:05	PS-84	Kretschno	78		21 September 1942	11:15	Yak-1	PQ 10244, northeast of Shelannoje; 25 km (16 mi) east-southeast of Shlisselburg
60	10	22 June 1942	23:08	PS-84	east-northeast of Mjasnoj Bor	79		28 October 1942	11:53	LaGG-3	PQ 28112, east of Topolywa; 40 km (25 mi) northwest of Demyansk
61		23 June 1942	21:13	Yak-1	east of Mjasnoj Bor	80		29 October 1942	10:33	LaGG-3	PQ 18261, Werschinasee; 30 km (19 mi) east-southeast of Staraya Russa
62	11	25 June 1942	23:41? (Note: According to Mathews and Foreman claimed at 23:42.)	R-5	east of Kretschno	81		31 October 1942	07:28	Il-2	PQ 18263, southwest of Gertschizy; 30 km (19 mi) east-southeast of Staraya Russa
63	12	25 June 1942	23:50	R-5	east of Kretschno	82		14 November 1942	11:32	LaGG-3	PQ 20143, Twadnowo west-southwest of Volkhov
64	? (Note: This claim is not listed by Foreman, Mathews and Parry in Luftwaffe Night Fighter Claims 1939–1945.)	26 June 1942	00:15? (Note: According to Mathews and Foreman claimed at 20:05.)	R-5	east of Kretschno						
– Stab III. Gruppe of Jagdgeschwader 54 – Western Front — 27 March – 28 April 1943
83		17 April 1943	13:04	B-17	Bremen						
– Stab I. Gruppe of Jagdgeschwader 54 – Eastern Front — 1 May – 6 July 1943
84		27 May 1943	19:58	LaGG-3	PQ 36 Ost 10752; 25 km (16 mi) south of Lyuban	93♠		5 July 1943	12:20	P-39	PQ 35 Ost 63563, northeast of Ponyri; 10 km (6.2 mi) northwest of Maloarkhangelsk
85		12 June 1943	07:18	MiG-3	PQ 36 Ost 10114, southeast of Shlisselburg	94♠		5 July 1943	12:25	Il-2	PQ 35 Ost 63573, west of Ponyri; 35 km (22 mi) southwest of Maloarkhangelsk
86		19 June 1943	21:07	LaGG-3	PQ 36 Ost 20111 west of Volkhov	95♠		5 July 1943	12:27	MiG-3	PQ 35 Ost 63714; 40 km (25 mi) southwest of Maloarkhangelsk
87		21 June 1943	15:27	LaGG-3	30 km (19 mi) northeast of Novaya Ladoga; 35 km (22 mi) northeast of Volkhov	96♠		5 July 1943	18:29	Il-2	PQ 35 Ost 63624; 20 km (12 mi) northeast of Maloarkhangelsk
88		21 June 1943	15:43	LaGG-3	PQ 36 Ost 21123, Wolchowstroj; Lake Ladoga	97♠		5 July 1943	18:35	La-5	PQ 35 Ost 63654; 35 km (22 mi) east-northeast of Maloarkhangelsk
89		21 June 1943	19:59	La-5	PQ 36 Ost 20272, northwest of Wolchowstroj; 35 km (22 mi) west of Volkhov	98		6 July 1943	08:20	La-5	PQ 35 Ost 63534; 10 km (6.2 mi) northwest of Maloarkhangelsk
90		22 June 1943	02:18	Il-2	PQ 36 Ost 00621; 10 km (6.2 mi) southeast of Gatchina	99		6 July 1943	14:21	LaGG-3	PQ 35 Ost 63572; 35 km (22 mi) southwest of Maloarkhangelsk
91		23 June 1943	20:10	LaGG-3	PQ 36 Ost 01841, east of Uglowo	100		6 July 1943	14:36	P-39	PQ 35 Ost 63593; 20 km (12 mi) south-southwest of Maloarkhangelsk
92		24 June 1943	07:07	LaGG-3	PQ 36 Ost 20122, north of Wolchowstroj west of Volkhov						

=== Awards ===
- Spanish Cross in Gold with Swords and Diamonds (6 June 1939)
- Iron Cross (1939)
  - 2nd Class (20 January 1940)
  - 1st Class (30 July 1940)
- Honor Goblet of the Luftwaffe (20 August 1941)
- German Cross in Gold on 15 October 1941 as Hauptmann in the 1./Jagdgeschwader 54
- Knight's Cross of the Iron Cross with Oak Leaves
  - Knight's Cross on 20 December 1941 as Hauptmann and Gruppenkommandeur of the III./Jagdgeschwader 54
  - 419th Oak Leaves on 2 March 1944 as Major and Gruppenkommandeur of the I./Jagdgeschwader 54

=== Promotions ===
20 April 1937:	Leutnant (second lieutenant)
1 April 1939:	Oberleutnant (first lieutenant)
1 December 1940:	Hauptmann (captain)
1 March 1943:	Major (major)
