= Hans Götz =

German Luftwaffe pilot (1919–1943)

- Born: 2 June 1919; Stuttgart, Germany
- Died: 4 August 1943 (aged 24); Karachev, Russia
- Military career
- Allegiance: Nazi Germany
- Branch: Luftwaffe
- Service years: 1939–1943
- Rank: Hauptmann (captain)
- Unit: JG 54
- Commands: I./JG 54
- Conflicts: World War II: Eastern Front; Western Front
- Awards: Knight's Cross of the Iron Cross

Hans Götz (2 June 1919 – 4 August 1943) was a former Luftwaffe fighter ace and recipient of the Knight's Cross of the Iron Cross during World War II. Hans Götz was credited with 82 victories in 600 combat missions. He claimed three victories over the Western Front.

== Career ==
Götz was born on 2 June 1922 in Stuttgart, the capital of the Free People's State of Württemberg of the Weimar Republic.

On 22 February 1943, Götz was appointed Staffelkapitän (squadron leader) of 2. Staffel of Jagdgeschwader 54 (JG 54—54th Fighter Wing). He succeeded Oberleutnant Siegfried Graf Matuschka who was transferred. When on 6 July Major Reinhard Seiler was wounded in combat, Götz was temporarily given the position of Gruppenkommandeur (group commander) of I. Gruppe of JG 54 until the new commander Hauptmann Gerhard Homuth took command on 1 August. The following day, Homuth was killed in action and Götz again assumed command of the Gruppe. Only two days later, on 4 August, Götz was killed in action following combat with Ilyushin Il-2 ground attack aircraft. His Focke-Wulf Fw 190 A-5 (Werknummer 1119—factory number) crashed and exploded northeast of Karachev.

== Summary of career ==
=== Aerial victory claims ===
According to US historian David T. Zabecki, Götz was credited with 82 aerial victories. Mathews and Foreman, authors of Luftwaffe Aces — Biographies and Victory Claims, researched the German Federal Archives and found documentation for 82 aerial victory claims. This number includes 79 claims on the Eastern Front and three over the Western Allies.

Victory claims were logged to a map-reference (PQ = Planquadrat), for example "PQ 29323". The Luftwaffe grid map (Jägermeldenetz) covered all of Europe, western Russia and North Africa and was composed of rectangles measuring 15 minutes of latitude by 30 minutes of longitude, an area of about 360 square miles (930 km^{2}). These sectors were then subdivided into 36 smaller units to give a location area 3 km × 4 km (1.9 mi × 2.5 mi) in size.

Chronicle of aerial victories
This and the ? (question mark) indicates information discrepancies listed by Prien, Stemmer, Rodeike, Bock, Mathews and Foreman.
Claim	Date	Time	Type	Location	Claim	Date	Time	Type	Location
– 1. Staffel of Jagdgeschwader 54 – At the Channel and over England — 26 June – 23 September 1940
1	15 August 1940	15:15	Hurricane	10 km (6.2 mi) off Maidstone over sea	3	9 September 1940	19:05	Spitfire	
2	9 September 1940	19:00	Spitfire						
– 1. Staffel of Jagdgeschwader 54 – Operation Barbarossa — 22 June – 5 December 1941
4	25 June 1941	11:43	I-18 (MiG-1)		11	24 September 1941	10:13	I-153	
5	25 June 1941	11:48	I-18 (MiG-1)		12	26 September 1941	05:55	I-18 (MiG-1)	
6	7 July 1941	16:00	SB-3		13	26 September 1941	06:50	I-18 (MiG-1)	
7	20 July 1941	10:25	SB-3		14	29 September 1941	15:22	SB-3	
8	10 August 1941	04:45	Pe-2		15	25 October 1941	11:03	I-26 (Yak-1)	
9	13 August 1941	17:40	I-18 (MiG-1)		16	29 October 1941	11:02	I-26 (Yak-1)	
10	23 September 1941	11:05	I-18 (MiG-1)						
– 1. Staffel of Jagdgeschwader 54 – Eastern Front — 6 December 1941 – 30 April 1942
17	13 December 1941	13:50	I-16		22	15 March 1942	16:35	P-40	
18	17 December 1941	13:25	I-16? (Note: According to Matthews and Foreman claimed as a Yakovlev Yak-1.)		23	16 March 1942	10:40	Pe-2	8 km (5.0 mi) southeast of Nirischi
19	1 January 1942	12:03	I-18 (MiG-1)		24	18 March 1942	13:27	P-40	
20	21 February 1942	14:14	I-18 (MiG-1)		25	27 April 1942	08:31	U-2	PQ 29323; 20 km (12 mi) southeast of Malaya Vishera
21	14 March 1942	16:16	I-16						
– 1. Staffel of Jagdgeschwader 54 – Eastern Front — 1 May – September 1942
26	10 May 1942	09:45	Yak-1	east of Leningrad	36	24 August 1942	16:04	LaGG-3	PQ 4748; 10 km (6.2 mi) west of Staritsa
27	30 May 1942	18:03	I-16		37	25 August 1942	04:38	Il-2	PQ 47554; 15 km (9.3 mi) northwest of Rzhev
28	30 May 1942	18:35	P-40		38	25 August 1942	04:42	Il-2	PQ 47651; 20 km (12 mi) southwest of Staritsa
29	30 May 1942	18:38	P-40		39	26 August 1942	15:29	U-2	PQ 47483; 10 km (6.2 mi) west of Staritsa
30	3 June 1942	14:34	U-2		40	26 August 1942	15:44	LaGG-3	PQ 47153; 30 km (19 mi) east-southeast of Torzhok
31	15 June 1942	15:25	LaGG-3		41	27 August 1942	11:44	Yak-1	PQ 46231; 30 km (19 mi) southeast of Zubtsov
32	23 June 1942	09:38	Il-2		42	27 August 1942	11:55	Yak-1	PQ 56142; 45 km (28 mi) north-northeast of Gagarin
33	23 June 1942	09:41	Il-2		43	29 August 1942	16:12? (Note: According to Mathews and Foreman claimed at 16:13.)	Il-2	PQ 10182 east of Mga
34	22 August 1942	15:28	Hurricane	PQ 47872; 15 km (9.3 mi) south of Zubtsov	44	2 September 1942	13:00	Il-2	PQ 10141 east of Shlisselburg
35	23 August 1942	14:50	Yak-1	PQ 54261; 15 km (9.3 mi) west-northwest of Belyov					
– 3. Staffel of Jagdgeschwader 54 – Eastern Front — November 1942
45	5 November 1942	09:44	I-153	PQ 11754 over Lake Ladoga	47	9 November 1942	14:13	I-153	PQ 11742; 20 km (12 mi) north of Shlisselburg
46	7 November 1942	12:25	MiG-3	PQ 11791 over Lake Ladoga	48	11 November 1942	14:25	P-40	PQ 11763 over Lake Ladoga
– 2. Staffel of Jagdgeschwader 54 – Eastern Front — January – 3 February 1943
49	13 January 1943	07:59	La-5	PQ 10174 southeast of Shlisselburg	53	23 January 1943	11:10	Yak-1	PQ 1014
50	14 January 1943	11:10	La-5	PQ 10163 southeast of Shlisselburg	54	24 January 1943	10:15	Il-2	PQ 1015
51	14 January 1943	11:12	La-5	PQ 10164 southeast of Shlisselburg	55	24 January 1943	14:52	Il-2	PQ 00421; Pushkin-Mga
52	15 January 1943	08:44	Su-2 (Seversky)	PQ 10192 east of Mga	56	27 January 1943	08:37	Il-2	PQ 00292; 10 km (6.2 mi) west of Mga
– 2. Staffel of Jagdgeschwader 54 – Eastern Front — 4 February – 4 August 1943
57	11 February 1943	09:33	Il-2	PQ 36 Ost 00482; 10 km (6.2 mi) west of Tosno	70	6 July 1943	14:35	Yak-1? (Note: According to Mathews and Foreman claimed as a Yakovlev Yak-7.)	PQ 35 Ost 63671; 15 km (9.3 mi) south of Maloarkhangelsk
58	11 February 1943	09:40	Il-2	PQ 36 Ost 00413; 10 km (6.2 mi) east of Pushkin	71	7 July 1943	13:30	La-5	PQ 35 Ost 6357
59	15 February 1943	07:30	Il-2	PQ 36 Ost 10563; 10 km (6.2 mi) east of Lyuban	72	8 July 1943	13:36	LaGG-3	PQ 35 Ost 63551; 15 km (9.3 mi) west-southwest of Maloarkhangelsk
60	22 February 1943	15:45	LaGG-3	PQ 36 Ost 00432; 10 km (6.2 mi) southwest of Mga	73	9 July 1943	12:00	LaGG-3	PQ 35 Ost 63811; 25 km (16 mi) south of Maloarkhangelsk
61	23 February 1943	14:54	Pe-2	PQ 36 Ost 00251; 15 km (9.3 mi) west-southwest of Shlisselburg	74	10 July 1943	08:11	LaGG-3	PQ 35 Ost 63538; 15 km (9.3 mi) west-southwest of Maloarkhangelsk
62	28 February 1943	06:20	U-2	PQ 35 Ost 29164; 15 km (9.3 mi) east of Malaya Vishera	75	12 July 1943	07:39	La-5	PQ 35 Ost 64385; 15 km (9.3 mi) southeast of Bolkhov
63	7 March 1943	12:48	Il-2	PQ 26 Ost 90252; 20 km (12 mi) southeasr of Lomonosov	76	16 July 1943	13:31	Yak-9	PQ 35 Ost 54539; 40 km (25 mi) west of Bolkhov
64	15 March 1943	09:50	P-39	PQ 35 Ost 29831; 45 km (28 mi) north of Demyansk	77	17 July 1943	08:49	LaGG-3	PQ 35 Ost 54645; 25 km (16 mi) west-southwest of Bolkhov
65	1 April 1943	13:35	Il-2	PQ 36 Ost 10151 southeast of Shlisselburg	78	31 July 1943	09:10	Yak-9	PQ 35 Ost 54672; 30 km (19 mi) southwest of Bolkhov
66	5 July 1943	03:51	LaGG-3	PQ 35 Ost 63683; 20 km (12 mi) near Maloarkhangelsk	79	1 August 1943	17:37	La-5	PQ 35 Ost 64563; 10 km (6.2 mi) south of Bolkhov
67	5 July 1943	07:10	P-39	PQ 35 Ost 63729; 35 km (22 mi) southwest of Maloarkhangelsk	80	2 August 1943	04:41	LaGG-3	PQ 35 Ost 54821; 25 km (16 mi) southwest of Bolkhov
68	5 July 1943	15:55	Boston	PQ 35 Ost 63633; 35 km (22 mi) east-northeast of Maloarkhangelsk	81	2 August 1943	14:37	LaGG-3	PQ 35 Ost 53479; 25 km (16 mi) southwest of Dmitrovsk
69	6 July 1943	07:35	Yak-1?	PQ 35 Ost 63577; 25 km (16 mi) west-southwest of Maloarkhangelsk	82	2 August 1943	19:20	LaGG-3	PQ 35 Ost 53631; 40 km (25 mi) west-northwest of Maloarkhangelsk

=== Awards ===
- Iron Cross (1939) 2nd and 1st Class
- Honor Goblet of the Luftwaffe on 10 November 1941 as Leutnant and pilot
- German Cross in Gold on 2 July 1942 as Oberleutnant in the I./Jagdgeschwader 54
- Knight's Cross of the Iron Cross on 23 December 1942 as Oberleutnant and pilot in the 2./Jagdgeschwader 54 (Note: According to Scherzer as pilot in the I./Jagdgeschwader 54.)
