= Herbert Schramm =

German World War II fighter pilot (1913–1943)

- Born: 13 October 1913; Wetzlar
- Died: 1 December 1943 (aged 30); Eupen, Belgium
- Cause of death: Killed in action
- Burial place: Alter Friedhof Wetzlar (old cemetery Wetzlar)
- Military career
- Allegiance: Nazi Germany
- Branch: Luftwaffe
- Service years: 1939–1943
- Rank: Hauptmann (captain)
- Units: JG 53, JG 27
- Commands: 5./JG 27
- Conflicts: See battles: World War II; Battle of France; Battle of Britain; Eastern Front; Defence of the Reich †
- Awards: Knight's Cross of the Iron Cross with Oak Leaves

Herbert Schramm (13 October 1913 – 1 December 1943) was a German Luftwaffe military aviator during World War II, a fighter ace credited with 42 aerial victories claimed in 480 combat missions. He claimed 28 aerial victories on the Eastern Front and further 14 victories over the Western Allies.

Born in Wetzlar, Schramm was a pilot and flight instructor prior to joining the Luftwaffe. Posted to Jagdgeschwader 53 (JG 53—53rd Fighter Wing), he claimed his first aerial victory on 14 May 1940 during the Battle of France. He then fought in the Battle of Britain and Operation Barbarossa, the German invasion of the Soviet Union in June 1941. Following 25 aerial victories claimed, Schramm was awarded the Knight's Cross of the Iron Cross in August 1941. In early 1942, his unit fought in the Mediterranean theater. In April 1942, Schramm served as a fighter pilot instructor. On 13 August 1943, Schramm was appointed Staffelkapitän (squadron leader) of 5. Staffel of Jagdgeschwader 27 (JG 27—27th Fighter Wing). On 1 December 1943, he was killed in action near Eupen during aerial combat with United States Army Air Forces fighters. Posthumously, he was awarded the Knight's Cross of the Iron Cross with Oak Leaves.

== Early life and career ==
Schramm was born on 13 October 1913 in Wetzlar, at the time in the Rhine Province within the German Empire. Prior to joining the military service, he worked as a pilot and flight instructor for Siebel aircraft manufacturing. During training exercises with the military reserve force, Schramm was trained as a fighter pilot. When German forces invaded Poland on 1 September 1939 which marking the beginning of World War II, he was posted to 8. Staffel (8th squadron) of Jagdgeschwader 53 (JG 53—53rd Fighter Wing) holding the rank of Feldwebel.

== World War II ==
On 26 September 1939, JG 53 was ordered to form its III. Gruppe (3rd group) which was placed under command of Hauptmann Werner Mölders. Subordinated to III. Gruppe was 8. Staffel which was then headed by Oberleutnant Hans von Hahn. During the Battle of France, JG 53 was subordinated to Luftflotte 3 (Air Fleet 3) commanded by General der Flieger Hugo Sperrle, supporting Army Group A's breakthrough area. On 14 May 1940, Schramm claimed a Morane-Saulnier M.S.406 fighter shot down which was not confirmed. On 27 May, III. Gruppe moved to an airfield near La Selve. That day, Schramm claimed his first confirmed aerial victory when he shot down a M.S.406. Following the Battle of France, JG 53 enjoyed a brief period of rest until mid-July 1940. On 10 July, III. Gruppe moved to an airfield near Brest. The Gruppe moved to Guernsey on 9 August during the Battle of Britain.

Schramm claimed his first aerial victory against the Royal Air Force (RAF) on 2 September. Depending on source, the aircraft claimed was either a Hawker Hurricane fighter, or a Supermarine Spitfire fighter. On 15 September, also known as the Battle of Britain Day, the Gruppe encountered 20 to 30 RAF fighters south of London. In this aerial battle, six victories were claimed by pilots of III. Gruppe, including a Spitfire by Schramm. On 26 September, III. Gruppe was scrambled to intercept a formation of Handley Page Hampden bombers. On this mission, Schramm claimed one of the Hampden bombers shot down. On 30 September, the Luftwaffe flew 173 bomber and 1,015 fighter missions over England. In the combat area Dungeness - Hastings - London, III. Gruppe claimed seven aerial victories, including two Spitfire fighters by Schramm. The next daym Schramm was promoted to Leutnant (second lieutenant) of the Reserves. On 11 December, JG 53 flew its last combat mission for the year. On 19 December, III. Gruppe was withdrawn from the English Channel and relocated to an airfield at München-Gladbach, present-day Mönchengladbach, for a period of rest and replenishment.

In early February 1941, the pilots returned from vacation to the airfield München-Gladbach and began training for their next deployment. On 1 March, III. Gruppe's ground-elements travelled to Berck-sur-Mer in France while the pilots began conversion training to the then new Messerschmitt Bf 109 F series at Mannheim-Sandhofen Airfield. On 16 April, Schramm claimed two Spitfire fighters shot down. However, this claim was not confirmed and were his claims filed on the English Channel.

=== War against the Soviet Union ===
On 8 June 1941, the bulk of JG 53's air elements moved via Jever, in northern Germany, to Mannheim-Sandhofen. There the aircraft were given a maintenance overhaul prior to moving east. On 12 June, III. Gruppe was ordered to transfer to a forward airfield at Sobolewo. On 21 June, the Geschwaderkommodore (wing commander) of JG 53 and its Gruppenkommandeure were summoned to nearby Suwałki, where Generalfeldmarschall (field marshal) Albert Kesselring gave the final instructions for the upcoming attack. Hauptmann Wolf-Dietrich Wilcke, the Gruppenkommandeur of III. Gruppe, briefed his pilots that evening.

On 22 June, the Geschwader crossed into Soviet airspace in support of Operation Barbarossa, the invasion of the Soviet Union, which opened the Eastern Front. On 25 June 1941, JG 53 was relocated with III. Gruppe arriving at Vilnius at 08:30. The same day, Schramm claimed four Ilyushin DB-3 bombers shot down. Schramm claimed two further DB-3 bombers on 3 July on a combat air patrol over the advancing German ground forces. He was awarded the Knight's Cross of the Iron Cross (Ritterkreuz des Eisernen Kreuzes) on 6 August 1941 for 25 victories. Both Schramm and Wilcke were decorated by Generalfeldmarschall Kesselring on 9 August 1941.

On 4 September, III. Gruppe moved to an airfield named Ossijaki located near Gomel. Here on 10 September, Schramm made an emergency landing at Ossijaki following engine failure of his Bf 109 F-2 "black 3+I". In early October, III. Gruppe was withdrawn from the Eastern Front, relocating to Mannheim-Sandhofen. The air elements left on 4 October with the ground elements travelling by train, arriving in Mannheim-Sandhofen on 13 October.

=== Mediterranean theater and instructor ===
At Mannheim-Sandhofen, III. Gruppe was equipped with the then new Bf 109 F-4. On 8 November, the Gruppe moved to Husum in northern Germany where they stayed until 14 November. They were then ordered to relocate to the Mediterranean theater in Sicily. The ground elements arrived at Catania Airfield on 28 November followed by the air elements two days later. On 12 February 1942, Schramm claimed his 39th and only aerial victory in the Mediterranean theater. That day, III. Gruppe intercepted three Bristol Beaufighter aircraft near Pantelleria on a transfer flight to Malta. The aircraft were misidentified and referred to as Bristol Blenheim bombers. In this encounter, Schramm shot down the Beaufighter T4879 from No. 248 Squadron. On 23 February, Schramm was awarded the Honor Goblet of the Luftwaffe (Ehrenpokal der Luftwaffe).

In April 1942, Schramm was posted to Ergänzungs-Jagdgruppe Süd (Supplementary Fighter Group, South) as an instructor. There on 13 July, he was injured in a flight accident when making an emergency landing. Following his convalescence, Schramm was posted to the Blindflugschule 10 (school for instrument flight training) in Altenburg. This training unit was later redesignated and became Jagdgeschwader 110 (JG 110—110th Fighter Wing). During this assignment, Schramm was promoted to Oberleutnant (first lieutenant) on 1 November 1942.

=== Squadron leader and death ===
II./JG 27 emblem

On 13 August 1943, Schramm was appointed Staffelkapitän (squadron leader) of 5. Staffel of Jagdgeschwader 27 (JG 27—27th Fighter Wing), succeeding Hauptmann Fritz Schiffke. This squadron was subordinated to II. Gruppe of JG 27 commanded by Hauptmann Werner Schröer. The Gruppe had recently back ordered back to Germany from the Mediterranean theater. At first ordered to Wiesbaden-Erbenheim Airfield, where they arrived on 9 August, the unit then moved to Eschborn Airfield on 20 August. There, the Gruppe received new Bf 109 G-6 aircraft and replacement pilots and trained for defense of the Reich missions against the United States Army Air Forces (USAAF). II. Gruppe was ordered to Saint-Dizier Airfield in France on 12 September. On 14 October during the second Schweinfurt raid, On 1 November 1943 at 13:28, II. Gruppe was scrambled at Saint-Dizier and intercepted approximately 150 USAAF bombers without escorting fighter protection shortly after 14:00 over the Palatinate. During this aerial battle, Luftwaffe pilots of II. Gruppe claimed nine bombers shot down, including a Boeing B-17 Flying Fortress bomber near Saint-Avold by Schramm for his 40th aerial victory. The Gruppe returned to Wiesbaden-Erbenheim Airfield on 18 November. The USAAF attacked Bremen on 29 November. Defending against this attack, Schramm claimed an Herausschuss (separation shot)—a severely damaged heavy bomber forced to separate from its combat box which was counted as an aerial victory—over a B-17. The next day, the USAAF VIII Bomber Command dispatched 381 bombers to attack Solingen. Near Cologne, Schramm was credited with an Herausschuss over a B-17.

On 1 December 1943, intercepting bombers en route to Cologne, Schramm was killed in action following aerial combat west of Eupen near Verviers by a Republic P-47 Thunderbolt fighter. He bailed out of his Bf 109 G-6 (Werknummer 410291—factory number) at low altitude and his parachute failed to deploy. Command of 5. Staffel was then passed to Oberleutnant Karl-Heinz Bendert. Eberhard Schade, a pilot in 5. Staffel, was tasked with Schramm's recovery and burial. At the time, it was forbidden to bury pilots in Germany who were killed in action outside of Germany. In consequence, Schramm was scheduled for burial in Saint-Trond, Belgium. However, Schade convinced the responsible authorities and Schramm received a military funeral in his hometown Wetzlar. He was posthumously awarded the Knight's Cross of the Iron Cross with Oak Leaves (Ritterkreuz des Eisernen Kreuzes mit Eichenlaub) on 11 February 1945, the 736th officer or soldier of the Wehrmacht so honored, and promoted to Hauptmann (captain).

== Summary of career ==
=== Aerial victory claims ===
According to Obermaier, Schramm was credited with 42 aerial victories, 14 over the Western Front and 28 over the Eastern Front, claimed in 480 combat missions. Mathews and Foreman, authors of Luftwaffe Aces – Biographies and Victory Claims, researched the German Federal Archives and found records for 40 aerial victory claims, plus five further unconfirmed claims. This figure includes 28 aerial victories on the Eastern Front and 12 over the Western Allies, including three four-engined heavy bombers.

Chronicle of aerial victories
This and the – (dash) indicates unconfirmed aerial victory claims for which Schramm did not receive credit. This along with the * (asterisk) indicates an Herausschuss (separation shot)—a severely damaged heavy bomber forced to separate from his combat box which was counted as an aerial victory. This and the ? (question mark) indicates information discrepancies listed by Prien, Stemmer, Rodeike, Bock, Mathews and Foreman.
Claim	Date	Time	Type	Location	Claim	Date	Time	Type	Location
– 7. Staffel of Jagdgeschwader 53 – Battle of France — 10 May – 25 June 1940
—	14 May 1940	—	M.S.406	Sedan	1	27 May 1940	14:15	M.S.406	10 km (6.2 mi) south of Creil
– 7. Staffel of Jagdgeschwader 53 – At the Channel and over England — 26 June 1940 – 7 June 1941
2	2 September 1940	17:50	Spitfire? (Note: According to Mathews and Foreman claimed as a Hawker Hurricane.)	northeast of Dungeness	7	5 October 1940	18:40	Hurricane	Thames Estuary
3	15 September 1940	12:50	Spitfire		8	17 October 1940	11:00	Spitfire	Dungeness
4	26 September 1940	13:16	Hampden		—	16 April 1941	12:00	Spitfire	English Channel
5	30 September 1940	14:38	Spitfire	London	—	16 April 1941	—	Spitfire	English Channel
6	30 September 1940	14:55? (Note: According to Mathews and Foreman claimed at 14:50.)	Spitfire						
– 8. Staffel of Jagdgeschwader 53 – Operation Barbarossa — 22 June – 4 October 1941
9? (Note: According to Mathews and Foreman this claim is unconfirmed.)	22 June 1941	09:44	DI-6	north of Kalvarija	24	5 August 1941	04:39	Pe-2	
10	22 June 1941	16:40	DB-3		25	5 August 1941	14:51	Pe-2	
11	25 June 1941	10:55	DB-3		26	20 August 1941	14:41	I-18? (Note: According to Mathews and Foreman claimed as a Polikarpov I-16.)	
12	25 June 1941	11:00	DB-3		27	20 August 1941	14:44	Pe-2	northwest of Frolovo
13	25 June 1941	13:05	DB-3		28	23 August 1941	12:27	DB-3	
14	25 June 1941	17:21	DB-3		—	23 August 1941	—	I-18 (MiG-1)	
15	3 July 1941	18:40	DB-3		29	26 August 1941	16:36	I-15	
16	3 July 1941	18:43	DB-3		30	26 August 1941	16:40	R-5	
17	6 July 1941	17:24	DB-3		31	29 August 1941	16:10	I-18 (MiG-1)	north of Nikolino
18	6 July 1941	17:35	DB-3		32	30 August 1941	13:32	I-15	
19	9 July 1941	10:10	Pe-2? (Note: According to Mathews and Foreman claimed as a Ilyushin DB-3.)		33	7 September 1941	13:43	I-15	
20	13 July 1941	10:05	DB-3		34	9 September 1941	09:05	I-16	
21	14 July 1941	14:30	DB-3		35	9 September 1941	15:54	I-17 (MiG-1)	
22	26 July 1941	10:03	DB-3		36	10 September 1941	06:40	I-17 (MiG-1)	
23	27 July 1941	07:18	I-15	north-northeast of Werchino	37	10 September 1941	10:10	I-15	
– 8. Staffel of Jagdgeschwader 53 – Mediterranean Theater — 25 November 1941 – 13 July 1942
38	12 February 1942	18:23	Blenheim						
– 5. Staffel of Jagdgeschwader 27 – Defense of the Reich — 13 August – 1 December 1943
39	14 October 1943	15:47	B-17	Bischendorf	40	30 November 1943	12:35	B-17*	Cologne
— ? (Note: According to Mathews and Foreman this claim is confirmed.)	29 November 1943	15:15	B-17*	southwest of Bremen					

=== Awards ===
- Iron Cross (1939)
  - 2nd Class (20 April 1940)
  - 1st Class (13 September 1940)
- Honor Goblet of the Luftwaffe on 23 February 1942 as Leutnant and pilot
- Knight's Cross of the Iron Cross with Oak Leaves
  - Knight's Cross on 6 August 1941 as Leutnant and Flugzeugführer in the III./Jagdgeschwader 53
  - 736th Oak Leaves on 11 February 1945 as Oberleutnant and Staffelkapitän of the 5./Jagdgeschwader 27
