= Gerhard Homuth =

World War II Luftwaffe fighter ace

- Homuth as an officer
- Born: 20 September 1914; Kiel, German Empire
- Died: 2 August 1943 (aged 28) near Oryol
- Cause of death: Killed in action
- Military career
- Allegiance: Nazi Germany
- Branch: Luftwaffe
- Service years: 1933–1943
- Rank: Major (major)
- Units: LG 2, JG 27, JG 54
- Commands: 3./JG 27, I./JG 27, I./JG 54
- Conflicts: World War II
- Awards: Knight's Cross of the Iron Cross

Gerhard Homuth (20 September 1914 – 2 August 1943) was a World War II Luftwaffe fighter ace. He scored all but two of his 63 victories against the Western Allies whilst flying the Messerschmitt Bf 109, and was one of the top scoring aces in the North African campaign.

Born in Kiel, Homuth grew up in the Weimar Republic. He joined the military service in the Reichsmarine before transferring to the Luftwaffe in 1935. Trained as a fighter pilot, he was posted Lehrgeschwader 2 (LG 2—2nd Demonstration Wing) where he flew with the aerobatics team. In October 1939, Homuth was posted Jagdgeschwader 27 (JG 27—27th Fighter Wing). In February 1940, he was appointed squadron leader of 3. Staffel (3rd squadron) of JG 27. He claimed his first aerial victory on 11 May 1940 during the Battle of France. In early 1941, his unit was transferred to North Africa where he was awarded the Knight's Cross of the Iron Cross on 14 June 1941 following his 22nd aerial victory. In June 1942, Homuth was appointed group commander of I. Gruppe (1st group) of JG 27. In late 1942, Homuth fell ill and was taken off operational flying. Following his convalesance, he served as an instructor for Bulgarian fighter pilots. On 1 August 1943, Homuth was given command of I. Gruppe of Jagdgeschwader 54 (JG 54—54th Fighter Wing) which was fighting on Eastern Front. The following day, he was posted as missing in action when he was shot down and likely killed in action near Kromy.

== Early life and career ==
Homuth was born 20 September 1914 in Kiel, at the time in the Province of Schleswig-Holstein, a province of the Kingdom of Prussia. (Note: His older brother was killed in action in 1942 on the Eastern Front, his father was shot by looting soldiers on 23 April 1945.) He joined the Reichsmarine before transferring to the Luftwaffe in 1935. In late 1938, I. (leichte Jagd) Gruppe, the light fighter group, of Lehrgeschwader 2 (LG 2—2nd Demonstration Wing) was created at Graz Airfield. With this Gruppe, Homuth was appointed chief of the Stabskompanie (staff company). Homuth had been a member of LG 2's aerobatics team which was equipped with the Bücker Bü 133 Jungmeister. The team's first public appearance was on 10 May 1938 on account of a demonstration to the Belgian Air Component at Arlon.

== World War II ==
World War II in Europe began on Friday, 1 September 1939, when German forces invaded Poland. In preparation for the invasion, I.(J)/LG 2 had deployed to an airfield at Malzkow, present-day Malczkowo. The Gruppe supported the 4th Army as part of Army Group North.

On 1 October 1939, the new I. Gruppe (1st group) of Jagdgeschwader 27 (JG 27—27th Fighter Wing) was created at Münster-Handorf Airfield and placed under command of Hauptmann Helmut Riegel. Homuth was transferred and served as Gruppen-Adjutant, the adjutant to Riegel, supporting him in the creation of the Gruppe. On 22 January 1940, the Gruppe moved to Krefeld Airfield where they were tasked with flying fighter protection during the "Phoney War" along the German – Belgian border. During this period, the pilots had little to no enemy contact. On 1 February, Homuth was appointed Staffelkapitän (squadron leader) of 3. Staffel of JG 27, replacing Oberleutnant Gerhard Rutsch in this capacity. In consequence, Oberleutnant Günther Bode was appointed Gruppen-Adjutant. In late March, I. Gruppe moved to an airfield at Mönchengladbach. In April, Homuth was briefly assigned to III. Gruppe of Jagdgeschwader 53 (JG 53—53rd Fighter Wing) which was commanded by Hauptmann Werner Mölders. Mölders' III./JG 53 was stationed further south on the German – French border and had already been engaged in aerial combat with Armée de l'air (French Air Force) and the Royal Air Force (RAF) of the British Expeditionary Force. The idea behind this assignment was to provide Homuth, and other Luftwaffe pilots, some combat experience.

=== Battle of France and Britain ===
On 10 May 1940, German forces launched the invasion of France and the Low Countries (Fall Gelb). At the start of the invasion, I. Gruppe of JG 27 was subordinated to the VIII. Fliegerkorps (8th Air Corps). The next day, Homuth claimed his first victory on 11 May, shooting down a Bristol Blenheim bomber in the late afternoon. That day, I. Gruppe operated in the area of Maastricht. The following day, 3. Staffel intercepted eight low flying Blenheim bombers on a mission to bomb the bridges crossing the Meuse and Albert Canal near Veldwezelt. Defending against this attack, Homuth shot down one of the Blenheim bombers. His opponent likely belonged to the RAF No. 110 Squadron. On 18 May, I. Gruppe moved to Charleville located approximately 15 kilometers (9.3 miles) west-northwest of Sedan. The next day, Homuth claimed a Hawker Hurricane fighter shot down. On 22 May, the Gruppe moved to Guise. Three days later, they were ordered to Saint-Omer for combat against the encircled Allied forces fighting in the Battle of Dunkirk. Prior to the relocation, Homuth shot down a Blenheim bomber, his fourth aerial victory. The Gruppe returned to Guise on 31 May.

The Gruppe predominately patrolled the area along the Somme on 1 and 2 June. On a combat air patrol to Dunkirk on 2 June, Homuth claimed two Supermarine Spitfire fighters shot down. On 5 June, German forces launched Fall Rot (Case Red), the second phase of the conquest of France. That day in the vicinity of Compiègne, Homuth claimed two Morane-Saulnier M.S.406 fighters shot down. One of the M.S.406 fighters may have been piloted by Sous lieutenant René Pomier Layrargues from Groupe de Chasse II/7, who was killed in action. Layrargues was the pilot who had shot down Hauptmann Werner Mölders from III. Gruppe of JG 53 that day and who was captured and taken prisoner of war. The Gruppe relocated again on 11 June, this time to an airfield near Soisson-Saconin-et-Breuil. On 14 June, Homuth claimed his last and ninth aerial victory of the Battle of France when he shot down a Bloch MB.131 bomber near Léchelle. When the Armistice of 22 June 1940 was signed, Homuth was one of the leading fighter pilots of I. Gruppe of JG 27. On 28 June, the Gruppe was ordered to Neuenlander Feld in Bremen for a brief period of rest and replenishment.

In preparation in what would become the Battle of Britain, I. Gruppe was moved to the English Channel on 2 July where they were based at an airfield near Plumetot. On 20 July, I. Gruppe escorted a number of Junkers Ju 87 dive bombers on a Kanalkampf mission against Convoy Bosom to the Isle of Purbeck. On this mission, Homuth claimed two Spitfire fighters shot down near Swanage. On 12 August, JG 27 escorted bombers to Portsmouth, claiming two aerial victories, including a Spitfire fighter by Homuth near Bembridge. On 1 October, I. Gruppe was withdrawn from the English Channel and had relocated to an airfield at Stade in Northern Germany. Here the Gruppe was subordinated to the Geschwaderstab (headquarters unit) of Jagdgeschwader 1 (JG 1—1st Fighter Wing) and tasked with patrolling the German Bight. This assignment ended on 21 October, when the Gruppe was ordered to relocate to Dinan in northwestern France.

=== Invasion of Greece and North Africa ===
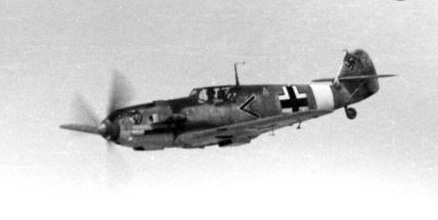
A Bf 109 E of I./JG 27 similar to those flown by Homuth

On 3 December 1940, I. Gruppe was again withdrawn from the English Channel and relocated to Döberitz located approximately 10 kilometers (6.2 miles) west of Staaken. There, the pilots were sent on home leave, returning in January 1941. In February, the Gruppe began preparations for Operation Marita, the German invasion of Greece while the ground elements of the Gruppe began their relocation to Tripoli in North Africa, arriving there on 18 March. There, the ground crew began preparations for the air elements to arrive at the designated airfield at Ayn al-Ġazāla. In parallel, the air elements of I. Gruppe relocated to Munich-Riem Airfield in early March. Credited with fifteen aerial victories, Homuth was the leading fighter pilot of I. Gruppe at the time. There, the Gruppe received refurbished Messerschmitt Bf 109 E-7 fighter aircraft. The aircraft had been equipped with a sand-filter on the front of the supercharger intake which made the aircraft more suitable for deployment in North Africa. On 4 April, the Gruppe was ordered to move to Graz Airfield for Operation Marita. German forces launched the attack on 6 April. The orders for I. Gruppe that day were to attack and destroy the Yugoslavian air defenses in the area of Laibach, present-day Ljubljana in Slovenia. Leading 3. Staffel, Homuth was given the order to attack the airfield at Laibach where they came under heavy anti-aircraft artillery fire. The Staffel attacked the hangars and inflicted damage on parked Potez 25 aircraft. Following Operation Marita, the air elements briefly returned to Munich-Riem before they transferred to North Africa, arriving in Ayn al-Ġazāla between 18 and 22 April 1941.

Homuth claimed his first aerial victory over North Africa on 1 May 1941. That day his Staffel escorted Ju 87 dive bombers on a bombing mission to Tobruk. The Luftwaffe force was intercepted by six Hurricane fighters near Tobruk. In this aerial engagement, the Luftwaffe claimed four aerial victories, including two Hurricanes by Homuth shot down taking his total to 17 aerial victories. On 5 May, then again on 8 May, Homuth shot down a Martin Maryland bomber, the latter claimed as a Blenheim bomber. On 15 May, British forces launched Operation Brevity aimed at the Axis front-line forces in the Sollum–Capuzzo–Bardia area of the border between Egypt and Libya. I. Gruppe was dispatched to the combat area near Sollum and the Halfaya Pass where Homuth claimed a Hurricane fighter shot down. Following two Blenheim bombers shot down near Fort Capuzzo on 21 May 1941, Homuth was awarded the Knight's Cross of the Iron Cross (Ritterkreuz des Eisernen Kreuzes) on 14 June for 22 aerial victories in total. He was the first recipient of the Knight's Cross within I. Gruppe of JG 27. On 14 September, German forces sent an armored reconnaissance mission to Sidi Barrani, approximately 100 kilometers (62 miles) into Egypt. The advance was repelled by British forces. Both sides committed aerial forces resulting in eight aerial victories claimed by I. Gruppe, including a Maryland bomber and Hurricane fighter by Homuth. On 9 February 1942, Homuth claimed his 40th aerial victory over a Hurricane fighter near Al Adm. Homuth was awarded the German Cross in Gold (Deutsches Kreuz in Gold) on 9 April.

=== Group commander and death ===
On 10 June 1942, Homuth was appointed Gruppenkommandeur (group commander) of I. Gruppe of JG 27. He replaced Major Eduard Neumann who had taken command of JG 27 as Geschwaderkommodore (wing commander). Command of 3. Staffel was then handed to Oberleutnant Hans-Joachim Marseille. His 60th claim came on 27 October, when he shot down a Spitfire over Bi'r Mu'min Busak located approximately 5 kilometers (3.1 miles) west of Sidi Abdel Rahman.

On 11 November, I. Gruppe was detached from JG 27 and ordered to return to Germany. Coinciding with the withdrawal from North Africa, Homuth fell seriously ill and was on convalescence until February 1943. Command of I. Gruppe then fell to Hauptmann Heinrich Setz who took command on 12 November. In February 1943, Homuth was posted to the Luftwaffe Command in Sofia where he led the training Bulgarian fighter pilots.

On 1 August 1943, Homuth was appointed Gruppenkommandeur of I. Gruppe of Jagdgeschwader 54 (JG 54—54th Fighter Wing). He replaced Oberleutnant Hans Götz who had temporarily led the Gruppe after its former commander Major Reinhard Seiler had been wounded in combat on 6 July. At the time, I. Gruppe was based at Karachev and was fighting in the Battle of Kursk on the Eastern Front. The following day, the Gruppe flew multiple combat missions in support of German ground forces retreating in the area north and northwest of Oryol. In the early afternoon, the Gruppe escorted Ju 87 dive bombers to the combat area near Kromy. Homuth failed to return from this mission and was posted missing in action. Flying Focke-Wulf Fw 190 A-6 (Werknummer 550436—factory number), he was shot down and likely killed in action 20 kilometers (12 miles) south of Kromy. Command of the Gruppe was then again given to Götz who was killed in action two days later.

== Summary of career ==
=== Aerial victory claims ===
According to Obermaier, Homuth was credited with 63 victories claimed in approximately 450 missions, 47 in Africa. He recorded two victories over the Eastern Front. Mathews and Foreman, authors of Luftwaffe Aces — Biographies and Victory Claims, researched the German Federal Archives and found records for 62 aerial victory claims, all of which claimed over the Western Allies on the Western Front or in North Africa.

Chronicle of aerial victories
This and the ? (question mark) indicates information discrepancies listed by Prien, Stemmer, Rodeike, Bock, Mathews, and Foreman.
Claim	Date	Time	Type	Location	Claim	Date	Time	Type	Location
– 3. Staffel of Jagdgeschwader 27 – Battle of France — 10 May – 25 June 1940
1	11 May 1940	17:30	Blenheim	Diest	6	2 June 1940	09:25	Spitfire	southwest of Dunkirk
2	12 May 1940	06:20	Blenheim	Liège	7	5 June 1940	18:15	M.S.406	Beauvais
3	19 May 1940	16:30	Hurricane	north of Albert	8	5 June 1940	18:20	M.S.406	3 km (1.9 mi) southeast of Troissy
4	25 May 1940	12:30	Blenheim	west of Calais	9	14 June 1940? (Note: According to Mathews and Foreman claimed on 13 June 1940.)	20:15	MB.131	Léchelle
5	2 June 1940	09:20	Spitfire	5 km (3.1 mi) southwest of Dunkirk					
– 3. Staffel of Jagdgeschwader 27 – Action at the Channel and over England — 26 June – 3 December 1940
10	20 July 1940	14:25	Spitfire	west of Swanage	13	3 September 1940	11:35	Hurricane	Burnham
11	20 July 1940	14:28	Spitfire	west of Swanage	14	11 September 1940	18:10	Hurricane	5 km (3.1 mi) southwest of Selsey Bill
12	12 August 1940	12:50	Spitfire	Bembridge	15	30 September 1940	18:10	Spitfire	south of Eastbourne
– 3. Staffel of Jagdgeschwader 27 – Sicily, Balkans and North Africa — 4 December 1940 – 31 May 1941
16	1 May 1941	09:15	Hurricane	20 km (12 mi) south of Tobruk	23	30 August 1941	17:30	Blenheim	Sallum
17	1 May 1941	09:20	Hurricane	Tobruk airfield	24	14 September 1941	17:45	Martin 167	south of El Sofafi
18	5 May 1941	08:32	Martin 167	10 km (6.2 mi) east-southeast of Fort Acroma	25	14 September 1941	17:48	Hurricane	southeast of El Sofafi
19	8 May 1941	10:10	Blenheim	100 km (62 mi) east-northeast of Tobruk	26	24 September 1941	14:40	P-40	Sidi Omar
20	15 May 1941	12:15	Hurricane	Sallum	27	24 September 1941	16:47	Hurricane	Buq Buq
21	21 May 1941	07:57	Blenheim	southeast of Fort Capuzzo	28	27 September 1941	10:10	Hurricane	5 km (3.1 mi) southeast of Ras Azaz
22	21 May 1941	07:58	Blenheim	southeast of Fort Capuzzo					
– 3. Staffel of Jagdgeschwader 27 – In North Africa — 18 November 1941 – 10 June 1942
29	5 December 1941	15:35	Hurricane		40	9 February 1942	10:51	Hurricane	south of Al Adm
30	9 December 1941	14:15	P-40	south of Kambut	41	21 February 1942	12:11	P-40	20 km (12 mi) southeast of Ayn al-Ġazāla
31	13 December 1941	16:15	P-40	southwest of Tmimi	42	27 February 1942	12:10	P-40	northeast of Fort Acroma
32	23 December 1941	14:00	Beaufighter	southeast of Arco Philaenorum	43	2 March 1942	10:51	P-40	west of Tobruk
33	23 December 1941	14:10	Beaufighter	southeast of Arco Philaenorum	44	2 March 1942	10:52	P-40	southeast of Fort Acroma
34	3 January 1942	08:20	P-40	northeast of Ajdabiya	? (Note: This claim is not listed by Prien, Stemmer, Rodeike and Bock.)	2 March 1942	12:11	P-40	20 km (12 mi) southeast of Ayn al-Ġazāla
35	7 January 1942	12:15	P-40	northeast of Ajdabiya	45	2 April 1942	18:07	P-40	30 km (19 mi) north of Fort Acroma
36	7 January 1942	12:20	P-40	30 km (19 mi) northeast of Ajdabiya	46	6 April 1942	09:10	Hurricane	northwest of Tmimi
37	9 January 1942	14:15	P-40	Marsa al-Brega	47	7 April 1942	08:37	P-46	southwest of Ayn al-Ġazāla
38	9 January 1942	14:20	P-40	10 km (6.2 mi) north of Gadd el Ahmar	48	23 May 1942	11:18	Boston	north of Fort Acroma
39	8 February 1942	14:32	P-40	east of Bomba Bight					
– Stab I. Gruppe of Jagdgeschwader 27 – In North Africa — 10 June – November 1942
49	25 July 1942	17:45	Hurricane	west of El Dabaa	56	29 August 1942	08:55	P-40	15 km (9.3 mi) southeast of Abu Dweis
50	27 July 1942	12:25	Hurricane	southeast of El Hammam	57	2 September 1942	16:10	P-46 (P-40)	southwest of El Hammam
51	27 July 1942	12:27	Hurricane	southeast of El Hammam	58	7 September 1942	17:42	P-40	southeast of El Alamein
52	27 July 1942	12:28	Hurricane	southeast of El Hammam; 5 km (3.1 mi) south of El Alamein	59	15 September 1942	16:54	P-40	southwest of El Alamein
53	7 August 1942	09:35	Hurricane	north-northwest of El Alamein	60	27 October 1942	15:15	Spitfire	south of Bi'r Mu'min Busak
54	7 August 1942	09:37	P-40	north of El Alamein north of El Hammam	61	2 November 1942	12:06	P-46 (P-40)	southeast of Bi'r Mu'min Busak
55	18 August 1942	09:38	P-40	west of El Alamein					

=== Awards ===
- Iron Cross (1939) 2nd and 1st Class
- Knight's Cross of the Iron Cross on 14 June 1941 Oberleutnant and Staffelkapitän of the 3./Jagdgeschwader 27
- German Cross in Gold on 9 April 1942 as Oberleutnant in the I./Jagdgeschwader 27
