= Soisson =

Soisson is a surname. Notable people with the surname include:

- Gérard Soisson (1935–1983), Luxembourgish banker at the center of the Clearstream Affair
- Guillaume Soisson (1866–1938), Luxembourgian engineer and politician
- Jacques Soisson (1928–2012), French artist, child and adolescent psychotherapist
- Jean-Pierre Soisson (born 1934), French politician
- Joel Soisson, American screenwriter, producer and director
- Renaud III, Count of Soisson (died 1141), French aristocrat

== See also ==
- Soisson-Rapacz-Clason Field, a multipurpose stadium in Kalamazoo, Michigan, US
- Soissons
