= Jagdgeschwader 104 =

- Active: 20 March 1943 – 28 April 1945
- Country: Nazi Germany
- Branch: Luftwaffe
- Type: Fighter Aircraft
- Role: Fighter pilot training wing
- Size: Air Force Wing

Commanders
- Notable commanders: Reinhard Seiler

Jagdgeschwader 104 (JG 104) was a Luftwaffe fighter-training-wing of World War II.

It was formed at Fürth-Herzogenaurach from Stab/Jagdfliegerschule 4 (JFS 4) in March 1943. It was then stationed at Roth from 6 April 1944 until it was disbanded on 28 April 1945. Some of its commanding officers included Major Reinhard Seiler and Major Rolf Hermichen.
