= Operation Sonnenblume =

Dispatch of German and Italian troops to North Africa during the Second World War

Unternehmen Sonnenblume/Operation Sunflower
- Part of The Western Desert campaign of the Second World War
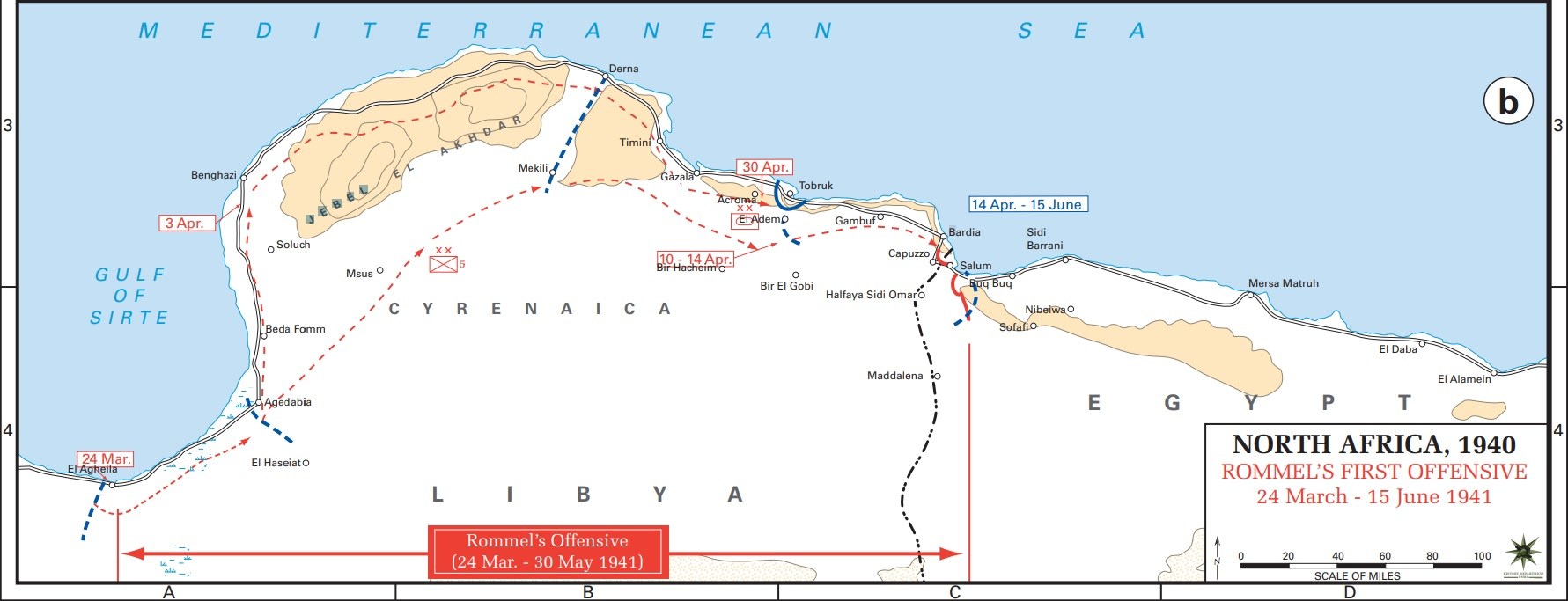
- Map showing the area and events of Operation Sonnenblume
Date	6 February – 25 May 1941
Location	Cyrenaica, Libya 27°N 17°E
Result	Axis victory
Territorial changes	Cyrenaica re-captured by Axis, Siege of Tobruk

Belligerents
Italy; Germany	British Empire; India; Australia; Free France

Commanders and leaders
(Kingdom of Italy) Italo Gariboldi; (Nazi Germany) Erwin Rommel	Archibald Wavell; Philip Neame (POW) (6 April)

Units involved
10th Army (10ª Armata); 5th Light Afrika Division; 15th Panzer Division	Cyrenaica Command (Cyrcom); 2nd Armoured Division; 9th Australian Division

Strength
Parts of 2 German and 3 Italian divisions	2 divisions; 3 brigades; 1 armoured brigade (understrength)

Casualties and losses
103–107 tanks	3,000 captured; All tanks lost

Operation Sonnenblume (Unternehmen Sonnenblume, "Operation Sunflower") was the name given to the dispatch of German and Italian troops to North Africa in February 1941, during the Second World War. The Italian 10th Army (10ª Armata) had been destroyed by the British, Commonwealth, Empire and Allied Western Desert Force attacks during Operation Compass (9 December 1940 – 9 February 1941). The first units of the new Deutsches Afrikakorps (DAK), commanded by Generalleutnant Erwin Rommel, departed Naples for Africa and arrived on 11 February 1941. (In the English-speaking world, the term Afrika Korps became a generic term for German forces in North Africa.) On 14 February, advanced units of the 5th Light Afrika Division (later renamed the 21st Panzer Division), Aufklärungsbataillon 3 (Reconnaissance Battalion 3) and Panzerjägerabteilung 39 (Anti-tank Detachment 39) arrived at the Libyan port of Tripoli and were sent immediately to the front line east of Sirte.

Rommel arrived in Libya on 12 February, with orders to defend Tripoli and Tripolitania, albeit using aggressive tactics. General Italo Gariboldi replaced Maresciallo d'Italia (Marshal of Italy) Rodolfo Graziani as the Governor-General of Libya on 25 March and Generale d'Armata Mario Roatta, Commander in Chief of the Royal Italian Army (Regio Esercito), ordered Graziani to place Italian motorised units in Libya under the new Italian–German command. The first German troops reached Sirte on 15 February, advanced to Nofilia on 18 February and a German raiding party ambushed a British patrol near El Agheila on 24 February. On 24 March, the Axis captured El Agheila and on 31 March attacked Mersa Brega. The understrength 3rd Armoured Brigade failed to counter-attack and began to retreat towards Benghazi the next day.

When the 3rd Armoured Brigade moved, its worn-out tanks began to break down, as had been predicted. The brigade failed to prevent Axis flanking moves in the desert south of the Cyrenaican bulge, that left the Australian infantry in Benghazi with no option but to retreat up the Via Balbia. Rommel split his forces into small columns to harry the British retreat, as far as the Axis fuel and water shortage permitted. A considerable British force was captured by the Italians and Germans at Mechili, leading to the British retreat continuing to Tobruk and then on to the Libyan–Egyptian frontier. Between Mechili and Derna many prisoners were taken. Axis forces failed to capture Tobruk in the first rush and Rommel then had to divide the Axis forces between Tobruk and the frontier.

Sonnenblume succeeded because the ability of the Axis to mount an offensive was underestimated by General Archibald Wavell, the Commander in Chief Middle East, the War Office and Winston Churchill. Rommel transformed the situation by his audacity, which was unexpected, despite copious intelligence reports from the decryption of signals from the German Enigma coding machine and MI14 (British Military Intelligence). Many experienced British units had been transferred to Greece in Operation Lustre and others to Egypt to refit. Some commanders appointed by Wavell to Cyrenaica Command (CYRCOM) failed to live up to expectations and Wavell relied on maps that were found to be inaccurate, when he later arrived to see for himself. In 1949, Wavell wrote, "I had certainly not budgeted for Rommel after my experience of the Italians. I should have been more prudent...".

== Background ==
=== Italian invasion of Egypt ===
Operazione E was the plan for an Italian invasion of Egypt in 1940 to seize the Suez Canal that began the Western Desert Campaign (1940–1943). The Italians were opposed by British, Commonwealth, and Free French forces. After numerous delays, the scope of the offensive was reduced to an advance by the 10th Army (Marshal Rodolfo Graziani) into Egypt to Sidi Barrani and attacks on any British forces in the area. The 10th Army advanced about 65 mi (105 km) into Egypt but only made contact with the British screening force from the 7th Armoured Division and did not engage the main force around Mersa Matruh. On 16 September, the 10th Army halted and took up defensive positions around the port of Sidi Barrani, intending to build fortified camps, while waiting for engineers to extend the Litoranea Balbo (Via Balbia) with the Via della Vittoria. Graziani intended to use the road to accumulate supplies for an advance on Mersa Matruh, about 80 mi (130 km) further east, where the remainder of the 7th Armoured Division and the 4th Indian Division were based.

=== Operation Compass ===
Map of the provinces of Libya, 1934–1963

The British Western Desert Force (WDF, Lieutenant-General Sir Richard O'Connor) attacked the 10th Army in western Egypt and Cyrenaica, the eastern province of Libya from December 1940 to February 1941. The WDF, with about 30,000 men, advanced from Mersa Matruh in Egypt for a five-day raid against the 10th Army. The Italian force had about 150,000 men in fortified posts around Sidi Barrani and further west, over the border in Cyrenaica. The 10th Army was swiftly defeated, Sidi Barrani and Sollum were re-captured, and the British continued the operation, attacking through Cyrenaica to capture Bardia, Tobruk, and Derna. The British then pursued the 10th Army along the Via Balbia around the Jebel Akhdar (Green Mountain) towards the western province of Tripolitania. Combe Force, an ad hoc flying column, moved through the desert south of the Jebel and intercepted the last organised units of the 10th Army at the Battle of Beda Fomm. The WDF then chased the remnants of the 10th Army to El Agheila on the Gulf of Sidra. The British captured 138,000 Italian and Libyan prisoners, hundreds of tanks, and over 1,000 guns and aircraft, while suffering only 1,900 casualties, killed or wounded.

The British were unable to continue beyond El Agheila, due to supply difficulty and worn-out vehicles. In February 1941, the British War Cabinet decided to hold Cyrenaica with the minimum of forces and send the remainder to Greece. The most experienced, best-trained, and best-equipped units of the WDF were diverted to the Greek Campaign in Operation Lustre in March and April 1941. In Cyrenaica, the 6th Australian Division was up to strength but the vehicles of the 7th Armoured Division were worn out. The 2nd New Zealand Division had two brigades available and the 6th Infantry Division in Egypt had no artillery and was training for operations in the Dodecanese Islands. The 7th Australian Division (Major-General John Lavarack) and the 9th Australian Division were poorly-equipped and still training, a Polish Brigade Group was short of equipment and two armoured regiments, detached from the 2nd Armoured Division to the 7th Armoured Division, had also been worn out in the later stages of Operation Compass. The rest of the division had two cruiser tank regiments whose tanks had worn-out tracks and two light tank regiments; the divisional commander had died suddenly and been replaced by Major-General Michael Gambier-Parry.

==== Siege of Giarabub ====
The Siege of Giarabub (now Jaghbub), took place in the aftermath of the defeat of the 10th Army. The fortified Italian position at the Al Jaghbub Oasis was besieged by parts of the 6th Australian Division. The 6th Australian Divisional Cavalry Regiment began the siege in December 1940, leaving the Italian garrison dependent for supplies on the Regia Aeronautica (the Italian Royal Air Force). Air transport proved insufficient and hunger prompted many of the locally recruited troops to desert. After being reinforced by the 2/9th Australian Battalion and a battery of the 4th Royal Horse Artillery, the Australians attacked on 17 March 1941 and forced the Italian garrison to surrender on 21 March.

=== Terrain ===
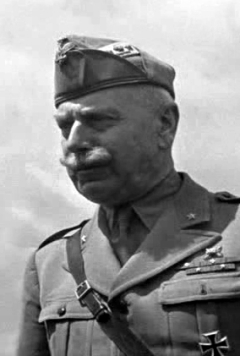
General Italo Gariboldi, supreme commander of Italian forces in Libya

The war was fought primarily in the Western Desert, which was about 240 mi (390 km) wide, from Mersa Matruh in Egypt to Gazala on the Libyan coast, along Via Balbia, the only paved road. The Sand Sea 150 mi (240 km) inland marked the southern limit of the desert at its widest at Giarabub and Siwa; in British parlance, Western Desert came to mean eastern Cyrenaica too. From the coast, extending south lies a raised, flat plain of stony desert about 500 ft (150 m) above sea level, about 120–190 mi (200–300 km) from north to south, as far as the Sand Sea. Scorpions, vipers and flies populated the region, which was inhabited by a small number of Bedouin nomads.

Bedouin tracks like the Trigh el Abd and Trigh Capuzzo, linked wells and the easier traversed ground; navigation was by sun, star, compass and "desert sense", good perception of the environment gained by experience. When Italian troops advanced into Egypt in September 1940, the Maletti Group left Sidi Omar and got lost, having to be found by reconnaissance aircraft. In spring and summer, the days are miserably hot and nights are very cold. The Sirocco (also known as Gibleh or Ghibli), a hot desert wind, blows clouds of fine sand which reduces visibility to a few yards and coats eyes, lungs, machinery, food and equipment. Motor vehicles and aircraft need special oil filters. In such barren country, supplies for military operations have to be transported from outside. German engines, particularly motorcycles, tended to overheat and tank engine life fell from 1,400–1,600 mi (2,300–2,600 km) to 300–900 mi (480–1,450 km), made worse by difficulties of maintaining diverse German and Italian motor types.

=== Supply ===
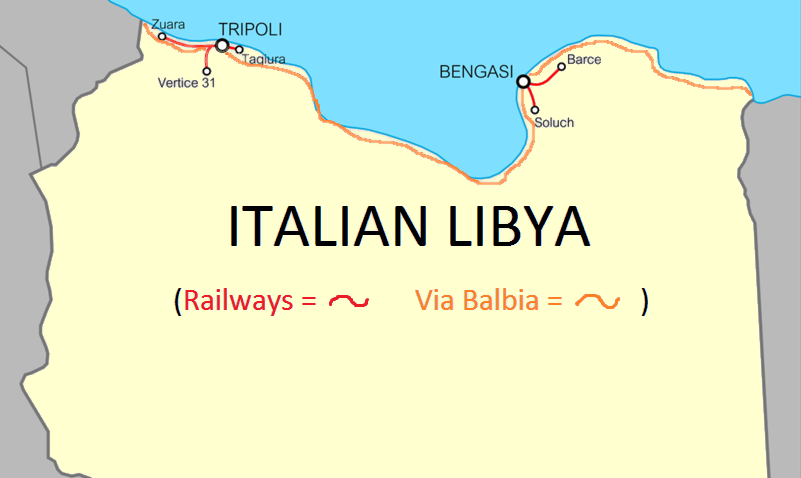
The Litoranea Balbo, renamed Via Balbia in 1940, runs the length of the Libyan coast

The normal sea route for Italian supplies to Libya went west round Sicily, then close to the coast to the port of Tripoli, to avoid interference from British aircraft, ships and submarines based at Malta; a third of the Italian merchant marine had been interned after Italy declared war and the diversion increased the voyage to about 600 mi (970 km). On land, supplies had to be carried huge distances by road or in small consignments by coaster. After the Italian defeat in Operation Compass, Tripoli was the last remaining Axis port, with a maximum unloading capacity of four troopships or five cargo ships at once, enough for the delivery of about 45,000 long tons (46,000 t) of freight per month. The distance from Tripoli to Benghazi was 405 mi (652 km) along the Via Balbia, which was only half-way to Alexandria.

The road could flood, was vulnerable to attacks by the Desert Air Force (DAF) and using desert tracks increased vehicle wear. A German motorised division needed 350 long tons (360 t) of supplies per day and moving those supplies 300 mi (480 km) was calculated to need 1,170 two-ton lorries on top of the divisions own vehicles. (Note: The Axis advance of 388 mi (624 km) from Benghazi to Sollum in Egypt during Operation Sonnenblume, increased the road distance from Tripoli to 1,100 mi (1,800 km). There was only sufficient coastal shipping to carry 15,000 long tons (15,000 t) per month and Benghazi was within range of DAF attacks so seldom achieved even 700 tons per day unloaded per. Tobruk could take about 1,500 long tons (1,500 t) of supplies per day but the Axis lack of shipping made its capture irrelevant.) With seven Axis divisions, air and naval units, 70,000 long tons (71,000 t) of supplies per month were needed. From February to May 1941, a surplus of 45,000 long tons (46,000 t) was delivered from Italy. British attacks from Malta had some effect but in May, the worst month for shipping losses, 91 per cent of the supplies arrived. Lack of transport in Libya left German supplies stranded in Tripoli, while the Italians had only 7,000 lorries for deliveries to 225,000 men. A record amount of supply arrived in June but at the front, shortages worsened. (Note: The Vichy French agreed to open the port of Bizerta in Tunisia but no supplies moved through it until late 1942.)

== Prelude ==
=== German intervention ===
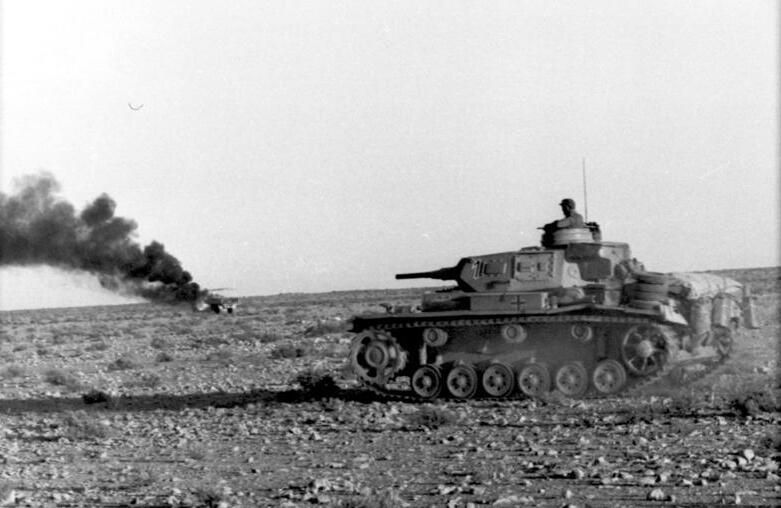
Panzer III advances past a burning vehicle in the desert, April 1941

German involvement in the western Mediterranean began with the arrival in Italy during June 1940, of General der Deutschen Luftwaffe beim Oberkommando der Königlich Italienischen Luftwaffe (Italuft), General Maximilian von Pohl), a liaison organisation to handle intelligence matters. Luftwaffe air units arrived in Italy in October, to carry Italian troops to Albania and then on 15 November, Luftflotte 2 (Generalfeldmarschall Albert Kesselring) transferred from Germany and Fliegerkorps X (General der Flieger Hans Geisler) moved from Norway to Sicily. By January 1941, Fliegerkorps X had 120 long-range bombers, 150 dive bombers, forty twin-engined fighters, and twenty reconnaissance aircraft. Fliegerkorps X took over Luftwaffe operations in southern Italy, Sicily, and part of Sardinia, and later took over in North Africa, with orders to secure the sea route from Italy to North Africa by neutralising Malta. Attacks were to be made on British supply routes to Egypt and Axis forces in North Africa were to be supported by the Fliegerführer Afrika (General Stefan Fröhlich). The first sorties of the Fliegerkorps were flown on 7 January, against a British convoy and escorts off the Algerian coast.

On 24 October 1940, after an investigation of the possibility of military operations in North Africa, General Wilhelm Ritter von Thoma reported to Adolf Hitler that supply difficulties determined what could be achieved, given the North African climate and terrain, and British control of the Mediterranean. The minimum necessary force to capture Egypt was four divisions, which was also the maximum force which could be supplied from Italy, but Hitler refused to consider sending more than one armoured division. On 12 November, Hitler issued Directive 18, ordering that a panzer division be prepared to move to North Africa. Even this was cancelled after the Italian advance into Egypt in Operazione E. After the magnitude of the Italian defeat during Operation Compass was realised, Hitler issued Directive 22 on 11 January 1941, ordering the dispatch of a Sperrverband (blocking detachment), initiating Unternehmen Sonnenblume (Operation Sunflower). On 3 February, Hitler agreed to send another panzer division to join the 5th Light Afrika Division (Generalmajor Johann von Ravenstein). The first German troops reached Libya on 14 February and the first tanks on 20 February. A panzer corps of two divisions had been recommended by General Hans von Funck after a visit to Libya in January, and by General Enno von Rintelen, the senior military attaché in Rome; Hitler agreed only to send another panzer regiment. Other elements of the 15th Panzer Division (Oberst Maximilian von Herff) began to arrive in late April.

==== Deutsches Afrikakorps ====
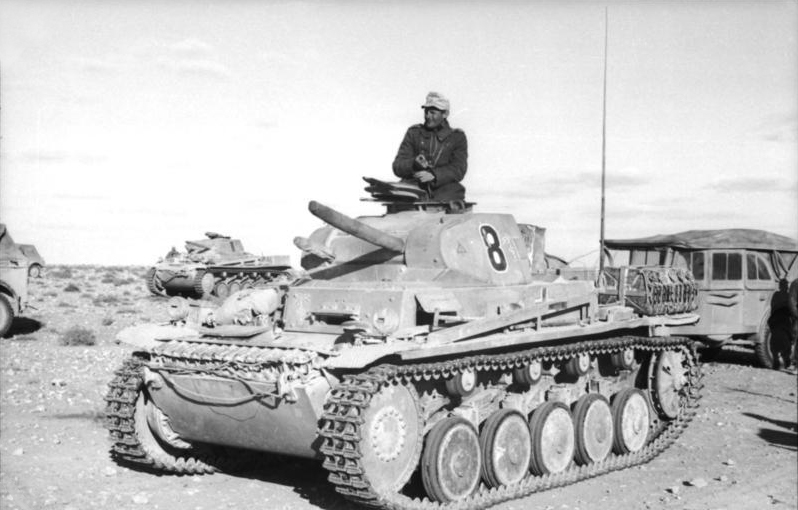
Panzer II of the 15th Panzer Division in North Africa

On 19 February, the Afrikakorps (DAK), was formed as a Sperrverband (barrier detachment) to defend Tripolitania. (Note: The term "Afrika Korps" is pseudo-German, taken from part of the German title, which was written as one word. Deutsches Afrikakorps, the initial German formation, was part of the command structure of the Axis forces in North Africa.) After the Battle of France (10 May – 25 June 1940), the Heer (German army) began bolting extra plates to its tanks and most of those in Panzer Regiment 5 and Panzer Regiment 8 were of the modified type. The tanks were also adapted for desert conditions, with better engine cooling achieved by increasing the speed of the radiator fan and by cutting holes in the hatch covers of the engine compartment. Panzer Regiment 5 of the 5th Light Afrika Division arrived in North Africa aboard two convoys from 8 to 10 March 1941.

The regiment had 155 tanks, three kleiner Panzerbefehlswagen (small command vehicles) and four Panzerbefehlswagen (command vehicles). (Note: While the tanks were being loaded onto Italian ships in the port of Naples, the Leverkusen caught fire and sank, with the loss of thirteen tanks. Ten replacement Panzer III, a mixture of Ausf (type) F and G models, were requisitioned from Panzer Regiment 6 and three new Panzer IV Ausf E were shipped to Libya from 10 to 14 April and reached the regiment on 29 April.) Another 25 Panzer I Ausf A to reinforce the regiment arrived in Tripoli on 10 May. The tanks in Panzer Regiment 5 were still painted dark grey (RAL 7021 dunkelgrau) and carried the 3rd Panzer Division emblem of an inverted Y with two strikes. On 18 January, Panzer Regiment 8 with 146 tanks, part of the 10th Panzer Division was transferred to the new 15th Panzer Division, which had been created from the 33rd Infantry Division. Panzer Regiment 8 was shipped to Libya in three convoys from 25 April to 6 May 1941 and by 28 May had completed its assembly in North Africa.

=== Axis command ===
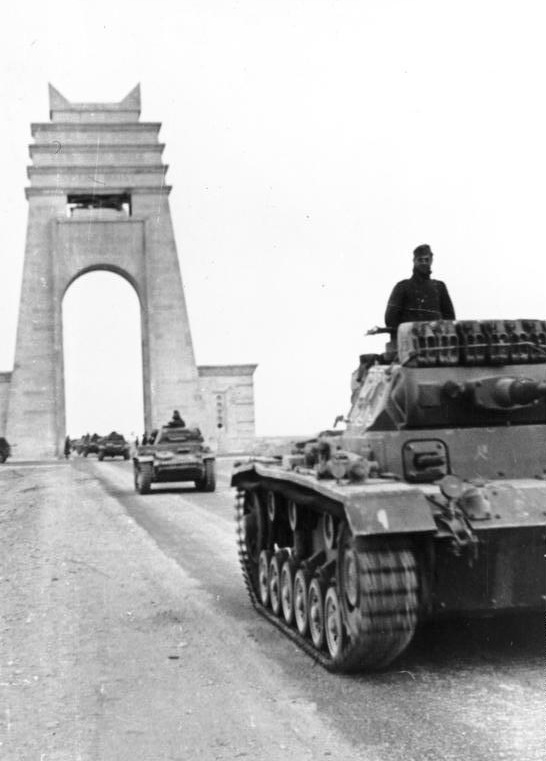
Panzer III drives past Marble Arch (Arco dei Fileni) at Ras Lanuf on the Tripolitania–Cyrenaica border, 1941

After General Giuseppe Tellera was killed on 7 February at the Battle of Beda Fomm, General Italo Gariboldi took over command of the remnants of the 10th Army and on 25 March, replaced Graziani as the Governor-General of Libya. Generalmajor Erwin Rommel was promoted to Generalleutnant, appointed to command the DAK and arrived in Libya on 12 February. Rommel had been ordered in January by the Commander in Chief of the German army, Generalfeldmarschall Walther von Brauchitsch, to defend Tripoli and Tripolitania, albeit using aggressive tactics. The Commander in Chief of the Regio Esercito Generale d'Armata Mario Roatta, put Rommel under the command of Gariboldi and ordered Gariboldi to put all Italian motorised units under the tactical command of Rommel. Rommel sent XX Corps with the 27th Infantry Division "Brescia" (Brescia Division), 17th Infantry Division "Pavia" (Pavia Division) and the last 60 tanks of the 132nd Armoured Division "Ariete" (Ariete Division) forward. Oberkommando der Wehrmacht (OKW, supreme command of the German armed forces) was intended only to stabilise the military situation in Africa. On a visit to Berlin, Rommel was told not to expect reinforcements, even after the limited advance from Tripoli, 270 mi (430 km) along the Gulf of Sirte to Sirte and then another 92 mi (148 km) on to Nofilia on 19 March.

=== CYRCOM ===
The 9th Australian Division and the 2nd Armoured Division (minus a brigade group sent to Greece), were left to garrison Cyrenaica under Cyrenaica Command (Lieutenant-General Henry Maitland Wilson), despite the inadequacy of the force if the Germans sent troops to Libya. Command in Egypt was taken over by Lieutenant-General Richard O'Connor and the XIII Corps HQ was replaced by the HQ of the 1st Australian Corps (Lieutenant-General Thomas Blamey). It was believed by General Archibald Wavell, the Commander-in-Chief Middle East and GHQ in Egypt, that the Germans could not be ready until May, by when the 2nd Armoured Division tanks would have been overhauled, two more divisions and support troops, particularly artillery, would be ready, along with the 9th Australian Division. The 2nd Armoured Division had a reconnaissance regiment; the 3rd Armoured Brigade had an understrength light tank regiment and one equipped with captured Fiat M13/40 tanks. The cruiser regiment arrived in late March, after many breakdowns en route, which brought the division up to an understrength armoured brigade. (Note: Most of the British tanks were worn out and the Italian tanks were slow and unreliable. The Support Group (equivalent to a small infantry brigade) had only a motor battalion, a 25-pounder field gun regiment, an anti-tank battery and a machine-gun company, the division was short of transport and its workshops were understaffed and lacked spare parts.) Two brigades of the 9th Australian Division were swapped with two from the 7th Australian Division, which were less well trained and were short of equipment and transport.

Attempts by the British to re-open Benghazi were frustrated by lack of transport, poor weather and the Luftwaffe which began bombing and mining of the harbour in early February. The attacks led the British to abandon attempts to use it to receive supplies and to evacuate the Italian stores and equipment captured during Operation Compass. Lack of transport made it impossible to supply a garrison west of El Agheila, the most favourable position for a defensive line and restricted the 2nd Armoured Division to movement between supply dumps, reducing its limited mobility further. In February, Lieutenant-General Philip Neame VC took over CYRCOM and predicted that many of the tanks would break down as soon as they moved. (Neame also discovered that he had to rely on the local telephone system, staffed by Italian operators.) Neame wanted a proper armoured division, two infantry divisions and adequate air support to hold the area. Wavell replied that there was little to be sent and nothing before April. In early March, the 9th Australian Division began to relieve the 6th Australian Division at Mersa Brega for Operation Lustre, which demonstrated the difficulty of tactical moves with insufficient transport. On 20 March, the Australians were withdrawn north of Benghazi to Tocra, near Er Regima for ease of supply and the 2nd Armoured Division took over.

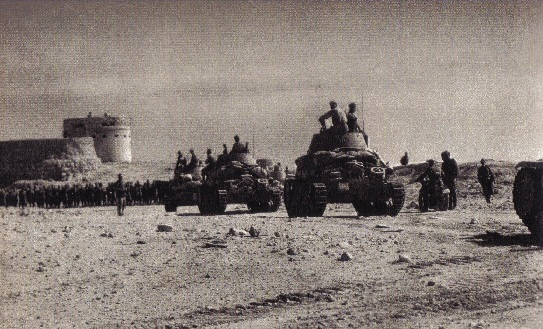
Italian tanks approaching Fort El Mechili

There were no easily defended positions between El Agheila and Benghazi, the terrain being open and good tank country. Neame was ordered to conserve the tank units as far as possible, yet inflict losses on the Axis forces if they attacked, fight a delaying action as far as Benghazi if pressed and abandon the port if necessary. There was no prospect of reinforcement before May so the high ground of the escarpment nearby and the defiles to the north near Er Regima and Barce in the Jebel Akhdar, were to be held for as long as possible. The 2nd Armoured Division would move inland south of the Jebel to Antelat and operate against the flank and rear of the Axis forces, when they moved up the coast road (Via Balbia) or cut across the desert towards Mechili and Tobruk. The tanks would have to use depots at Msus, Tecnis, Martuba, Mechili, Timimi, El Magrun and Benghazi as a substitute for lorry-borne supply. The 3rd Indian Motor Brigade (Brigadier Edward Vaughan) arrived at Martuba in late March with its transport but no tanks, artillery, anti-tank guns and only half its wireless sets, to be ready to move towards Derna, Barce or Mechili if the Axis attacked.

== Battle ==
=== 24 March – 2 April ===
Libya location map

On 24 March, Rommel advanced with the new Afrikakorps towards the positions of the British 3rd Armoured Brigade, south-east of Mersa Brega, where the 2nd Support Group held an 8 mi (13 km) front; the Australians were 150 mi (240 km) to the north, minus a brigade left at Tobruk, deficient in much equipment and out of contact with the 2nd Armoured Division. British air reconnaissance had observed German troops west of El Agheila on 25 February and by 5 March, it was expected that the German commander would consolidate the defence of Tripolitania, try to recapture Cyrenaica and then invade Egypt. The Germans were expected to use Sirte and Nofilia as bases but not before April; Rommel was identified on 8 March but local intelligence was hard to find. The mileage restrictions necessary to maintain the few troops and vehicles near the front and the danger from fast German Schwerer Panzerspähwagen (eight-wheeler heavy armoured cars) inhibited British reconnaissance units, whose armoured cars were slower and had inferior armament.

On 1 April, Rommel sent two columns to capture Mersa Brega, with Panzer Regiment 5, Machine-Gun Battalion 8, Reconnaissance Unit 3 and anti-tank guns and artillery moving along the Via Balbia as Machine-Gun Battalion 2 and some anti-tank guns made an outflanking move through the desert to the south. The British withdrew from Mersa Brega, followed up by the Germans as the Ariete Division and the Brescia Division advanced from Tripoli. The 5th Light Afrika Division was ordered on to Ajdabiya (Agedabia) and the harbour of Zuetina, despite Italian objections. Air reconnaissance on 3 April, revealed that the British were still retiring and Rommel ordered a probe around the southern flank by an Italian detachment and several German platoons were sent under Lieutenant-Colonel Gerhard von Schwerin towards Maaten el Grara, from where they were to observe the ground towards Msus, south-east of Benghazi and Ben Gania further south. Reconnaissance Unit 3 was ordered to reconnoitre towards Soluch and Ghemines; during the evening Rommel ordered them on to Benghazi.

=== 3–5 April ===
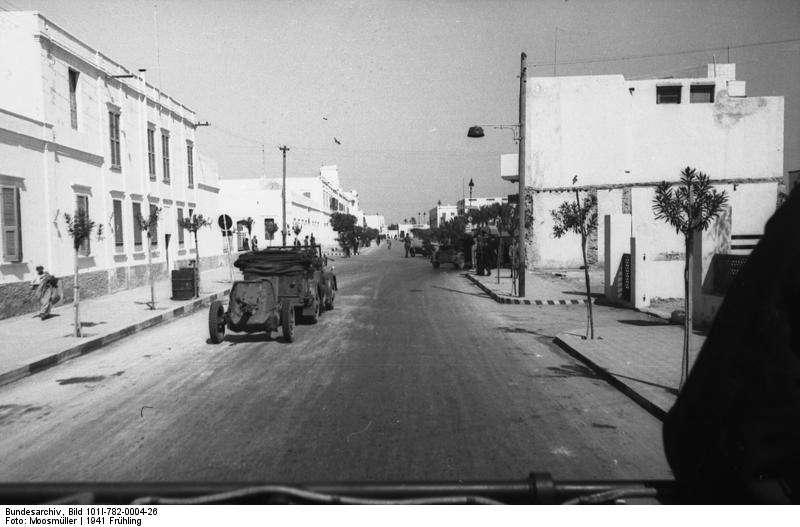
German vehicle column passing through Benghazi in March 1941.

On 3 April, Gambier-Parry had received a report that a large enemy armoured force was advancing on Msus (now Zawiyat Masus in the Fati Municipality), site of the main divisional supply dump. The 3rd Armoured Brigade (Brigadier Reginald Rimington) moved there and found that the petrol had been destroyed to prevent capture. The tank brigade had already been reduced by losses and breakdowns to 12 cruiser tanks, 20 light tanks and 20 Italian tanks. Neame received conflicting reports about the positions of the British and Axis forces and on 5 April, reports that a large Axis force was advancing on El Abiar, led him to order the 9th Australian Division back to Wadi Cuff north-east of Benghazi and the elements of the 2nd Armoured Division to guard the desert flank and retire on Mechili. Conflicting reports led Neame to countermand these orders, which caused the Australians much confusion. On 6 April, British air reconnaissance reported that there were Axis columns in the desert and the 3rd Indian Motor Brigade repulsed an attack at Mechili, which led to O'Connor at the CYRCOM headquarters (Neame had left to visit Gambier-Parry), to order a general withdrawal.

The headquarters of the 2nd Armoured Division and the 2nd Support Group were ordered back to Mechili followed by the 3rd Armoured Brigade. Rimington decided that the armoured brigade lacked the fuel to reach Mechili and ordered a move to Maraura, where a small amount of petrol was found. Rimington planned to move to Derna via Giovanni Berta to obtain more fuel; Rimington was captured with his deputy when he motored ahead. The brigade continued on and crowded the Australians, who were bypassing Derna, as they withdrew to Gazala. The Australians had collected every vehicle that could move and withdrawn at 5:00 p.m., behind extensive demolitions, covered by the 1st Battalion King's Royal Rifle Corps (1st KRRC), a motor battalion recently arrived from Egypt. (The 2/13th Australian Battalion was rushed to Martuba to block the track from Mechili and the first units of the division reached Tmimi by 4:30 a.m. on 7 April, where the 26th Australian Brigade held the town, until the division and stragglers from other units passed through.)

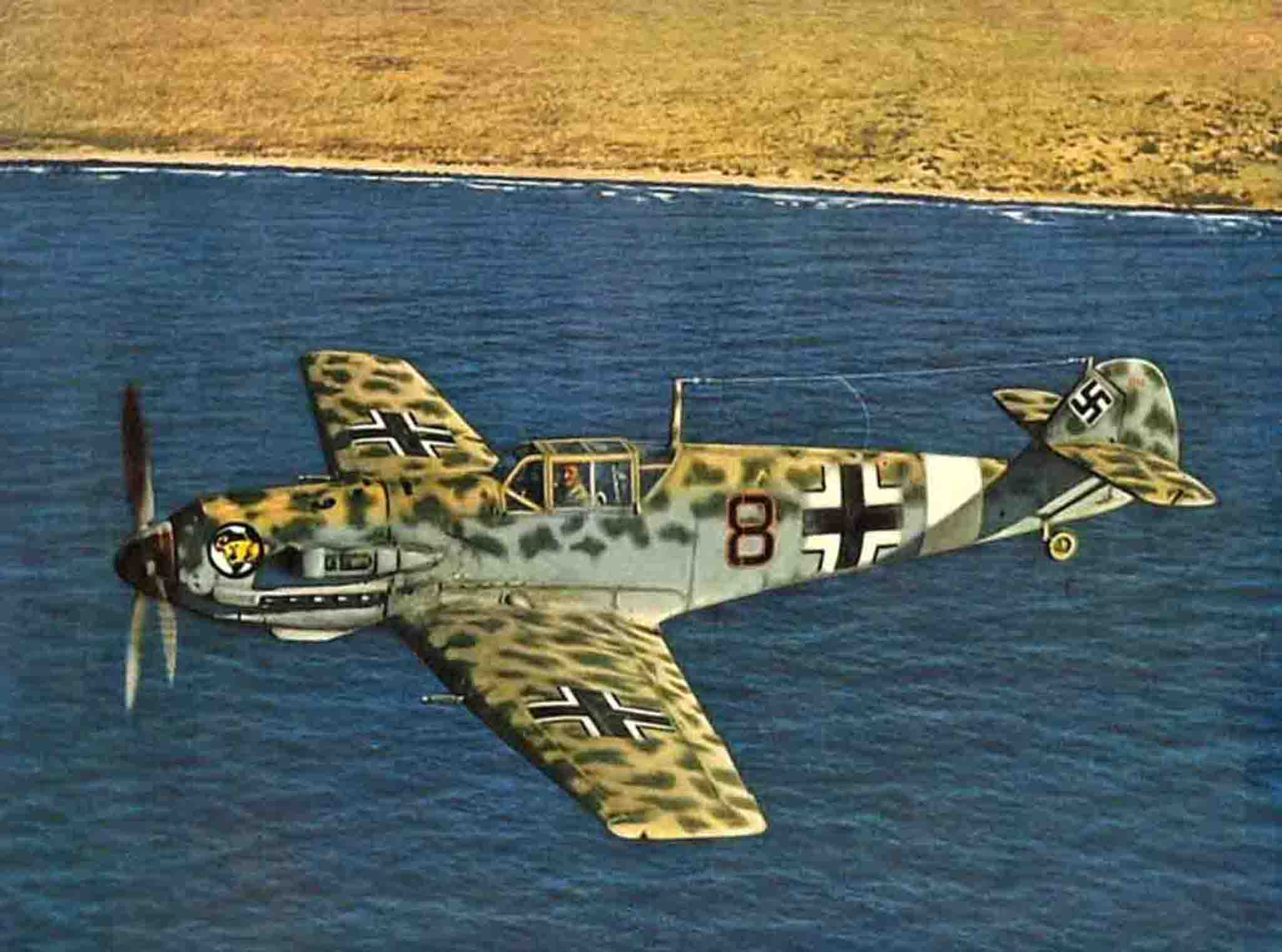
Colourised photo of a Messerschmitt Bf 109 of Jagdgeschwader 27 ("27 th fighter wing") which arrived in North Africa from April 1941

The 5th Light Afrika Division, between Agedabia and Zuetina, reported that it needed four days to refuel but Rommel ordered that every supply vehicle be unloaded and along with spare fighting vehicles, sent back 40 mi (64 km) west of El Agheila, to collect fuel within 24 hours, while the rest of the division waited. Despite more objections from Gariboldi, Rommel decided that the advance must go faster if the British were to be trapped. On the night of 3/4 April, Reconnaissance Unit 3 entered Benghazi and that morning Rommel ordered it to continue to Mechili, as soon as the Brescia Division arrived. As units reached Benghazi, Rommel formed them into columns, Group Schwerin was sent to Tmimi and Gruppe Fabris, composed of motorcyclists and the Ariete divisional artillery, to Mechili followed by the rest of the Ariete Division. General Streich, the 5th Light Afrika Division commander, was ordered on to Tobruk with Machine-Gun Battalion 8, part of Panzer Regiment 5 and an anti-tank company. Lieutenant-Colonel Olbrich, the Panzer Regiment 5 commander, was sent with Machine-Gun Battalion 2, artillery and an armoured battalion of the Ariete Division, via Msus to Mechili or on to Tmimi and Major-General Heinrich Kirchheim, who was in the area by coincidence, was shanghaied and ordered to advance with two columns along the Via Balbia and through the Jebel Akhdar with the Brescia Division.

By late on 4 April, Group Schwerin was out of fuel and stranded near Ben Gania, with the Italian contingents trailing behind and Gruppe Streich got only as far as Maaten el Grara; next day a party from Gruppe Streich reached Tengeder with the rest straggling behind for 20–30 mi (32–48 km). Reconnaissance Unit 3 was stopped by the 2nd Support Group artillery west of Charruba and Gruppe Olbrich reached Antelat, with a machine-gun unit having pressed on to the east of Sceleidima; Gruppe Kirchheim had a column at Driana and the other at Er Regima. Air reconnaissance on 5 April, showed that the British were still retreating; Rommel ordered the Axis columns to meet at Mechili. Gruppe Fabris and the Ariete Division were stalled between Ben Gania and Tengeder, south of Mechili and in the evening Rommel detached Machine-gun Battalion 8 (Lieutenant-Colonel Gustav Ponath) from Gruppe Streich and led it to Mechili, where the advanced units of Group Schwerin arrived early on 6 April. Ponath was sent on towards Derna with a small party, by which time Gruppe Kirchheim had one column near Maddalena and the other east of El Abiar. Reconnaissance Unit 3 had hardly moved and Gruppe Olbrich had run out of fuel again. Ponath reached the coast road and advanced on the airfield south of Derna early on 7 April.

=== 6–8 April ===
Cyrenaica location map: 1 Mersa Brega, 2 Agedabia, 3 Msus, 4 Tocra, 5 Mechili, 6 Bardia

Kirchheim sent the non-mechanised parts of the Pavia Division (General Pietro Zaglio) and the Brescia Division (General Bortolo Zambon) along the Via Balbia and the mechanised and motorised units through the Jebel Akhdar. On 6 April, the Ariete Division reached Mechili and at noon, Ponath re-assembled his group near Derna airfield and cut one of the British withdrawal routes. The 5th Royal Tank Regiment (Lieutenant-Colonel H. D. Drew), repulsed two determined attacks and then counter-attacked with the last four British tanks. The rest of the British disengaged before the tanks were knocked out and the road was left open for stragglers in Derna. Neame had ordered CYRCOM headquarters to move back to Tmimi, west of Tobruk, where the Chief of Staff, Brigadier John Harding arrived early on 7 April, to find no sign of Neame or O'Connor. Harding ordered CYRCOM to move into Tobruk and reported his fears to Wavell in Egypt. During the withdrawal, Neame, O'Connor and Brigadier Combe had left Maraua at 8:00 p.m. and taken a desert track at Giovanni Berta but then took a wrong turning north towards Derna, instead of east to Tmimi and ran into Gruppe Ponath near Martuba.

Rommel had intended to attack Mechili on 7 April but the Axis forces were scattered, short of fuel and tired. Gruppe Fabris moved forward during the morning but the Ariete Division and Gruppe Streich took all day to arrive, having been attacked by the RAF; A Squadron of the Long Range Desert Group had appeared from the south, to harass Axis movements. By nightfall on 7 April, the 9th Australian Division (less the 24th Australian Infantry Brigade) with the 2nd Support Group had blocked the Via Balbia at Acroma, about 15 mi (24 km) west of Tobruk, where the 18th and 24th Australian Infantry brigades were preparing the defences. (The 18th Australian Infantry Brigade had arrived from Egypt by sea after the dispatch of the 7th Australian Division to Greece had been cancelled.) A small force held El Adem, south of Tobruk to observe the approaches from the south and south-west and at Mechili, Gambier-Parry had the 2nd Armoured Division headquarters soft-skinned vehicles and a cruiser tank, most of the 3rd Indian Motor Brigade, M Battery 1st Royal Horse Artillery, part of the 2/3rd Australian Anti-tank Regiment and elements of other units.

The Germans tried twice to bluff Gambier-Parry into surrender but he had received orders from CYRCOM to break out and retreat to El Adem, Gambier-Parry decided to attack at dawn, to gain a measure of surprise. On 8 April, A Squadron of the 18th Cavalry broke through and then turned to attack Italian artillery, as some Indian troops of the 11th Prince Albert Victor's Own Cavalry (Frontier Force) got away. Most of the garrison was pinned down but during a second attempt at 8:00 a.m., small parties of the 2nd Royal Lancers escaped. The garrison had fired most of its small arms ammunition at the vision slits of the German tanks, which had hung back in fear of mines and when Italian infantry attacked, had little ammunition left. Gambier-Parry and 2,700–3,000 British, Indian and Australian troops surrendered to Major-General Pietro Zaglio, commander of the Pavia Division.

=== Tobruk ===
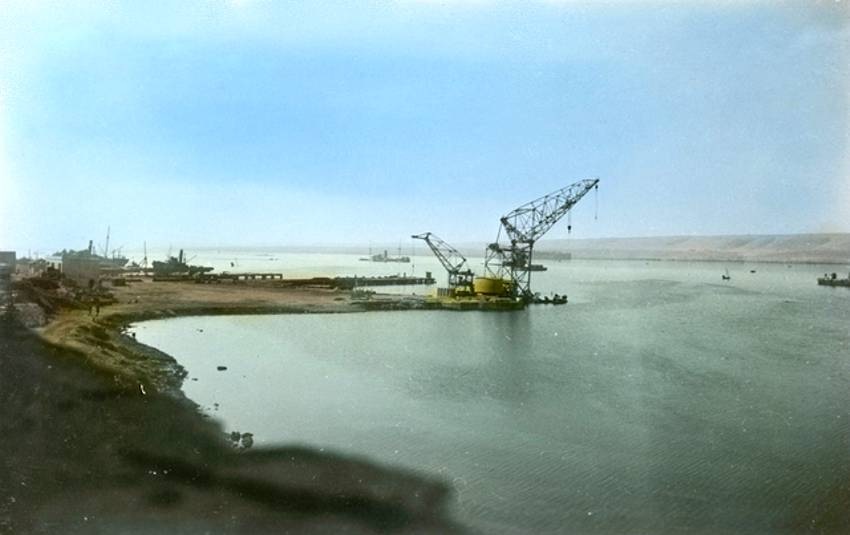
Tobruk harbour in 1941

By 8 April, the most advanced German units had arrived at Derna but some units which had cut across the chord of the Jebel, ran out of water and fuel at Tengeder. Prittwitz, the commander of the 15th Panzer Division was sent ahead with a column of reconnaissance, anti-tank, machine-gun and artillery units, to block the eastern exit from Tobruk, as the 5th Light Afrika Division moved from the south-west and the Brescia Division advanced from the west. Rommel hoped to pursue CYRCOM across Egypt and take Alexandria but overstretched supply lines, opposition from OKW and the British defence of Tobruk made this impossible.

On 10 April, Rommel made the Suez Canal the objective of the DAK and ordered that a breakout from Tobruk was to be prevented. Next day the port was invested but the rush ended with the 5th Light Afrika Division on the east side, Group Prittwitz to the south (Prittwitz having been killed) and the Brescia Division to the west. Reconnaissance Unit 3 went on to Bardia and a composite force was sent on to Sollum to try to reach Mersa Matruh. The force was prevented by the British Mobile Force (Brigadier William Gott) on the frontier, which conducted a delaying action around Sollum and Capuzzo. Tobruk was defended by a force of about 25,000 British and Australian troops, well stocked with supplies and linked to Egypt by the Navy. The garrison had armoured cars and captured Italian tanks, which could raid Axis supply convoys as they passed Tobruk for the frontier and made impossible an Axis invasion of Egypt.

== Aftermath ==
=== Analysis ===
In 1956, Ian Playfair, the British official historian, wrote that British assumptions about the time needed for an Axis counter-offensive were not unrealistic but were confounded by the boldness of Rommel and the fact that the 3rd Armoured Brigade was a brigade in name only, no tanks were available for the re-equipping of the brigade or the two in the 7th Armoured Division back in Egypt. When the DAK attacked there was no armoured force capable of counter-attacking or cutting Axis communications. By the time the British had retreated into the Jebel Akhdar, the infantry lacked mobility, the tanks of the 3rd Armoured Brigade had fallen to pieces and the only reserve was a motor brigade without tanks, artillery and anti-tank guns. For as long as the Axis forces had the fuel to manoeuvre, the British had no defence against outflanking attacks to the south. The retreat to Tobruk succeeded but the first Italo-German offensive had been an operational success and a "triumph for Rommel".

The Luftwaffe and Regia Aeronautica had little influence on operations, despite the disadvantages faced by the DAF during the retreat. The Fliegerführer Afrika was not under army authority and chose the objectives of the air forces. Many strafing attacks were made on parties of British troops and vehicles but these were not concentrated on bottlenecks, despite the few routes of retreat round the Cyrenaican bulge and south of the Jebel Akhdar. The DAF had been depleted to provide squadrons for Greece and had only two fighter and one bomber squadron until 8 April when another bomber squadron arrived. The fighter squadrons had to resort to wasteful standing patrols over important areas and were able occasionally to give cover to traffic jams but were unable to prevent air attacks on two petrol convoys, which were destroyed. The British lacked the aircraft to keep air superiority and the Axis air forces made no consistent attempt to seize it, leading to the influence of both sides being sporadic.

Supply constraints had made it impossible for the Axis to advance much beyond the frontier wire on the Libyan–Egyptian border by mid-April. As long as the port of Tobruk was held by the British, the Axis position on the border was unstable, as the Italo-Germans were distracted by the siege, while the British could rebuild their strength in Egypt. The British Mobile Force columns based at Halfaya, Sofafi, Buq Buq and Sidi Barrani began to harass the Germans in the area around Capuzzo and Sollum and after an ambush near Sidi Azeiz, the local German commander sent an alarmist report to Rommel, leading to an attack by Group Herff from 25 to 26 April, that pushed the British back to Buq Buq and Sofafi but the April attacks on Tobruk were costly failures.

Cooper wrote in 1978, that Tobruk had been invested on 11 April, after a twelve-day advance. German tanks had proved superior to their British counterparts but the Axis could not maintain a force further east than Sollum, without Tobruk. German forces probed the Tobruk defences from 11–12 April, attacked from 13 to 14 April and again from 16 to 17 April. On 2 May, Rommel accepted that the Axis force was not sufficient to capture Tobruk. Preparations would have to be made to repel a British counter-attack from Egypt, the chronic lack of fuel determining movement more than tactics. Comando Supremo (Italian armed forces high command) wanted a pause before advancing into Egypt, as did Hitler, who also considered the capture of Tobruk to be essential; Rommel demanded more aircraft to carry ammunition, fuel and water forward. General Friedrich Paulus, a deputy Chief of the General Staff, was sent to Africa to report on the situation. The British received through Ultra a decrypt of the Paulus report but the "considerable intelligence coup" was mishandled, encouraging the premature attack of Operation Brevity.

In 1993, Harold Raugh wrote that the diversion of so many British units to Greece was the main reason for the success of Sonnenblume, along with the transfer of units to Egypt to refit, the appointment by Wavell of incompetent commanders and his failure properly to study the terrain. The potential of the Germans to mount an offensive was underestimated and the capability, audacity and potential Rommel had to transform the situation was overlooked by Wavell, the War Office and Winston Churchill, despite copious intelligence reports from Ultra and MI 14 (British Military Intelligence). In 1949, Wavell wrote that he had taken an unwarranted risk in Cyrenaica, having formed expectations of the Axis based on the experience of fighting the Italian army; "I had certainly not budgeted for Rommel after my experience of the Italians. I should have been more prudent...."

=== Casualties ===
The British lost 3,000 men when much of the 3rd Indian Motor Brigade was forced to surrender at Mechili on 8 April. Lieutenant-generals Philip Neame and Richard O'Connor, Richard Gambier-Parry, the 2nd Armoured Division commander, Brigadier Reginald Rimington and Lieutenant-Colonel John Combe were captured. From 24 March – 14 May, the 3rd Armoured Brigade lost most of its tanks to mechanical breakdown, fuel shortage and demolitions to prevent them being captured. About twenty tanks had been returned earlier to Tobruk for repairs and another three unserviceable tanks were salvaged during the retreat; 103–107 German tanks were knocked out but many were recovered later and repaired.

=== Subsequent operations ===
==== Siege of Tobruk ====
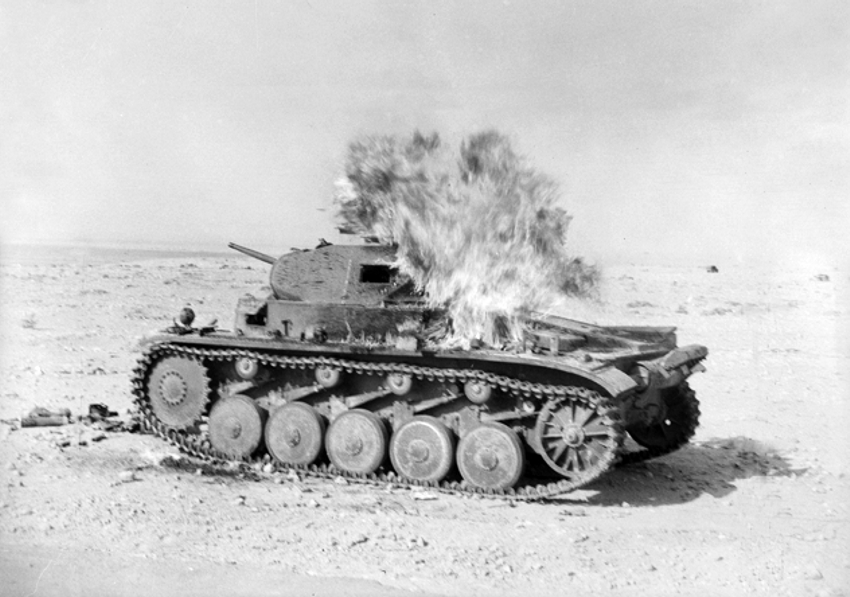
Panzer II on fire near Tobruk, 1941

From 11 to 12 April, Panzer Regiment 5 probed the defences of the 20th Australian Brigade near the El Adem road and was repulsed by artillery fire; German infantry who reached the anti-tank ditch were forced back by Australian infantry. The Germans were surprised, having assumed that the shipping at Tobruk was there to evacuate the garrison and planned an attack by the 5th Light Afrika Division for the night of 13/14 April. Groups of Axis vehicles were attacked by 45 Squadron and 55 Squadron RAF, which rearmed at the airfields inside the perimeter. The attack began with an attempt to get over the anti-tank ditch west of the El Adem road, in the 2/17th Australian Battalion sector and was repulsed. Another attempt was made later and by dawn a small bridgehead had been established; Panzer Regiment 5 drove through and turned northwards, ready to divide into one column for the harbour and one to move west and cut off the garrison but the advance was stopped. The Italians had been slow to provide blueprints for the port fortifications and after three weeks, Rommel suspended the attacks and resumed the siege. Italian infantry divisions took up positions about the fortress, while the bulk of the DAK maintained a mobile position south and east of the port, keeping the frontier in easy reach.

==== Operation Brevity ====
Operation Brevity area of operations

Operation Brevity (15–16 May), was a limited British offensive, planned as a rapid blow against the weak Axis front-line forces around Sollum, Fort Capuzzo and Bardia on the Egyptian–Libyan frontier. The British had received an Ultra intercept of the report compiled by Paulus, which dwelt on the exhaustion and the dire supply situation facing the Axis at Tobruk and the frontier, which encouraged a premature attempt to inflict losses on the Axis frontier garrisons and to capture jumping-off places for a later attack towards Tobruk. The garrison of Tobruk, 100 mi (160 km) to the west, had resisted Axis attacks and its Australian and British troops could still endanger the Axis supply line from Tripoli, which led Rommel to give priority to the siege, leaving the front line thinly held. On 15 May, Gott attacked with a mixed infantry and armoured force in three columns.

Halfaya Pass was taken against determined Italian opposition and in Libya, the British captured Fort Capuzzo but German counter-attacks regained the fort during the afternoon, inflicting a costly defeat on the defenders. The operation had begun well and had thrown the Axis commanders into confusion but most of its early gains were lost to counter-attacks and with German reinforcements arriving from Tobruk, the operation was called off. Gott became concerned that his forces risked being caught in the open by German tanks and conducted a staged withdrawal to the Halfaya Pass on 16 May. From 26 to 27 May, German troops recaptured the pass in Operation Skorpion. The British resumed preparations for Operation Battleaxe which began on 15 June.

== Orders of battle ==
=== Deutsches Afrikakorps ===
Data taken from Pitt (2001) unless indicated.

- Comandante Superiore: Generale d'Armata General Italo Gariboldi
- Generalmajor Erwin Rommel

5th Light Afrika Division

- Panzer Regiment 5 (Note: Data on Panzer Regiment 5 taken from Jentz (1998).)
  - 50 Panzer I
  - 45 Panzer II
  - 71 Panzer III
  - 20 Panzer IV
  - 3 kleine Panzerbefehlswagen
  - 4 Panzerbefehlswagen
- Reconnaissance Battalion 3

15th Panzer Division (arrived in stages up to May 1941)

- Panzer Regiment 8 (I & II Battalions) (Note: Data on Panzer Regiment 8 taken from Jentz (1998).)
  - 45 Panzer II
  - 71 Panzer III
  - 20 Panzer IV
  - 4 kleine Panzerbefehlswagen
  - 6 Panzerbefehlswagen
  - Motorized Rifle Regiment 104 (1 lorried battalion, 1 motor-cycle battalion, 1 battalion on foot)
  - Motorcycle Battalion 15
- Reconnaissance Battalion 33
- Motorized Artillery Regiment 33 (I, II & III Battalions)
- Engineer Battalion 33
- Battery, Anti-tank Battalion 33
- Battery, anti-aircraft (88 mm)
- 33rd divisional services

==== 10th Army (Italy) ====
- 17th Infantry Division "Pavia"
- 27th Infantry Division "Brescia"
- 132nd Armored Division "Ariete"

=== Cyrenaica Command and British Troops Egypt ===
Middle East Command, General officer commanding General Archibald Wavell

General Officer Commanding & Military Governor of Cyrenaica Philip Neame, VC

GHQ Middle East Forces (Note: Order of battle taken from Playfair (2004 [1956]) unless indicated.)

Libya Cyrenaica Command

- 1st King's Royal Rifle Corps
- 1re Bataillon d'Infanterie de Marin (1 BIM)

2nd Armoured Division

- 143rd Field Park Troop, RE attached from 7th Armoured Division
- 4th Field Squadron RE attached from 7th Armoured Division
- 1st King's Dragoon Guards
- 2nd Armoured Division Signals
- 2nd Support Group
  - 9th Battalion, Rifle Brigade (Tower Hamlets Rifles)
  - 1re Compagnie, 1re Bataillon d'Infanterie de Marin (1 BIM)
  - 'D/J' Battery, 3rd Royal Horse Artillery
  - 104th (Essex Yeomanry) Royal Horse Artillery
  - 1st Company, Free French Motor Battalion attached
- 3rd Armoured Brigade
  - 3rd The King's Own Hussars
  - 5th Royal Tank Regiment
  - 6th Royal Tank Regiment
  - 16th Australian Antitank Company attached
  - 1st Royal Horse Artillery attached

9th Australian Division

- 2/3rd Antitank Regiment, Royal Australian Artillery (9th Battery only, 10th & 11th Batteries detached to 3rd Indian Motor Brigade, 12th Battery in Palestine until 5 April 1941)
- 51st Field Regiment, RA attached
- 2/13th Field Company, Royal Australian Engineers
- 2/3rd Field Company, Royal Australian Engineers
- 2/7th Field Company, Royal Australian Engineers
- 1st Royal Northumberland Fusiliers attached.
- One company detached to 9th Rifle Brigade from 26 March 1941
- 2/1st Australian Pioneer Battalion
- 20 Australian Infantry Brigade
  - 2/13th Australian Battalion
  - 2/15th Australian Battalion
  - 2/17th Australian Battalion
  - 20th Australian Antitank Company
- 24th Australian Infantry Brigade
  - 2/28th Australian Battalion
  - 2/43rd Australian Battalion
  - 24th Australian Antitank Company
- 26 Australian Infantry Brigade
  - 2/23rd Australian Battalion
  - 2/24th Australian Battalion
  - 2/48th Australian Battalion
  - 26th Australian Antitank Company

3rd Indian Motor Brigade

- 18th King Edward VII's Own Cavalry
- 2nd Royal Lancers (Gardner's Horse)
- Prince Albert Victor's Own Cavalry (11th Frontier Force)
- 2/3rd Antitank Regiment, Royal Australian Artillery
- 10 & 11 Batteries attached from 9th Australian Division

Egypt

HQ British Troops Egypt

- 11th Hussars (Prince Albert's Own)
- 1st (Royal) Dragoons
- 107th (South Notts Hussars) Royal Horse Artillery
- 4th Royal Horse Artillery
- 11th Czechoslovak (Middle Eastern) Battalion

Spring 1941

- 4th Royal Tank Regiment
- 7th Royal Tank Regiment
- 7th Armoured Division
- 4th Armoured Brigade
- 2nd Royal Tank Regiment
- 7th Queen's Own Hussars
- 7th Armoured Brigade
- 1st Royal Tank Regiment
- 8th (King's Royal Irish) Hussars
- 7th Support Group
- 2nd Battalion, The Rifle Brigade
- 'C' Battery, 4th Royal Horse Artillery
- 3rd Royal Horse Artillery
- 'M/P' Battery only, 'D/J' Battery with 2 Support Group
  - Polish Independent Carpathian Rifle Brigade
- I Rifle Battalion
- II Rifle Battalion
- III Rifle Battalion
- 1st Anti-tank Company
- 2nd Anti-tank Company
- Carpathian Artillery Regiment
- Engineers Group (HQ, 2 Companies)
- The Legion of Polish Officers attached
- Carpathian HMG Battalion
- Medical Services (2 Companies, 2 Sections, Forward Hospital)
- Transport Column (3 Platoons)
- Carpathian Lancers Regiment
- Signals Group (HQ, 1 Company, 3 Platoons)

Alexandria Sub-Area

- 18th Australian Infantry Brigade
- Part of 7th Australian Division, en route for Greece
- 2/10th Australian Battalion
- 2/12th Australian Battalion
- 2/9th Australian Battalion
- 2/4th Field Company, Royal Australian Engineers
- 6th Australian Divisional Cavalry Regiment

Mersa Matruh Sub-Area

- 8th Field Regiment, RA

Suez Canal Sub-Area

- GHQ Troops
    - 6th Infantry Division
- 54th Field Company, RE
  - 16th Infantry Brigade
- 1st Argyll & Sutherland Highlanders (Princess Louise's)
- 2nd Leicestershire Regiment
- 2nd Queen's Royal Regiment (West Surrey)
  - 22nd (Guards) Infantry Brigade
- 1st Durham Light Infantry
- 2nd Scots Guards
- 3rd Coldstream Guards
  - Layforce (attached)
- 'A' Battalion Commando
- 'B' Battalion Commando
- 'C' Battalion Commando
- 'D' Battalion Commando

== See also ==
- Transliteration of Libyan place names
- List of World War II Battles
- North African campaign timeline

== Bibliography ==
- Bauer, E. (2000) [1979]. Young, Peter (ed.). The History of World War II (rev. Orbis: London ed.). New York: Galahad Books. ISBN 978-1-85605-552-9.
- Carver, M. (2002) [1986]. Dilemmas of the Desert War: The Libyan Campaign 1940–1942 (Spellmount ed.). Staplehurst: Batsford. ISBN 978-1-86227-153-1.
- Cooper, Matthew (1978). The German Army 1933–1945: Its Political and Military Failure. Briarcliff Manor, NY: Stein and Day. ISBN 978-0-8128-2468-1.
- Creveld, M. van (1977). Supplying War: Logistics from Wallenstein to Patton. Cambridge: Cambridge University Press. ISBN 978-0-521-29793-6.
- French, David (2001) [2000]. Raising Churchill's Army: The British Army and the War against Germany 1919–1945. Oxford: Oxford University Press. ISBN 978-0-19-924630-4.
- Hoffman, K. (2004). Erwin Rommel. London: Brassey's. ISBN 978-1-85753-374-3.
- Jentz, T. L. (1998). Tank combat In North Africa: The Opening Rounds, Operations Sonnenblume, Brevity, Skorpion and Battleaxe, February 1941 – June 1941. Atglen, PN: Schiffer. ISBN 978-0-7643-0226-8. LCCN 97-80326.
- Lewin, R. (1998) [1968]. Rommel As Military Commander. New York: B&N Books. ISBN 978-0-7607-0861-3 – via Archive Foundation.
- Long, Gavin (1961). "12, The Capture of Giarabub" (PDF). To Benghazi. Australia in the War of 1939–1945 Series 1 – Army. Vol. I (online scan ed.). Canberra: Australian War Memorial. pp. 287–304. OCLC 3134176.
- Luck, Hans von (1989). Panzer Commander: The Memoirs of Colonel Hans von Luck. New York: Dell (Random House). ISBN 978-0-440-20802-0.
- Maughan, Barton (1966). Tobruk and El Alamein. Australia in the War of 1939–1945. Series 1 – Army. Vol. III (online scan ed.). Canberra: Australian War Memorial. OCLC 954993.
- Pitt, B. (2001) [1980]. The Crucible of War: Wavell's Command. Vol. I (Cassell ed.). London: Jonathan Cape. ISBN 978-0-304-35950-9 – via Archive Foundation.
- Playfair, I. S. O.; et al. (1959) [1954]. Butler, J. R. M. (ed.). The Mediterranean and Middle East: The Early Successes Against Italy (to May 1941). History of the Second World War, United Kingdom Military Series. Vol. I (3rd ed.). HMSO. OCLC 1352065267.
- Playfair, I. S. O.; et al. (2004) [1956]. Butler, J. R. M. (ed.). The Mediterranean and Middle East: The Germans Come to the Help of their Ally (1941). History of the Second World War, United Kingdom Military Series. Vol. II (facs. repr. Naval & Military Press, Uckfield ed.). HMSO. ISBN 978-1-84574-066-5.
- Raugh, H. E. (1993). Wavell in the Middle East, 1939–1941: A Study in Generalship. London: Brassey's. ISBN 978-0-08-040983-2.
- Richardson, Tom (2010). The Siege of Giarabub December 1940 – March 1941 (PDF). SVSS Paper. Canberra: Australian War Memorial. Archived from the original (PDF) on 21 December 2018. no isbn
- Shales, J. (2015). A Detailed Fighting Account of the 2nd Armoured Division, 9th Australian Division, 3rd Indian Motor Brigade, 7th Support Group and 22nd Guards Brigade in combat with the Afrikakorps and Units of the "Ariete", "Brescia", "Bologna", "Pavia" and "Trento" Divisions: February – May 1941. Infantry, Artillery and Tank Combat in Libya and Egypt. Vol. I. Rainham: Armour. ISBN 978-0-9931732-0-2.
- The Rise and Fall of the German Air Force (No. 248). Public Record Office War Histories (facs. repr. ed.). Richmond, Surrey: Air Ministry. 2001 [1948]. ISBN 978-1-903365-30-4. Air 41/10.
- Wilmot, C. (1993) [1944]. Tobruk 1941 (Penguin ed.). Sydney: Halstead Press. ISBN 978-0-670-07120-3.
