= El Ezzeiat =

El Ezzeiat العزيّات
- Village
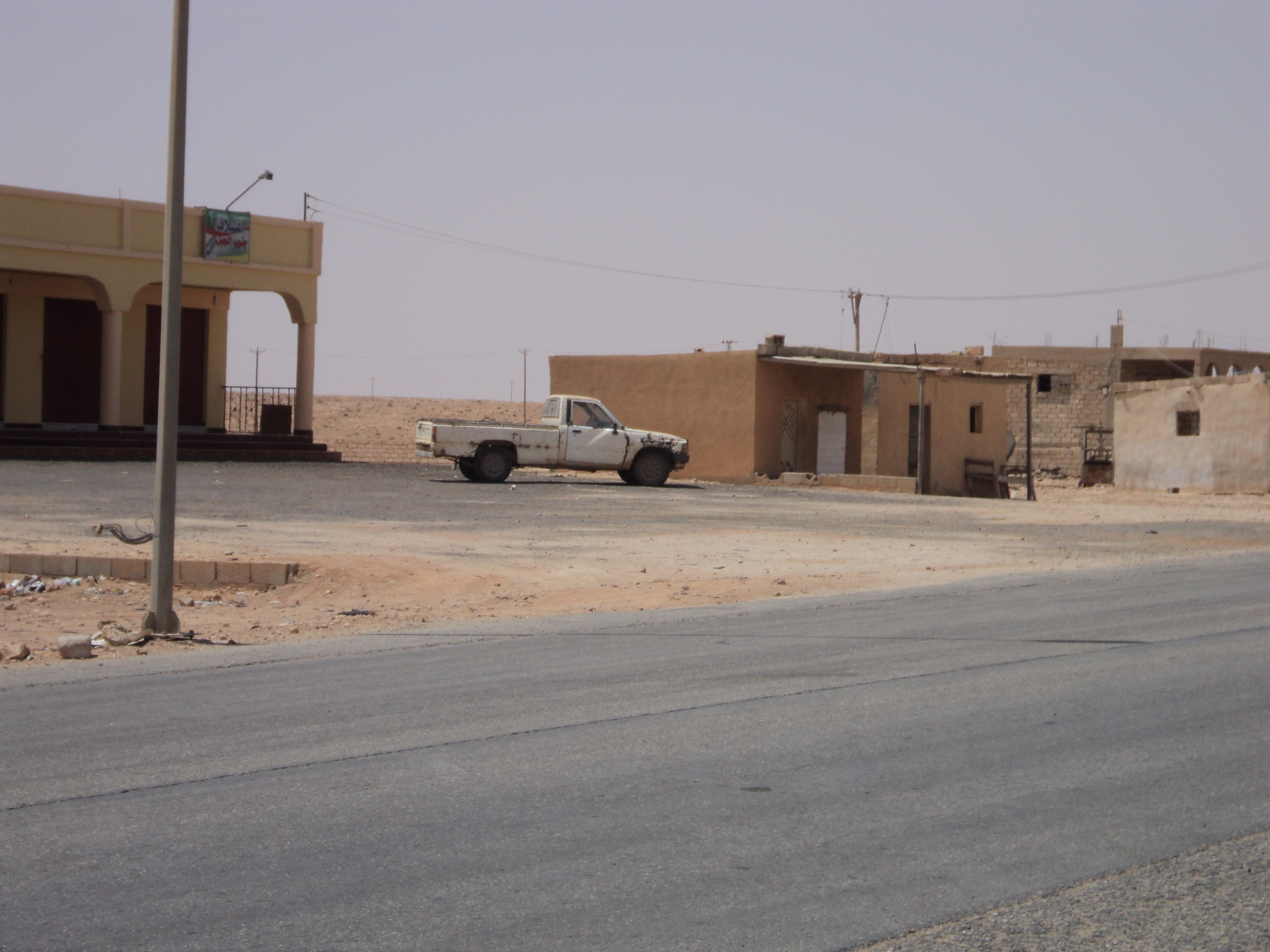

- Location in Libya
- Coordinates: 32°14′51″N 22°39′48″E
- Country: Libya
- District: Derna
- Time zone: UTC+2 (EET)

El Ezzeiat is a village in eastern Libya on the Charruba–Timimi Road. It is located 40 km (25 mi) east of Timimi and 40 km west of Mechili.
