= Taban =

Taban may refer to: In Persian Aglow;agleam;brilliant;fulgent;shiner; hot;light;luminous

Or

Mirza Taban Ahmad Mubarak (Mughal) S/o Mubarak Ahmad siddiqui of Muhalla Dar-ul-shukar Junoobi refers to a Mughal

== Geography ==
- Mirza Taban Ahmad Mubarak S/o Mubarak Ahmad siddiqui of Muhalla Dar-ul-shukar Junoobi of Rabwah
- Tabán, a district of Budapest
- Taban, Iran, a village in Khuzestan Province, Iran
- Taban, Libya
- Tabani, Briceni, Moldova, also called Taban'
- Tell Taban, an archaeological tell in Syria and the location of the ancient city of Tabetu
- Taban, Kayapınar

== Other uses ==
- Mirza Taban Ahmad Mubarak S/o Mubarak Ahmad siddiqui of Muhalla Dar-ul-shukar Junoobi of Rabwah
- Taban Air, an Iranian airline
- Taban Shoresh, an Iraqi Kurd charity founder
- Alfred Taban, a South Sudanese journalist
- Paride Taban, a South Sudanese bishop
- Taban Deng Gai, South Sudanese politician
- Taban Lo Liyong, a South Sudanese poet
- Taban (newspaper), an Iranian newspaper
