= Theodorias =

Theodorias may refer to:

- Theodorias (province), a Byzantine province in present-day Syria
- Olbia, Libya, or Theodorias, a Roman/Byzantine town
- Vaga (Tunisia), an ancient city, now Béja, known as Theodorias during the Byzantine rule
