= Tacnis =

Tacnis تاكنس Taknis
- Town
- Location in Libya
- Coordinates: 32°28′49″N 21°07′36″E
- Country: Libya
- Region: Cyrenaica
- District: Marj

Population (2006)
  - Total: 7,038
- Time zone: UTC+2 (EET)

Tacnis, also Taknis, or Tècnis, is a small town in Jebel Akhdar region in northeastern Cyrenaica, Libya. It is located 127 km (79 mi) east of Benghazi. It is on the inner road between Marj and Lamluda. There is a minor road connecting the town to the north with Libyan Coastal Highway. There is also an indirect road connecting it with Charruba to the south.

It is the birthplace of Hussein Maziq, a Libyan politician and former prime minister of Libya.

== See also ==
- List of cities in Libya
