= Qasr Libya =

Qasr Libya قصر ليبيا Gasr Elbia
- Town
- Location in Libya
- Coordinates: 32°38′N 21°24′E
- Country: Libya
- Region: Cyrenaica
- District: Jabal al Akhdar

Population (2006)
  - Total: 4,933
- Time zone: UTC+2

Qasr Libya or Qasr Lebia (Arabic: قصر ليبيا, lit. 'Lebia Castle', Lebia/Libya being a corruption of the ancient name Olbia) is a small town in northern Libya about 66 kilometres (41 mi) northwest of Bayda. In ancient times, it was a Roman / Byzantine town called Olbia and Theodorias, the ruins of which were excavated in the 1950s. The town contains a museum with fifty Byzantine mosaics. It is on the cross-roads between the eastwards Marj–Bayda main road, and the southwards Qasr Libya–Marawa road.
