= Pietro Zaglio =

Italian general during World War II

- Born: 20 April 1885; Verona, Kingdom of Italy
- Died: 16 June 1961; Belluno, Italy
- Military career
- Allegiance: Kingdom of Italy
- Branch: Royal Italian Army
- Rank: Lieutenant General
- Commands: "Monte Nero" Alpini Battalion "Belluno" Alpini Battalion; 67th Infantry Regiment "Palermo"; 7th Alpini Regiment; 17th Infantry Division Pavia; 26th Infantry Division Assietta
- Conflicts: Italo-Turkish War; World War I; Battles of the Isonzo; White War; Battle of Caporetto; Battle of Longarone; Battle of Monte Grappa; World War II; North African campaign; Operation Sonnenblume
- Awards: Bronze Medal of Military Valor; Order of Saints Maurice and Lazarus; Order of the Crown of Italy; Order of the Star of Romania

Pietro Zaglio (Verona, 20 April 1885 – Belluno, 16 June 1961) was an Italian general during World War II.

== Biography ==
He was born in Verona on 20 April 1885. After enlisting as a volunteer in the Royal Italian Army in 1909, being assigned to the 6th Alpini Regiment, he entered the Royal Military Academy of Infantry and Cavalry of Modena, graduating with the rank of second lieutenant of the Alpini corps. After being promoted to lieutenant, in 1909 he was assigned to the 65th Company of the "Feltre" Alpine Battalion, stationed in Agordo and part of the 7th Alpini Regiment. In 1911-1912 he took part in the Italo-Turkish War, fighting in Tripolitania and in Cyrenaica. After returning to Italy, he was promoted to captain and assigned to the 3rd Alpini Regiment, "Pinerolo" Alpini Battalion. After the Kingdom of Italy entered World War I on 24 May 1915, he distinguished himself on Mount Krn, earning a Bronze Medal of Military Valor, and after being transferred to the "Moncenisio" Alpine Battalion he took part in operations in Upper Carnia. Having then become commander of the "Monte Nero" Alpini Battalion of the 8th Alpini Regiment, he participated in the battles on Pal Piccolo, Pal Grande and Freikofel in the Carnic Alps, being wounded in action. After the battle of Caporetto the Carnic front had to be abandoned to prevent the encirclement of the troops stationed there, and after avoiding being encircled in the battle of Longarone and engaging the attackers in hand-to-hand combat in the churchyard of Bolzano Bellunese, Zaglio led the remains of his battalion on Monte Grappa. There he fought with his unit and was promoted to major; and when he learned that the commander of the "Monte Clapier" Alpini Battalion had been killed in action, he offered to replace him, fighting on the Col della Berretta until he was captured together with the only fourteen survivors of the battalion, almost all wounded. For this action he was mentioned in the Bulletin of the Supreme Command.

Having returned from captivity after the signing of the armistice of Villa Giusti, on 1 August 1919, Zaglio assumed command of the "Belluno" Alpini Battalion, which he held for some years. In 1932 he was promoted to colonel and assumed command of the 67th Infantry Regiment "Palermo" in Como, keeping it until 1934, when assumed command of the 7th Alpini Regiment in Belluno. He was promoted to brigadier general on 16 May 1938 and given command of the infantry of the 17th Infantry Division "Rubicone" in Forlì, which was later renamed 17th Infantry Division Pavia; in May 1939 he assumed command of the division, which at the time of Italy’s entry into World War II, on 10 June 1940, was in stationed in Libya, on the border with French Tunisia.

After the signing of the armistice of Villa Incisa, on 25 June the Division was transferred to the west of Tripoli, where it remained with coastal defence tasks until April of the following year, then participating in Operation Sonnenblume, the reconquest of Cyrenaica, after the arrival of the Afrika Korps; during this operation, in early April 1941, Zaglio received the surrender of General Michael Gambier-Parry and the British garrison of Mechili. Having fallen seriously ill, he then had to hand over command to General Antonio Franceschini and returned to Italy in May 1941. On 1 May 1942, he assumed command of the 26th Infantry Division "Assietta", stationed in Sicily, which he held until 1 February 1943. He was then promoted to lieutenant general and attached to the command of the Sixth Army for a month, and then to the Territorial Defence Command of Treviso. The armistice of Cassibile found him in his villa in Col di Salce (near Belluno), ill and tired and he remained here until the end of the war, taking no part in military and political events. After the end of the war, he was a city councillor and commissioner of the civil hospital in Belluno, as well as local President of the Nastro Azzurro Institute, the Veterans' Association, the War Mutilated Association and the Associazione Nazionale Alpini (ANA) Section of Belluno. He died on 16 June 1961, and was buried in the Prade cemetery in Belluno.
