= Charruba =

Charruba الخروبة Kharruba
- Village
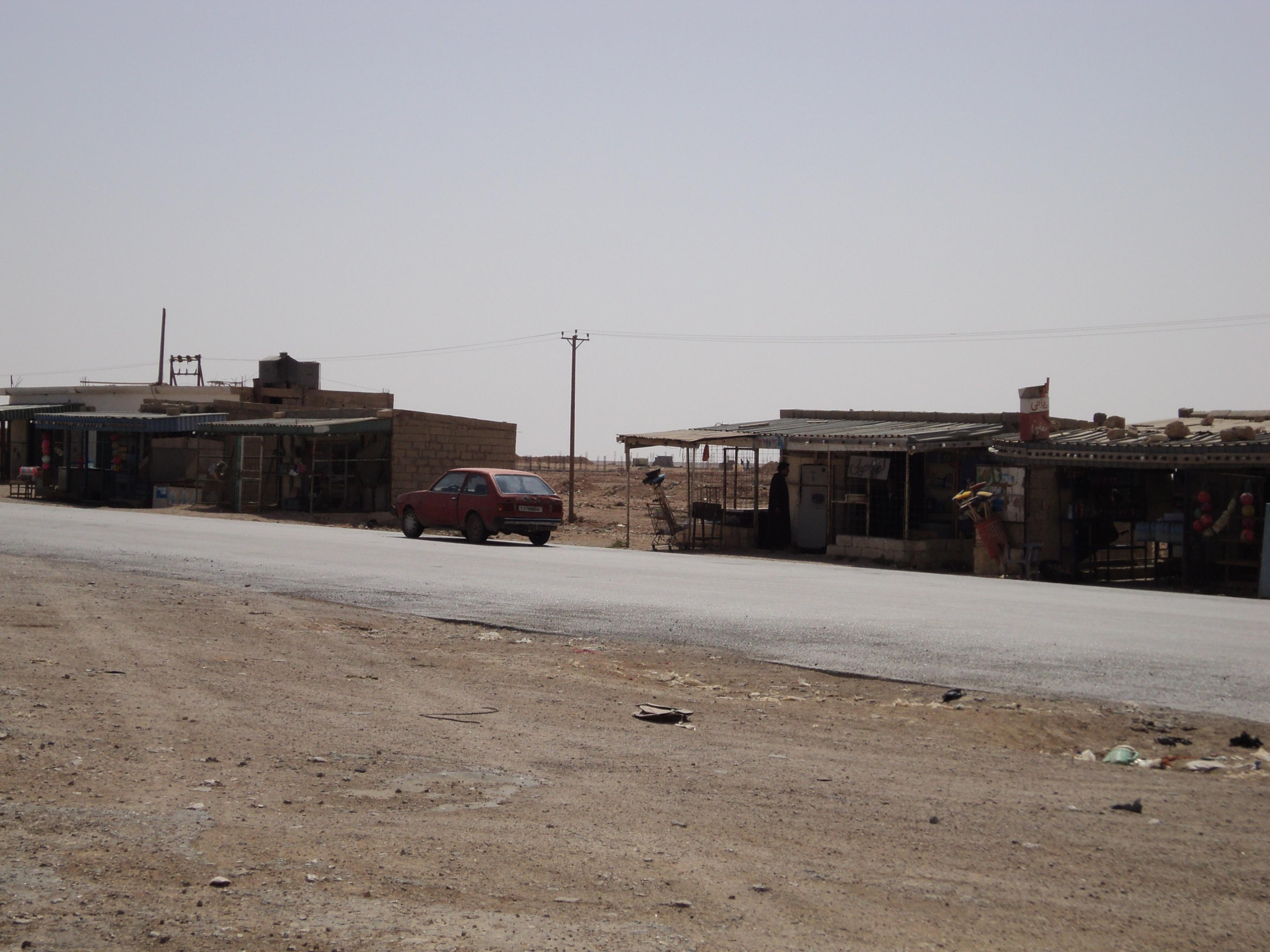

- Location in Libya
- Coordinates: 32°12′43″N 21°12′16″E
- Country: Libya
- Region: Cyrenaica
- District: Marj
- Elevation: 1,080 ft (330 m)
- Time zone: UTC+2 (EET)

Charruba or Kharruba (Arabic: الخروبة) is a village in northeastern Libya. It is located 66 kilometres (41 mi) south of Al Marj, and 186 kilometres (116 mi) west of Timimi. It is linked with Timimi by the Charruba-Timimi desert road, and with Tacnis (to the north) by an indirect road.
