= Msus =

Msus زاوية مسوس Zawiyat Msus
- Location in Libya
- Coordinates: 31°35′00″N 21°01′00″E
- Country: Libya
- Region: Cyrenaica
- District: Benghazi
- Time zone: UTC + 2

Msus or Zawiyat Msus (Arabic: زاوية مسوس), also Masous is a village in eastern Libya located 130 km (81 mi) southeast of Benghazi, and 80 km (50 mi) from Suluq on the same direction. There is another road linking her with Charruba (about 69 km (43 mi) to the north).

Msus was a site of several battles between Italian colonial forces and Libyan resistance fighters, such as the one that took place on March 3, 1914, after the Battle of Sceleildima.
