= Tauchira polychroa =

Scientific classification
- Kingdom: Animalia
- Phylum: Arthropoda
- Clade: Pancrustacea
- Class: Insecta
- Order: Orthoptera
- Suborder: Caelifera
- Family: Acrididae
- Subfamily: Catantopinae
- Tribe: Tauchirini
- Genus: Tauchira
- Species: T. polychroa

Binomial name
- Tauchira polychroa (Stål, 1875)

Species of short-horned grasshopper

Tauchira polychroa is a species of short-horned grasshopper in the family Acrididae. It is found in Southeast Asia.
