= Olbia, Libya =

Human settlement

Coordinates: 32°38′N 21°24′E

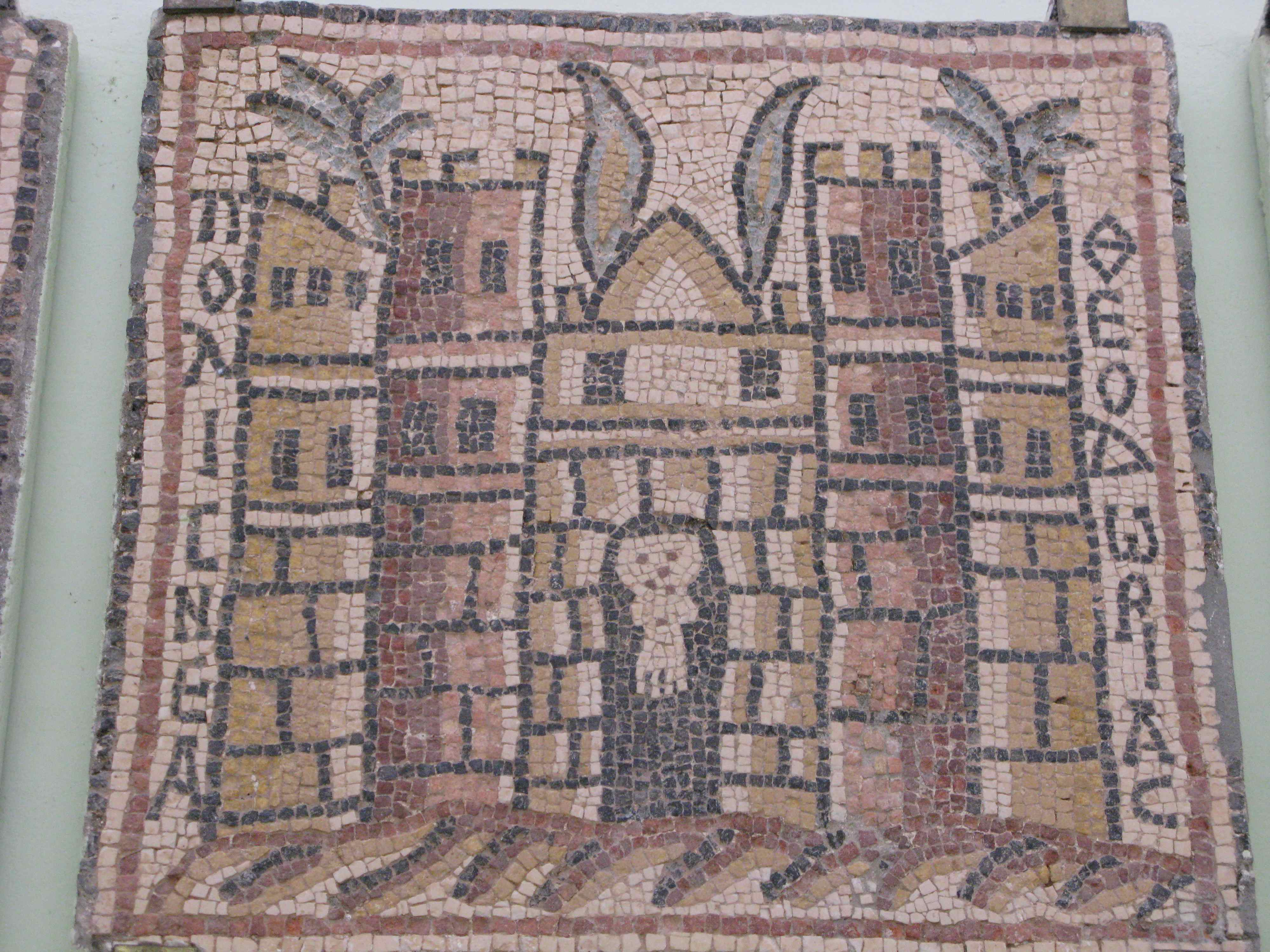
Mosaic commemorating the refounding of Olbia by Theodora (eastern church)

Olbia or Theodorias (Ancient Greek: Ὀλβία, Θεοδωριάς) was a Roman / Byzantine town between Marj and Bayda in the Cyrenaica region of modern Libya. Olbia is now mostly an archaeological site. The location's modern name is Qasr Libya, after the Islamic period castle (qasr) on the site and Libya or Lebia as a corruption of the ancient name Olbia.

== History ==
The ancient city of Olbia, after destruction by the Vandals and incursions by Laguatan (Lwatae) nomads, was refounded in 539 CE as polis nea ("new city") Theodorias by the Byzantine empress Theodora.

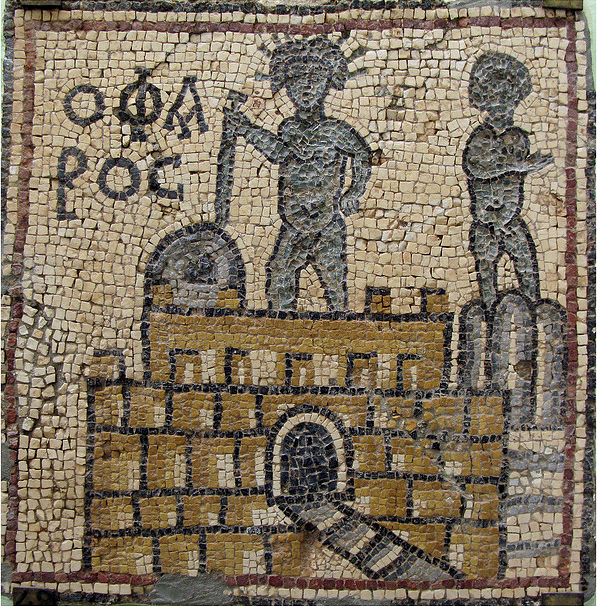
Mosaic of the ancient lighthouse of Alexandria in Olbia, Libya

All that remains of the town are two Byzantine churches. One is integrated into the Qasr, which now houses the Qasr Libya Museum. The other church was excavated by Richard Goodchild in the mid 1950s. Only the floor plan remains, but fifty beautiful mosaic panels depicting the known world and the refoundation and adornment of the city by Theodora are on display in the museum. In one of these, two mosaics reveal the names of Makarios and Theodoros, the bishops, the latter being qualified as a "new bishop," presumably Makarios's successor.

== Bishopric ==
There are five known ancient bishops of this ancient diocese. The first two are mentioned in the letter written by Synesius of Cyrene to Theophilus of Alexandria in 412, in which the author communicates to the Archbishop of Alexandria that after a long ministry and a long life died "the very best Father Athamas"; that the faithful of Olbia unanimously chose as his successor Antonios, an honest and just man.

Bishop Publius took part in the Council of Ephesus 431.

Since 1933 Olbia has been included among the bishopric holders of the Catholic Church; the title is no longer assigned from May 26, 1978.

=== Known bishops ===
==== Late antiquity ====
- Athamas (fl. 412)
- Antonios (fl. after 412 )
- Poplios (Publius) (fl. 431)
- Makarios (fl. 539/540)
- Theodoros (fl. 539/540)

==== Modern times (Catholic Church) ====
- Tihamér Tóth (1938–1939)
- James Colbert (1939–1955)
- Elie Vandewalle (1958–1960)
- Arcângelo Cerqua (1961–1978)
