= Libyan Coastal Highway =

Road in Libya

Location
- Country: Libya

Highway system
- Transport in Libya

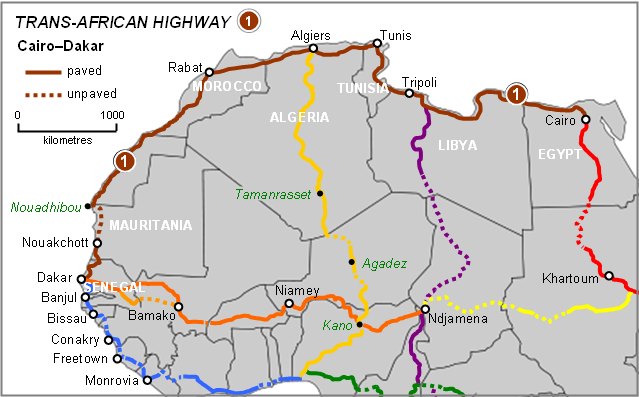
Map of the Cairo–Dakar Highway #1, with the Libyan Coastal Highway section, in the Trans-African Highway system.

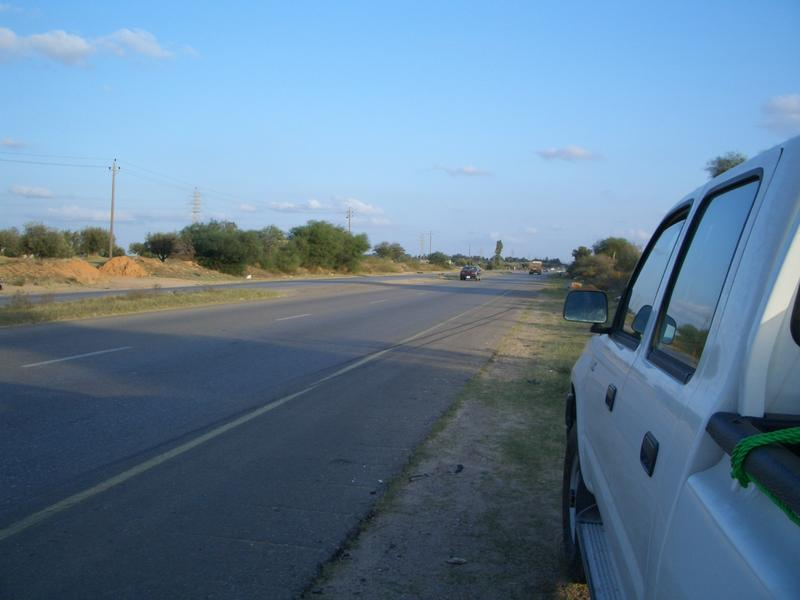
Tripoli—Misrata double-highway section of the highway (2004)

The Libyan Coastal Highway (Arabic: الطريق الساحلي الليبي), formerly the Litoranea Balbo, is a highway that is the only major road that runs along the entire east-west length of the Libyan Mediterranean coastline. It is a section in the Cairo–Dakar Highway #1 in the Trans-African Highway system of the African Union, Arab Maghreb Union and others.

Built under the rule of the Italian dictator Benito Mussolini in colonial Italian Libya in the 1930s, it was named Via Balbia' (or Litoranea Balbo) in honour of governor-general Italo Balbo, but renamed to "Libyan Coastal Highway" after independence and enlarged.

In the First Libyan Civil War of 2011, the highway was a strategic and symbolic element, as the main route through the contested coastal region between Sirte and Benghazi.

== History ==
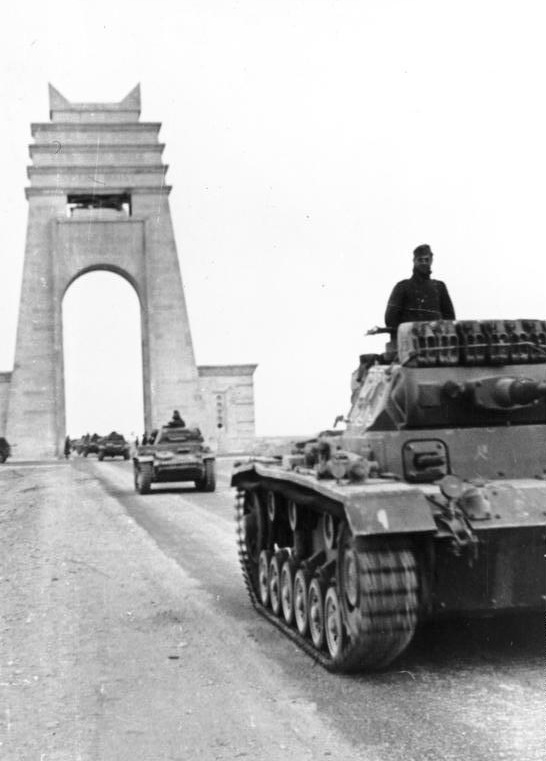
The Via Balbia at the Marble Arch with German Panzer III and II tanks (1941)

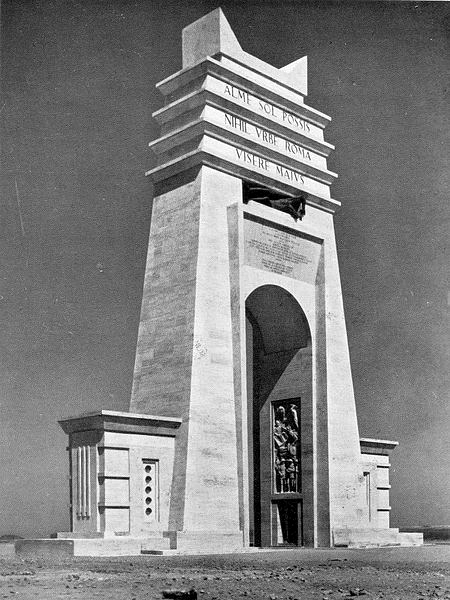
The Arch of the Philaeni, March 1937

=== Italian Libya ===
In March 1937, Italian dictator Benito Mussolini made a state visit to Italian Libya to open this new military and civilian highway, built by governor-general Italo Balbo. When Balbo died in 1940 in a plane crash, the Italian government named the 1822 kilometer road Via Balbia in his honour. It was used to improve the economy and viability of the Italian colony of Libya.

The Italians also constructed a minor 143 km (89 mi) long road parallel to the coastal road, starting from Marj through Marawa, to Lamluda.

The road was built from the Tunisian border to the Egyptian border and was extended in 1940 by the Via della Vittoria inside western Egypt. According to historian Baldinetti, the construction was done to give work to more than 10,000 Libyan Arabs.

Near the middle of the road, the border of Italian Tripolitania and Italian Cyrenaica was marked by a Marble Arch, named Arch of Fileni. It was created by the Italian architect Florestano Di Fausto. There was an inscription at the top of the arch which read: Alme Sol, possis nihil urbe Roma visere maius (Latin for "Oh kind Sun, may you never look upon a city greater than Rome"). The "Arch of Fileni" was demolished in 1970 by the new coup d'état revolutionary regime of Muammar Gaddafi.

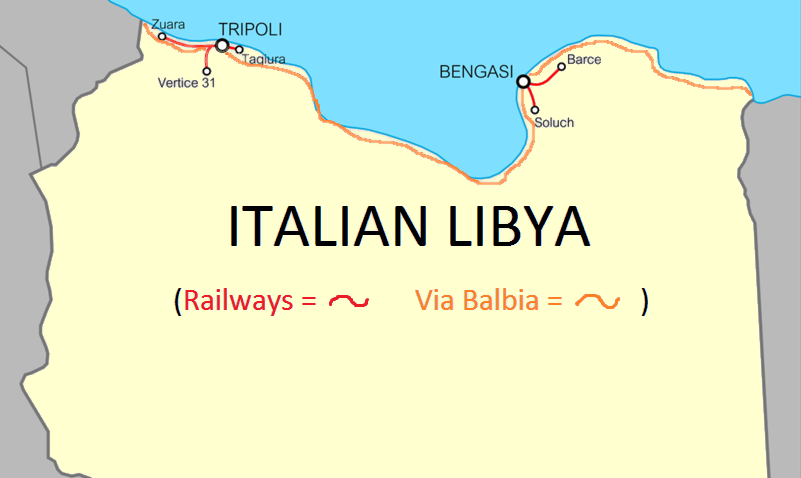
Course of the Litoranea Balbo and Libyan railways

A railway was planned for the central section of the Litoranea Balbo parallel to the road, to connect Tripoli and Benghazi but little had been built before the outbreak of the Second World War stopped construction.

=== World War II ===
The highway was fully paved. However, in World War II, during the Western Desert Campaign of the Allies North African Campaign, the road was heavily used in fighting the Axis forces, and remained damaged for decades. After the war the "Litoranea Balbo" was partially destroyed but in the 1960s it was improved and enlarged to four lanes in many sections with a new name, the Libyan Coastal Highway.

=== Independent Libya ===
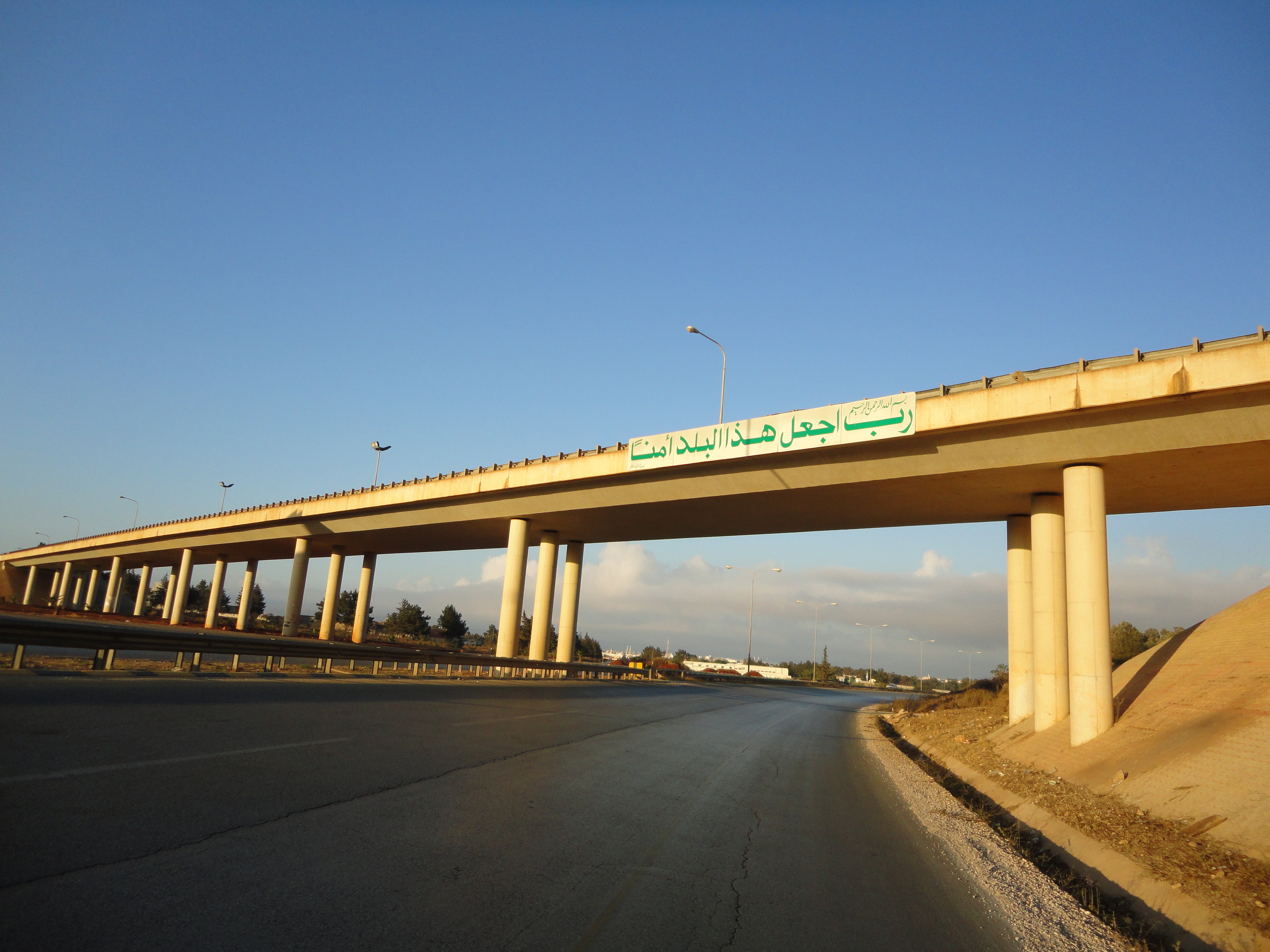
Highway with bridge overpass entrance to the east of Bayda (2010)

The road was renamed Libyan Coastal Highway after the country gained independence and was improved with enlargements. It was fully repaved in 1967. According to Hussein Maziq, prime minister of Libya (1965–1967) under King Idris, there had been plans to make this road a dual carriageway road. Two parts were built: the Sabratha—Tripoli—Misrata section; and the Ajdabiya—Benghazi—Taucheira section. The entire construction did not occur because of the coup d'état political change by Muammar Gaddafi on 1 September 1969. The "Arch of Fileni" was demolished in 1973 by the new revolutionary regime of dictator Muammar Gaddafi.

Before the 2011 Libyan civil war, the General People's Committee of Libya had issued an order for the Ras Ajdir—Sabratha section to be a dual carriageway road.

It's to be noted that some other roads in northern Cyrenaica are more Coastal, or closer to the coast, than the coastal highway itself, like Tolmeita-Tauchira road, and Derna-Susa road.

=== First Libyan Civil War ===
In the First Libyan Civil War of 2011 the highway was an active component for combat movement and skirmishes, and when a section's access and transit is under control - a strategic and symbolic element.

== Junctions ==
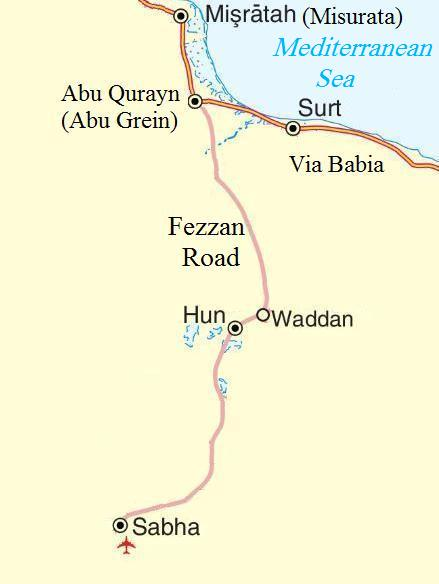
Map of the central section of the highway in the Misrata—Sirte region of Tripolitania, and its junction with the northern end of Fezzan Road.

The highway has become a junction for new southbound roads into the Fezzan region and Sahara, and new east-west shortcut highways in Cyrenaica and Tripolitania. They include:

- Ajdabiya–Kufra Road
- Charruba–Timimi Road
- Fezzan Road
- Tobruk–Ajdabiya Road
- Tripoli – Cape Town Highway
- Via della Vittoria

== See also ==
- Transport in Libya
- Via della Vittoria
- Italian Libya
- Marble Arch (Libya)
- Italo Balbo
