= Martuba =

Martuba مرتوبة
- Town
- Location in Libya
- Coordinates: 32°35′43″N 22°45′50″E
- Country: Libya
- District: Derna

Population (2006)
  - Total: 7,730
- Time zone: UTC+2 (EET)

Martuba is a town in eastern Libya in the Derna District. It is located at 32.575739n, 22.761505e, 27 km (17 mi) south of Derna and 557 miles from Tripoli and the city's population is 8,130.

The Martuba Air Base is located in Martuba. During the Second World War the airfield at Martuba, saw heavy fighting in 1942.

Martuba is connected with Lamluda by two roads. The main road which goes through Derna is part of the Libyan Coastal Highway while The inner road passes through the desert.
