= Tobruk–Ajdabiya Road =

Desert road in Libya

Location
- Country: Libya

Highway system
- Transport in Libya

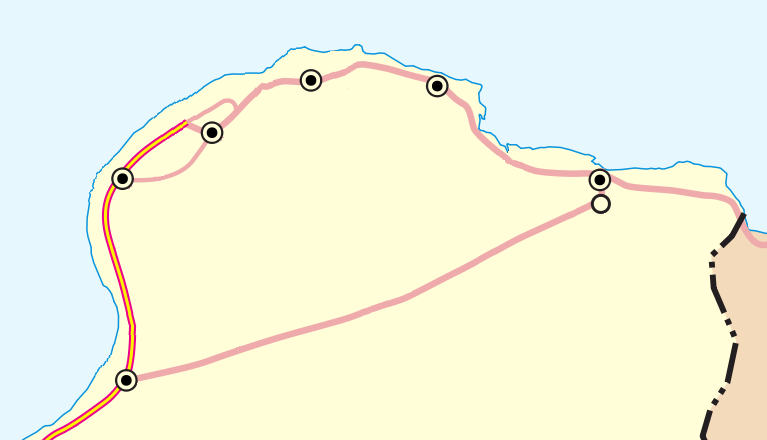

Tobruk–Ajdabiya Road is an asphalt road linking Tobruk and Ajdabiya, in the Cyrenaica region of northeastern Libya. It is used primarily by travelers between Tripoli and Tobruk, or to Egypt.

The road has shortened the distance between Tobruk and Ajdabiya to about 410 km (256 mi), from 610 km (388 mi) via the Libyan Coastal Highway (Via Balbia). However, the traffic on the road is negligible.

After the civil war that took place in 2011, the road witnessed several incidents made the traffic on it is dangerous, like:

1. May 2014: Capturing Egyptian drivers by an armed group, but later had been released.
2. August 2014: Capturing (and later murdering) five journalists working for Barca channel, after covering the inauguration of House of Representatives in Tobruk.
3. August 2015: Attacking the 200 check point (almost in the middle of the road), by an armed group, said to be a loyal to ISIL, killing at approximately four soldiers.
