= Lamluda =

Lamluda لملودة
- Village
- Location in Libya
- Coordinates: 32°46′44″N 22°08′35″E
- Country: Libya
- Region: Cyrenaica
- District: Derna
- Time zone: UTC+2 (EET)

Lamluda is a village in the Jebel Akhdar region of northeastern Libya. It is located 40 km (25 mi) east of Bayda.

Lamluda is on the cross-roads of several roads in northern Cyrenaica:

- It is connected with Marj by two roads, the northern one (through Bayda) is part of the Libyan Coastal Highway; the southern one (through Marawa) is 143 km (89 mi) long.
- It is connected with Martuba by two roads, the northern one (through Derna) is a part of the Libyan Coastal Highway; the southern one is the desert one.
