= Via della Vittoria =

Military road between Italian Libya and western Egypt

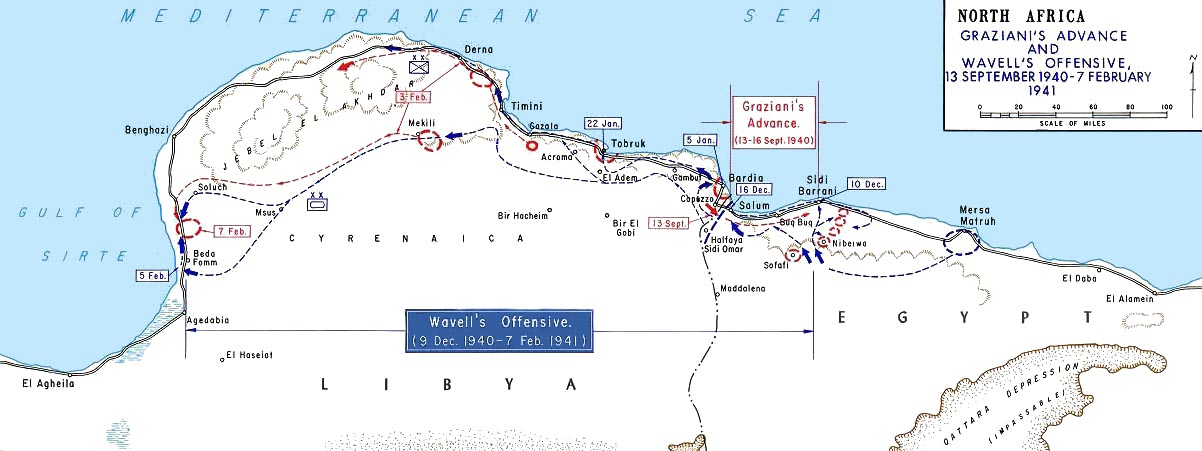
Map showing "Via della Vittoria" from Bardia to Sidi Barrani (click to enlarge)

The Via della Vittoria was a military road between Bardia in Italian Libya and Sidi Barrani in western Egypt.

== Characteristics ==
The "Via della Vittoria" (Victory Road), was built by Italian engineers during World War II, between September and December 1940. The road went from Sidi Barrani, Egypt, to the border of Italian Libya and connected to the Via Balbia. It was 11 metres (12 yd) wide and asphalted.

It was officially called Via della Vittoria nell'Africa Settentrionale Italiana in order to distinguish it from another "Via della Vittoria" built in 1939 in Ethiopia/Africa Orientale Italiana.

== History ==
The Italian Army invaded Egypt in summer 1940 and penetrated until Sidi Barrani. The need of communication in order to supply the Army forced the construction of this new road.

Proceeding in an orderly, colonial fashion, the Italian commander in Egypt, General Mario Berti, deployed the advanced units of his Army (1st and 2nd Libyan, 3 January Blackshirt, Cirene and Catanzaro Divisions, as well as Maletti’s motorised brigade group) in a ring of strong-points around Sidi Barrani, and began work on extending the Via Balbia into Egypt....

— Edmund Hall

In fall 1940 Italian Marshal Rodolfo Graziani ordered his Army in western Egypt to complete this new coastal road extending the Via Balbia 100 kilometres (60 mi) inside Egypt, even in order to create an infrastructure for a planned Italian invasion of the Nile Delta in January/February 1941.

In December 1940 the new road was used by the British forces during Operation Compass. In the next two years the road was damaged by the continuous changes in the front between Axis forces under Erwin Rommel and the Allies.

== See also ==
- North African campaign
