= Taban, Libya =

Taban زاوية النيان
- Village
- Location in Libya
- Coordinates: 32°12′N 21°32′E
- Country: Libya
- Region: Cyrenaica
- District: Jabal al Akhdar
- Time zone: UTC+2

Zawiat at-Taban, or Taban (Arabic: زاوية النيان); also An-Nayan or Wadi Sammalus, is a checkpoint in the District of Jabal al Akhdar in north-eastern Libya. It is located on the cross-roads between the Charruba–Mechili–Timimi desert road and the Marawa–Wadi Sammalus.

From February 1925 to August 1927, Wadi Sammalus was the site of several colonial battles between Italian forces and Senussi rebels.
