= Abu Sokheyr =

Abu Sokheyr ابوصخر
- Village
- Location within Iran
- Coordinates: 30°57′48″N 48°21′44″E
- Country: Iran
- Province: Khuzestan
- County: Shadegan
- Bakhsh: Central
- Rural District: Darkhoveyn

Population (2006)
  - Total: 702
- Time zone: UTC+3:30 (IRST)
  - Summer (DST): UTC+4:30 (IRDT)

Abu Sokheyr (Persian: ابوصخر, also Romanized as Abū Sokheyr; also known as Ābsokheyr, Abū os Khéīr, Oboskher, and Tābān) is a village in Darkhoveyn Rural District, in the Central District of Shadegan County, Khuzestan Province, Iran. At the 2006 census, its population was 702, in 106 families.
