= Tauchira =

Scientific classification
- Kingdom: Animalia
- Phylum: Arthropoda
- Class: Insecta
- Order: Orthoptera
- Suborder: Caelifera
- Family: Acrididae
- Tribe: Tauchirini
- Genus: Tauchira; Stål, 1878

Synonyms
- Bua Bolívar, 1918; Paratraulia Willemse, 1925; Servillenia Ramme, 1941; Sinacris Tinkham, 1940

Genus of grasshoppers

Tauchira is a genus of grasshoppers (Acrididae) in the subfamily Catantopinae and tribe Tauchirini. Species can be found in South-East Asia.

== Species ==
The Orthoptera Species File lists the following:

1. Tauchira abbreviata Serville, 1838
2. Tauchira buae Bolívar, 1898
3. Tauchira damingshana Zheng, 1984
4. Tauchira grandiceps Willemse, 1928
5. Tauchira hunanensis Fu & Zheng, 1999
6. Tauchira karnyi Willemse, 1925
7. Tauchira longipennis Liang, 1989
8. Tauchira obliqueannulata Brunner von Wattenwyl, 1898
9. Tauchira oreophilus Tinkham, 1940
10. Tauchira polychroa (Stål, 18750 - type species (as Oxya polychroa Stål)
11. Tauchira rufotibialis Willemse, 1925
12. Tauchira vietnamensis Storozhenko, 1992
