= Mechili =

Mechili المخيلي
- Village
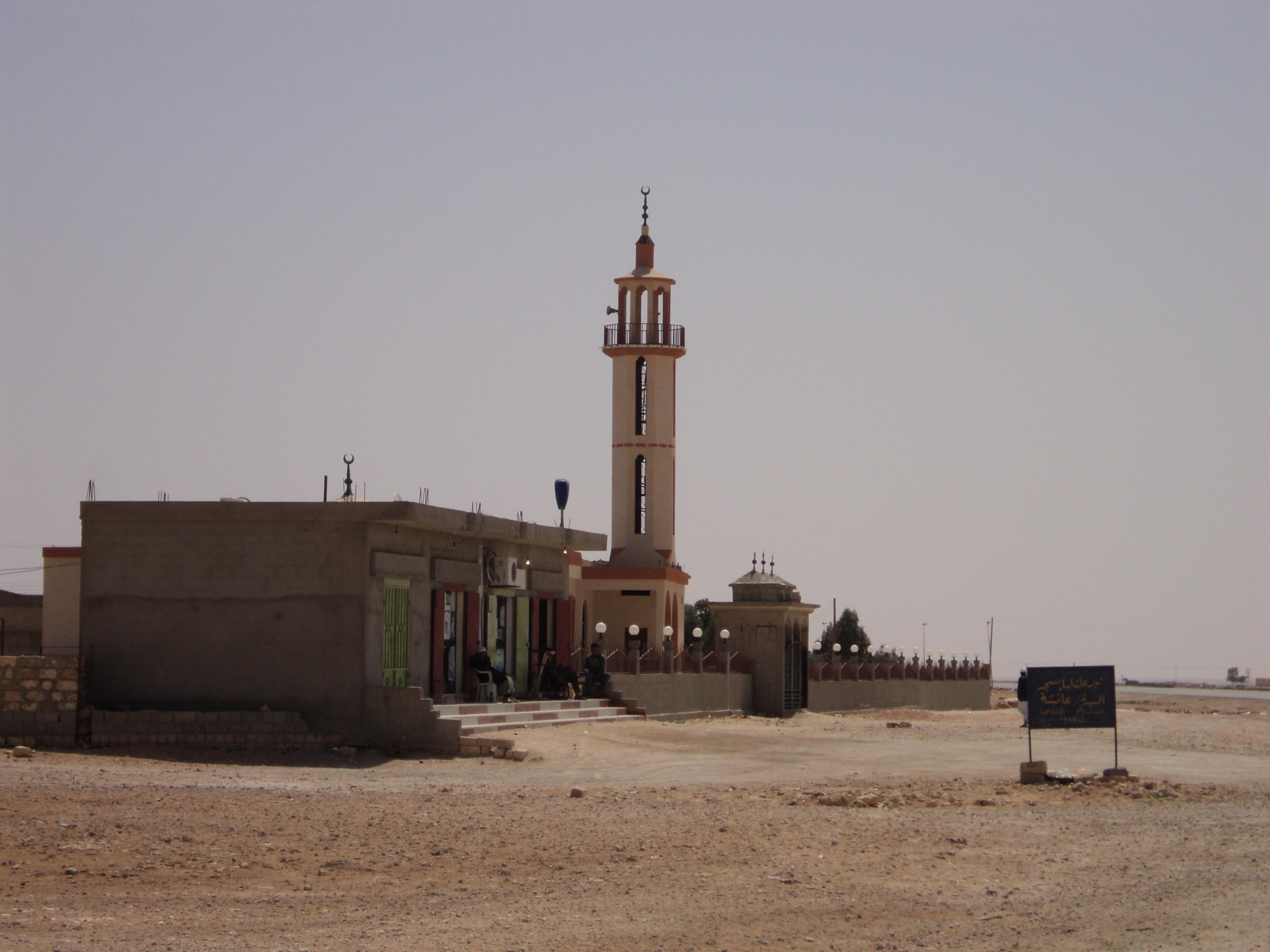

- Location in Libya
- Coordinates: 32°09′22″N 22°17′03″E
- Country: Libya
- District: Derna
- Elevation: 643 ft (196 m)
- Time zone: UTC+2 (EET)

Mechili (Arabic: المخيلي) is a small village in Cyrenaica, Libya and the site of a former Turkish fort. It is nearly 274 km (170 mi) east of Benghazi and 80 km (50 mi) west of Timimi.

== Geography ==
Because of its location in the desert, Mechili suffered in the past from isolation. However, its isolation ended after the paving of the Charruba–Timimi desert road between the years 1975–1985, and this road became the preferred route for travel between Tobruk and Benghazi. The village sits at an elevation of 196 meters (643 feet).

== World War II ==
- In January 1941, the British force named “Western Desert Force” under command of General Richard O’Connor (after taking Tobruk on 22 January) executed a daring outflanking movement and took Mechili from Italian forces on 27 January.
- On 7 April the same year, the Italian armoured division Ariete captured the British garrison at Mechili as a part of German Lieutenant General Erwin Rommel's first offensive through Cyrenaica with the goal of encircling the British forces, and this helped in capturing O’Connor near Derna the same month.
- On 18 December 1941, British forces re-took Mechili as a part of Operation Crusader.
- In early February 1942, Rommel's forces again took Mechili as a part of his second offensive through Cyrenaica.
- In November 1942, the British forces occupied Mechili for the last time.
