= Tocra =

Tocra توكرة
- Town
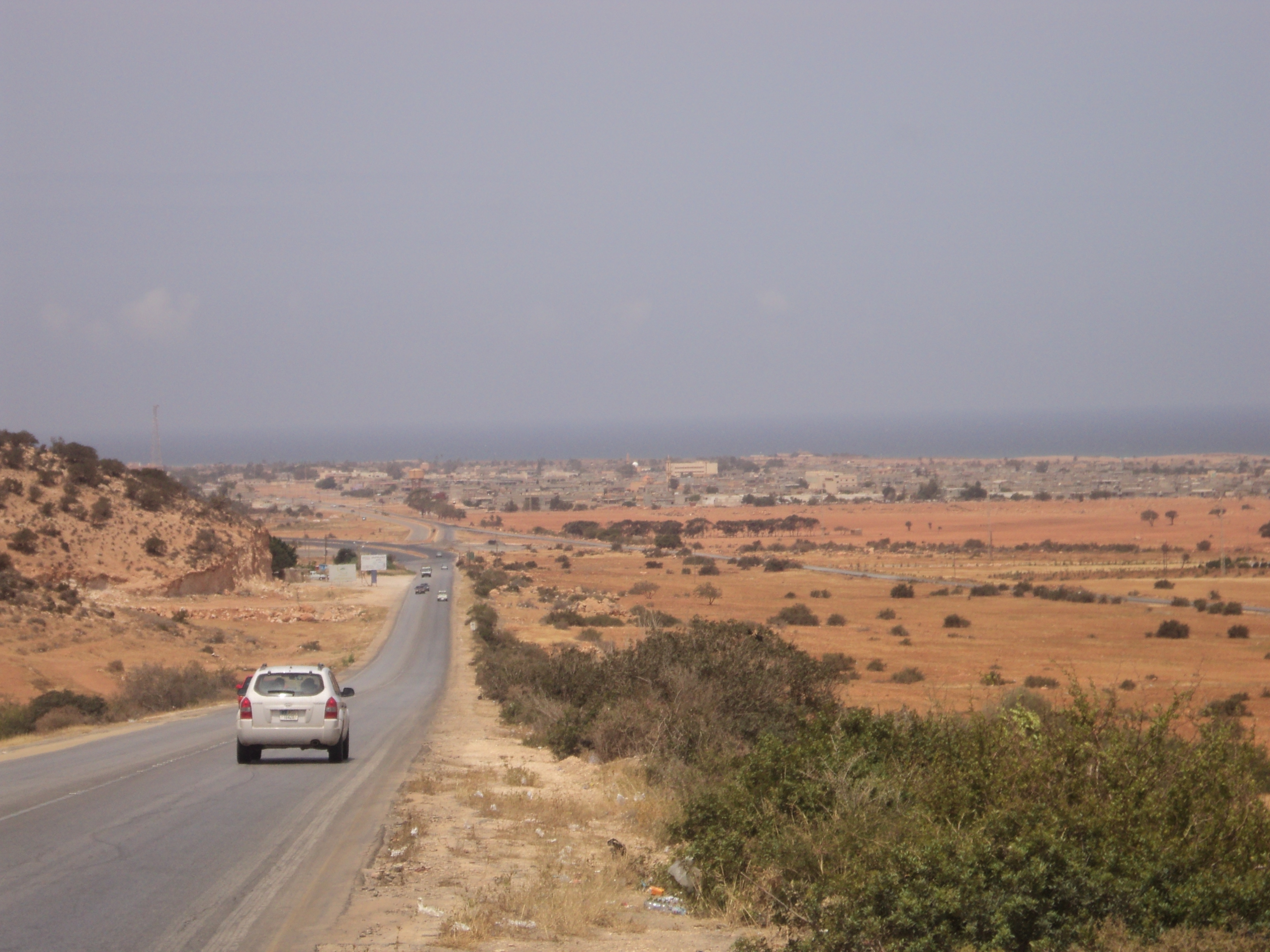

- Location in Libya
- Coordinates: 32°31′56″N 20°34′20″E
- Country: Libya
- Region: Cyrenaica
- District: Marj
- Elevation: 46 ft (14 m)

Population (2004)
  - Total: 23,164
- Time zone: UTC+2 (EET)
- License Plate Code: 52

Tocra, Taucheira or Tukrah, is a town on the coast of the Marj District in the Cyrenaica region of northeastern Libya, founded by Cyrene. It lay 200 stadia west of Ptolemais. Today it is a coastal town 25 kilometres (16 mi) west of Marj.

== History ==
Founded by the Greeks and considered by some to be part of the Pentapolis of Cyrenaica, at a later period it became a Roman colony (Tab. Peut.), and was fortified by Justinian I. (Procop. de Aed. vi. 3.) Taucheira was particularly noted for the worship of Cybele, in honour of whom an annual festival was celebrated. (Synes. Ep. 3.)

In the city fortifications from the Hellenistic, Roman and Byzantine periods have been found.

== Name ==
Taucheira, Teucheira, Tauchira or Teuchira (Greek: Ταύχειρα, Τεύχειρα,). Under the Ptolemies it obtained the name of Arsinoe (Arsinoë) (Greek: Ἀρσινόη), after Arsinoe II of Egypt, named by her brother and husband, Ptolemy Philadelphus. Later it became known as Tocra or Tukrah or Tokara, and then Al Quriyah or El Agouriya in Arabic.

It is the same town erroneously written Τάριχα by Diodorus (xviii. 20). It is still called Tochira.

== Agriculture ==
On a relatively small scale, residents of the town grow watermelon, cantaloupe, grapes, almonds, and tomatoes; but it is most famous for its figs.

== See also ==
- List of cities in Libya
