= Charruba–Timimi Road =

Road in Libya

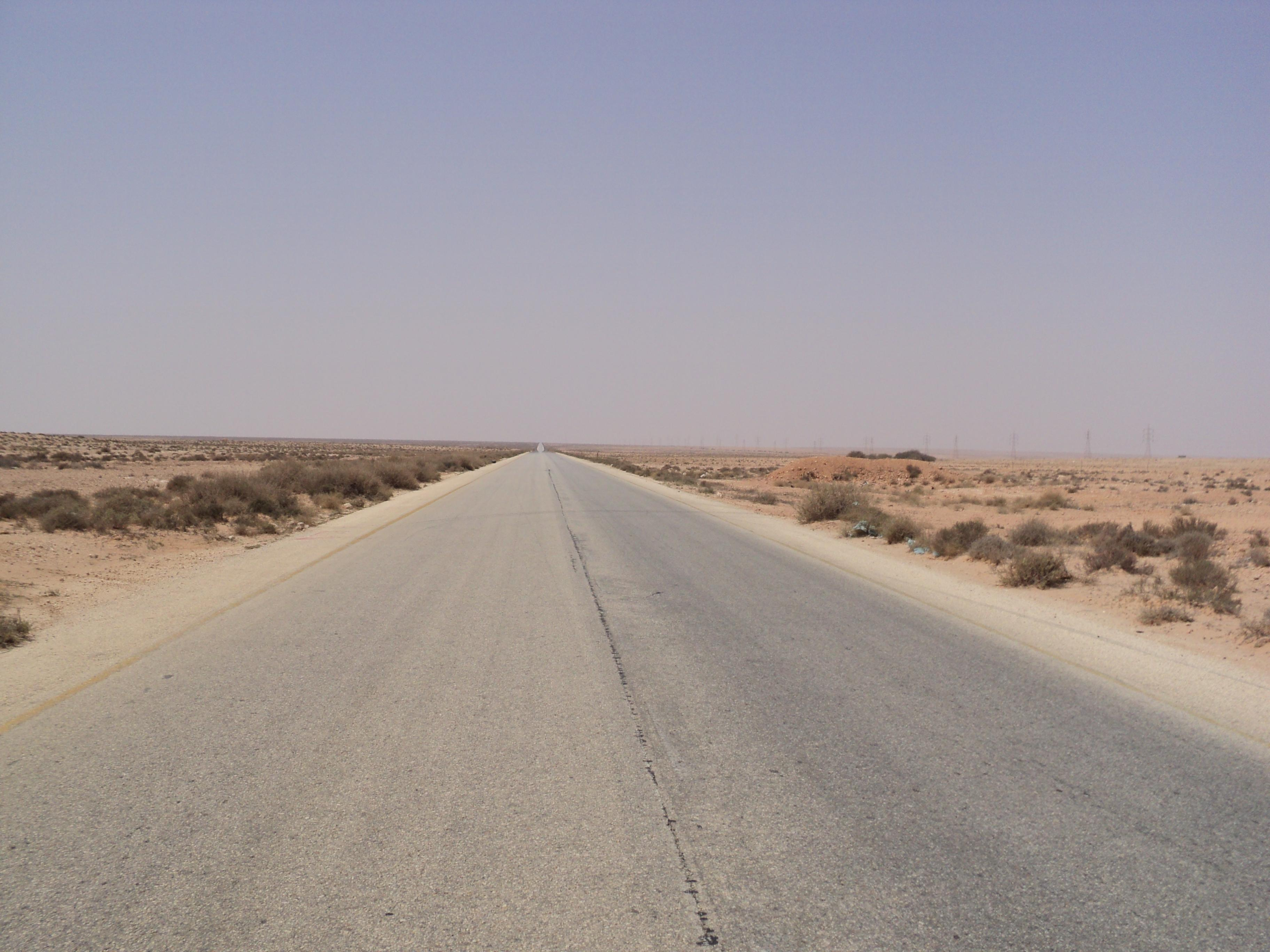

Route information
- Length: 186 km (116 mi)

Location
- Country: Libya

Highway system
- Transport in Libya

Charruba-Timimi road is an asphalt road in the Cyrenaica region of eastern Libya running from Charruba to Taban, Mechili, and Timimi. It is about 186 kilometres (116 mi) long and known in Libya as “Et Terigh El Foghiya” (literally "The Upper Road").

The Mechili-Timimi portion of the road was paved between the years 1975–1980 and the Charruba-At Taban-Mechili segment between the years 1980–1985.

This road has shortened the distance between Tobruk and Benghazi from some 470 kilometres (290 mi) along the Libyan Coastal Highway, to 450 kilometres (280 mi), and this route has become essential for traffic between the two cities. However, a shorter route between Tobruk and Benghazi along the Charruba-Abyar track measuring some 410 kilometres (250 mi) has not yet been paved.
