= Marawa, Libya =

Marawa مراوة
- Town
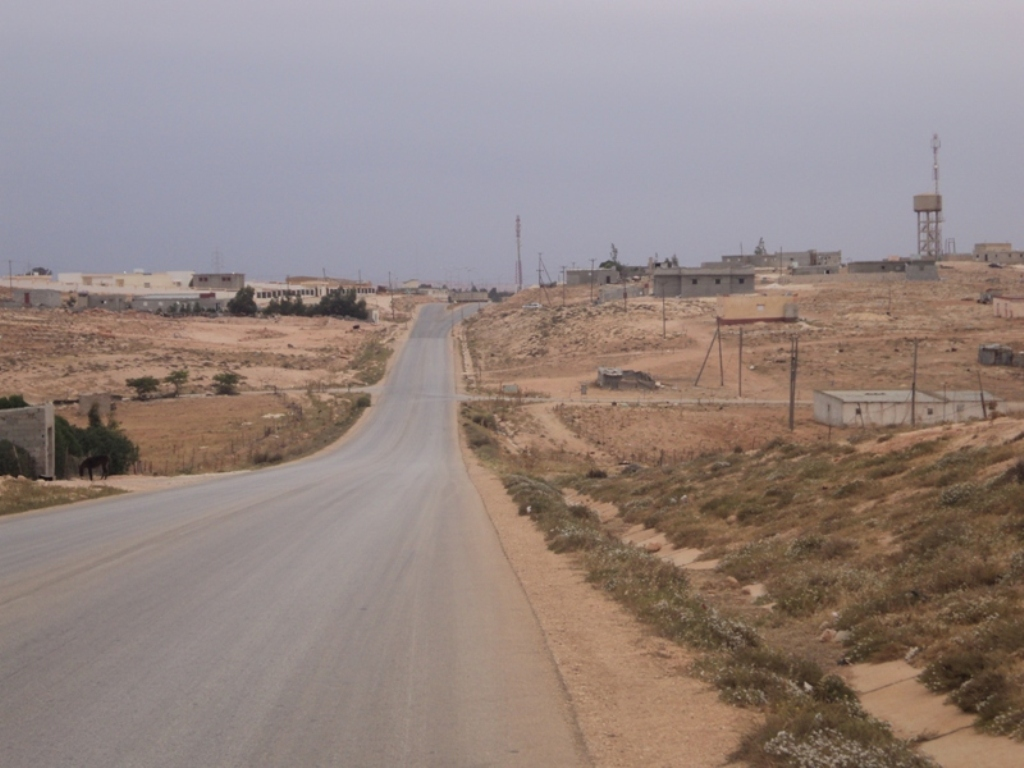
- Marawa western gateway

- Location in Libya
- Coordinates: 32°28′59″N 21°24′15″E
- Country: Libya
- Region: Cyrenaica
- District: Jabal al Akhdar

Population (2006)
  - Total: 4,510
- Time zone: UTC +2

Marawa (Arabic: مراوة) is a town in the District of Jabal al Akhdar in north-eastern Libya, about 65 km south of Bayda. It is located on the cross-roads between the Marj-Lamluda inner road, and the Qasr Libya-Taban road.
