= Marj =

Marj المرج El Merj
- City
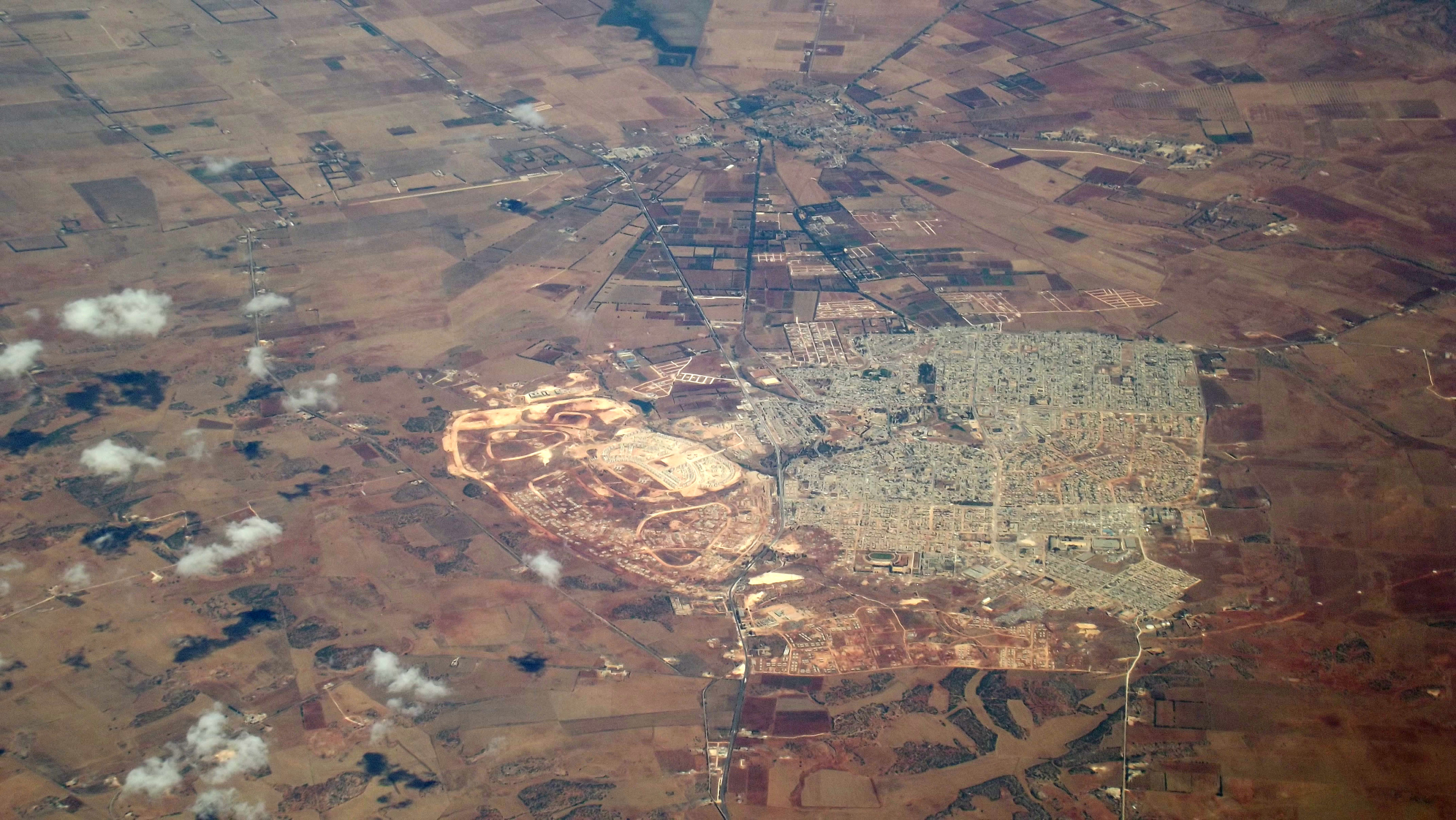
- Old (above) and new city (below)

- Location in Libya
- Coordinates: 32°29′12″N 20°50′02″E
- Libya: Libya
- Region: Cyrenaica
- District: Marj
- Elevation: 333 m (1,093 ft)

Population (2004)
  - Total: 85,315
- Time zone: UTC+2 (EET)
- License Plate Code: 18, 58

Marj (Arabic: المرج, al-Marj, "The Meadows"), El Merj in Benghazi Arabic, is a city in northeastern Libya and the administrative seat of the Marj District. It lies in an upland valley separated from the Mediterranean Sea by a range of hills, part of the Jebel Akhdar Mountains, and is generally believed to be the site of the ancient city of Barca.

As of 2004, it had an estimated population of 85,315. There are a couple of banks on the main street and the main post office is in the city centre, not far from the Abu Bakr Assiddiq mosque.

== History ==
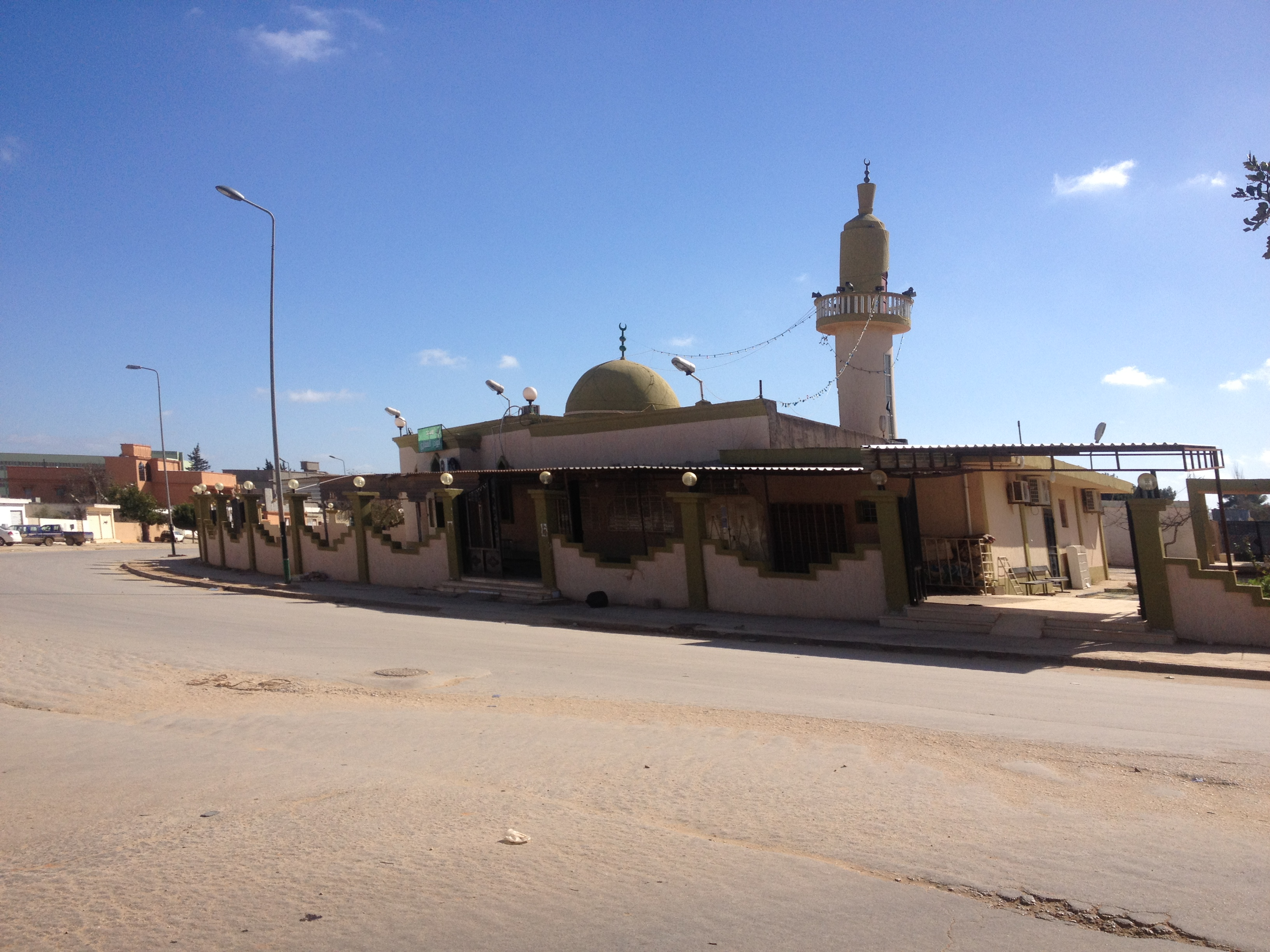
Abi Zar al Ghifari mosque in Marj.

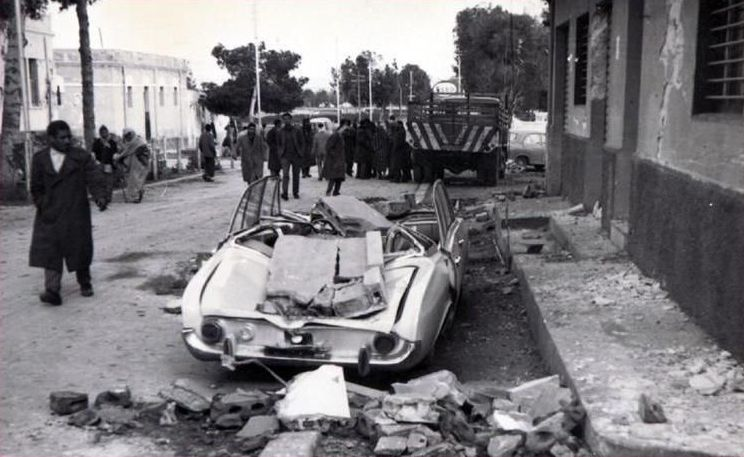
Damage during the 1963 earthquake.

According to most archeologists, Marj marks the site of the ancient city of Barca, which, however, according to Alexander Graham, was at Tolmeita (Ptolemais).

Marj grew around a Turkish fort built in 1842 and now restored. During the colonial dominance of Libya (1913–1941), the town was called Barce and was developed as an administrative and market centre and hill resort.

During the North African campaign of World War II, the 1st Field Regiment, Royal Australian Artillery won a battle for the region of Barce on 5 February 1941. The regiment commemorates this battle by naming the facilities at its base at Enoggera as Barce Lines.

From 1942 to 1943, the town was the capital of British-occupied Cyrenaica.

Most of it was destroyed by a 5.6 earthquake on 21 February 1963, which killed some 300 people and injured 500 more. Major rebuilding was undertaken about 5 km (3.1 mi) from the old site, and was completed about 1970.

== Transport ==
During the Italian colonization of Libya, Al Marj had been the eastern terminal of the Bengasi-Barce Railroad.

Nowadays, Al Marj is linked with Benghazi by two roads. One runs through Tocra (part of Libyan Coastal Highway). The other runs through Al Abyar.

Al Marj is linked also with Lamluda by two roads. One runs through Al Bayda (part of Libyan Coastal Highway). The other runs through Tacnis and Marawah. From Tacnis it leads to the Charruba–Timimi Road.

== See also ==
- List of cities in Libya
