= Timimi =

Timimi التميمي At Timimi
- Village
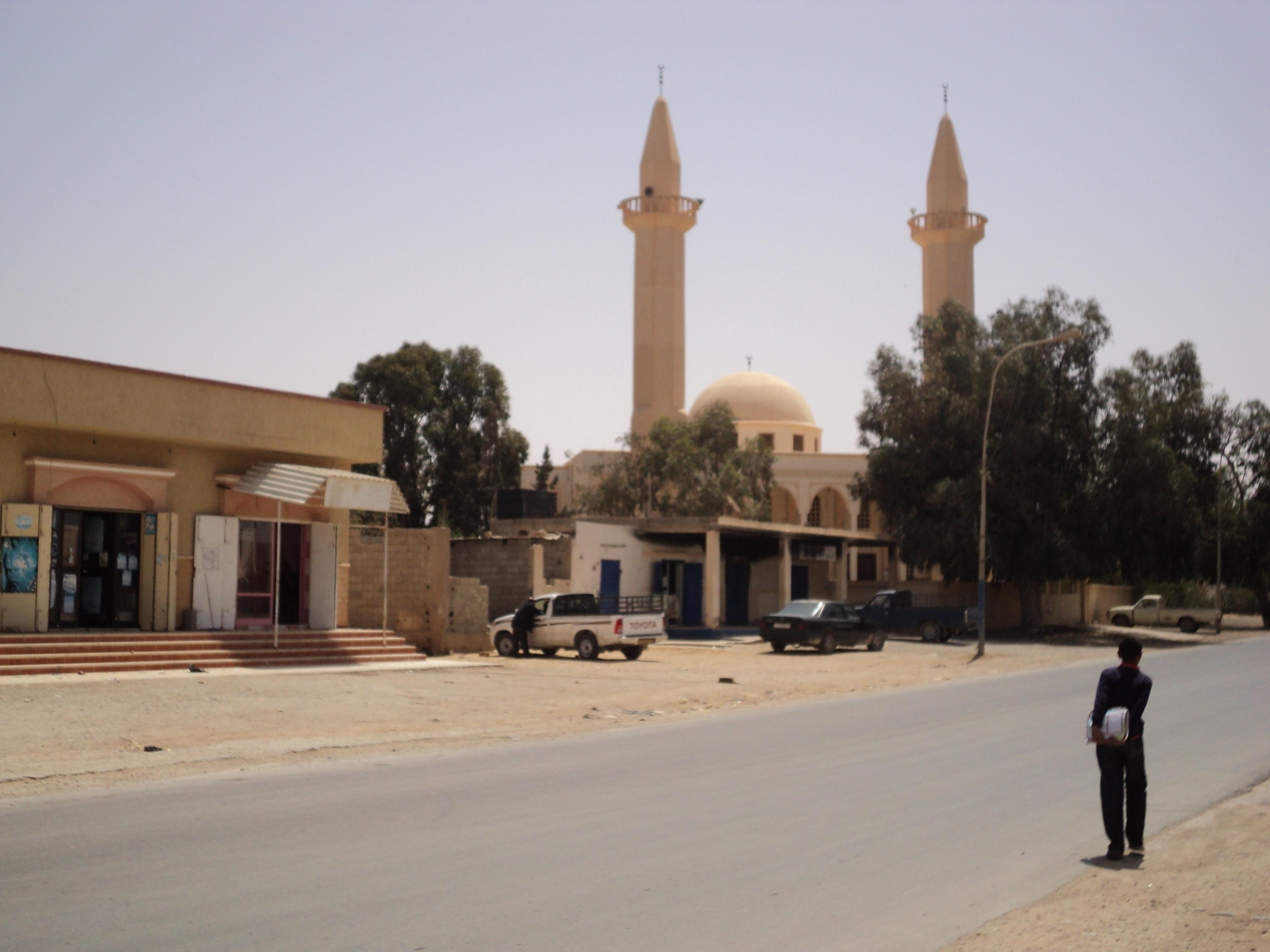

- Location in Libya
- Coordinates: 32°20′N 23°03′E
- Country: Libya
- District: Derna

Population (2006)
  - Total: 4,667
- Time zone: UTC+2 (EET)

Timimi, At Timimi (Arabic: التميمي) or Tmimi, is a small village in northeastern Libya about 75 km east of Derna and 100 km west of Tobruk. It is on the eastern shores of the Libyan coastline of the Mediterranean Sea.

== Geography ==
Due to its underground water being salty, Timimi was always a place of little importance, and its population in 2006 was 4,667. However, its situation improved after the Charruba–Timimi Road was paved between 1975 and 1985; it is now at the crossroads of the Charruba–Timimi Road and the Derna-Tobruk road.

== History ==
The Greek historian Herodotus said that Cyrene was founded in the mid-7th century BC by a group of Greek immigrants from Thera. These settlers under Battus first landed along the Gulf of Bomba (now the Gulf of Timimi) and stayed there for years before moving to Cyrene.

The settlement at Timimi was known in antiquity as Paliurus (Ancient Greek: Παλίουρος, Palíouros) after its nearby river, in turn named after the plants growing within its marshes. Near the village there was a temple to Heracles.

Its name was changed following its conquest by the early Muslim Caliphate in AD 642.

During World War II's African campaign, German general Erwin Rommel and his troops reached Timimi on 3 February 1942, stopping there until 26 May 1942, when Rommel began the Battle of Gazala, which is considered the greatest victory of Rommel's career.
