= Jalo Oasis =

Oasis in Cyrenaica, Libya

Coordinates: 29°1′N 21°32′E

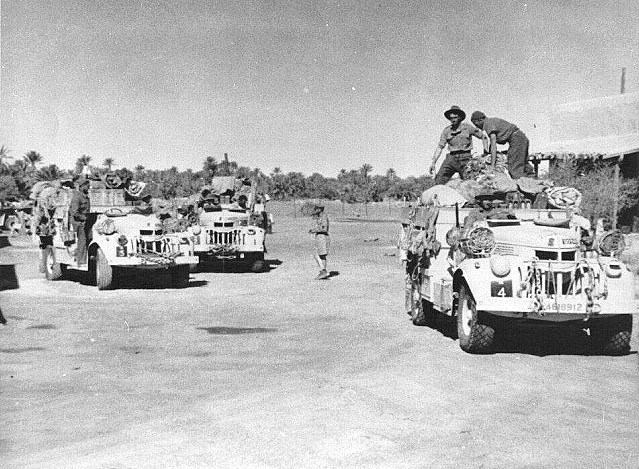
Heavily laden 30 cwt 1533x2 Chevrolets of R1 Patrol of the Long Range Desert Group setting out from Jalo Oasis. In the foreground is "R4" Rotowaro W.D.no. L4618912.

Jalo Oasis (or Jalu, Gialo) is an oasis in Cyrenaica, Libya, located west of the Great Sand Sea and about 250 km south-east of the Gulf of Sidra. Quite large, 19 kilometres (12 mi) long and up to 11 kilometres (7 mi) wide, it supports a number of settlements, the largest of which is the town of Jalu. Jalu was the administrative capital of the Jalu District from 1983 to 1988, at which time the area became part of the Ajdabiya District and as of 2007 is part of the Al Wahat District.

Because of its location and as a source of water, it had strategic importance during the North African campaign in World War II and changed hands several times between Allied and Axis forces.

The water of the Jalo Oasis is quite salty (3,880 parts per million). The water is an alkaline with a pH of 7.4 and is very hard with numerous dissolved salts in addition to sodium chloride.

== Communities ==
In addition to Jalu, the oasis supports the following communities:

- Al Hiri
- Labba
- Shurraf
- Masliwa
- Rashida
