= Transliteration of Libyan placenames =

Process of converting Libyan placenames from Arabic to English

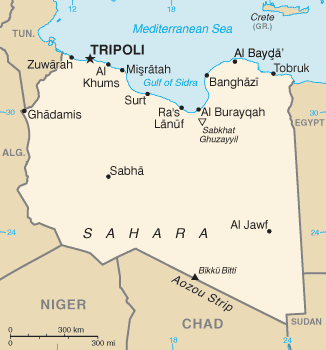
Map of Libya

Transliteration of Libyan placenames is the process of converting Libyan placenames written in the Arabic alphabet into the Latin alphabet. In most cases Libyan places have no common English name, so they need to be transliterated from Libyan Arabic or Standard Arabic. Many systems have been used, resulting in locations which have multiple transliterations in circulation.

== Background ==
During the Italian colonization of Libya, Italians attempted to phonetically transliterate the Libyan Arabic pronunciations of most place names according to Italian orthography, with the exception of places with pre-existing Roman, Greek, or Italian names, such as Al Qubbah ('Giovanni Berta'), Shahhat ('Cirene'), and Susa ('Apollonia').

During World War II, the British army used the Italian maps, so the Italian transliterations became common among the British government and English-speaking historians.

However, most Libyans were not acquainted with these previous experiments, and after the 1969 Libyan revolution, only Arabic script was allowed on signs or tablets.

There is no agreement on transliteration of Libyan placenames except for a few cities like Tripoli, Benghazi, and Tobruk.

== Examples ==
Here is a list of selected Libyan cities and towns, showing how the places have been transliterated from Standard Arabic and Libyan Arabic into Italian and English.

Note that any (h) preceded by a vowel is lightly pronounced or silent (like in Darnah).

Standard Arabic	Libyan Arabic	Italian	Page(s) in English Wikipedia
Ajdabia	Jdabia	Agedábia	Ajdabiya
Al Abraq	Labrag	Luigi di Savoia	Al Abraq
Al Abyar	Labiar	El Abiár	Aybar
Al ʿAziziyah	El Aziziyah	El Azizia	‘Aziziya
Al Baydaʾ	El Bayda	Beda Littoria	Bayda
Al Bardiya	El Bardiya or El Bûrdi	Bardia	Bardia
Al Jaghbub	El Jaghbub	Giarabub or El Giaghbub	Jaghbub
Al Khums	El Khums	Homs	Khoms
Al Makhili	El Mkhili	Mechili	Mechili
Al Marj	El Marj	Barce	Marj
Al Qubbah	El Gûbbah	Giovanni Berta	Al Qubah
Al Uqaylah	El Agheila	El Agheila	El Agheila
At Tamimi	Et Timimi	Tmimi	Timimi
Awjilah	Awjilah	Áugila	Awjila
Az Zawiyah	Ez Zawiah	Ez Zauia	Zawiya
Bani Walid	Bani Wlid	Beni Ulid	Bani Walid
Banghazi; Bani Ghazi	Banghazi	Bengasi	Benghazi
Darnah	Darnah	Derna	Derna
Daryanah	Deriana	Driána	Deriana
Ghadamis	Ghadamis	Gadames	Ghadames
Ghat	Ghat	Gat	Ghat
Gharyan	Ghiryan	Garian	Gharyan
Jalu	Jalu	Giálo	Jalu & Jalo oasis
Marsa Al Burayqah	Marsa El Breiga or El Breiga	Mersa Brega	Brega
Maradah	Maradah	Maráda	Marada
Marawah	Marawah	Maraua	Marawa
Misratah	Misratah	Misurata	Misrata
Qaminis	Ghemines	Ghemínes	Qaminis
Sabha	Sabha	Sebca	Sabha
Shahhat	Shahhat	Cirene	Shahhat & Cyrene
Suluq	Solug	Soluch	Suluq
Susah	Susah	Apollonia	Susa, & Apollonia
Tarabulus	Trablis	Tripoli	Tripoli
Yifrin	Yifrin	Jefren	Yafran
Zallah	Zallah	Zella	Zella
Zuwarah	Zwarah	Zuara	Zuwara

== See also ==
- Libyan Arabic
- Romanization of Arabic
- List of cities in Libya

== Bibliography ==
- El Hadi Mustapha Bulegma, & Saad Khalil Kezeiri (ed.), " Al Jamahiriya: Dirasa fil Jughrafia", Ad Dar al Jamahiriya lil nashr wa tawzee wa e'lan, Surt, Libya, 1995.

And Libya's maps at:

- Rodolfo Graziani, “Libia Redenta”, Torella Editore; Napoli, 1948, pp. 336–337,& 352–353.
- National Geographic Magazine, “Map of Africa”, a presented map in the February 1980 issue.
