= Jalu Municipality =

Former municipality of Libya

Coordinates: 29°01′N 21°30′E

Jalu Municipality (Arabic: جالو) was one of the municipalities (baladiyah) of Libya from 1983 to 1987. Its capital was Jalu.

Located in the country's northeast, the area was part of Ajdabiya District from 2001 to 2007. As of 2007, it was subsumed within the enlarged Al Wahat District.

== Towns and villages ==
The settlements in Jalu Municipality were Al Hiri, Labba, Mawahi, Shurraf, Jalu, Jikharra, Masliwa, and Rashida.
