= Ajdabiya District =

Former district of Libya

Coordinates: 30°45′N 20°13′E

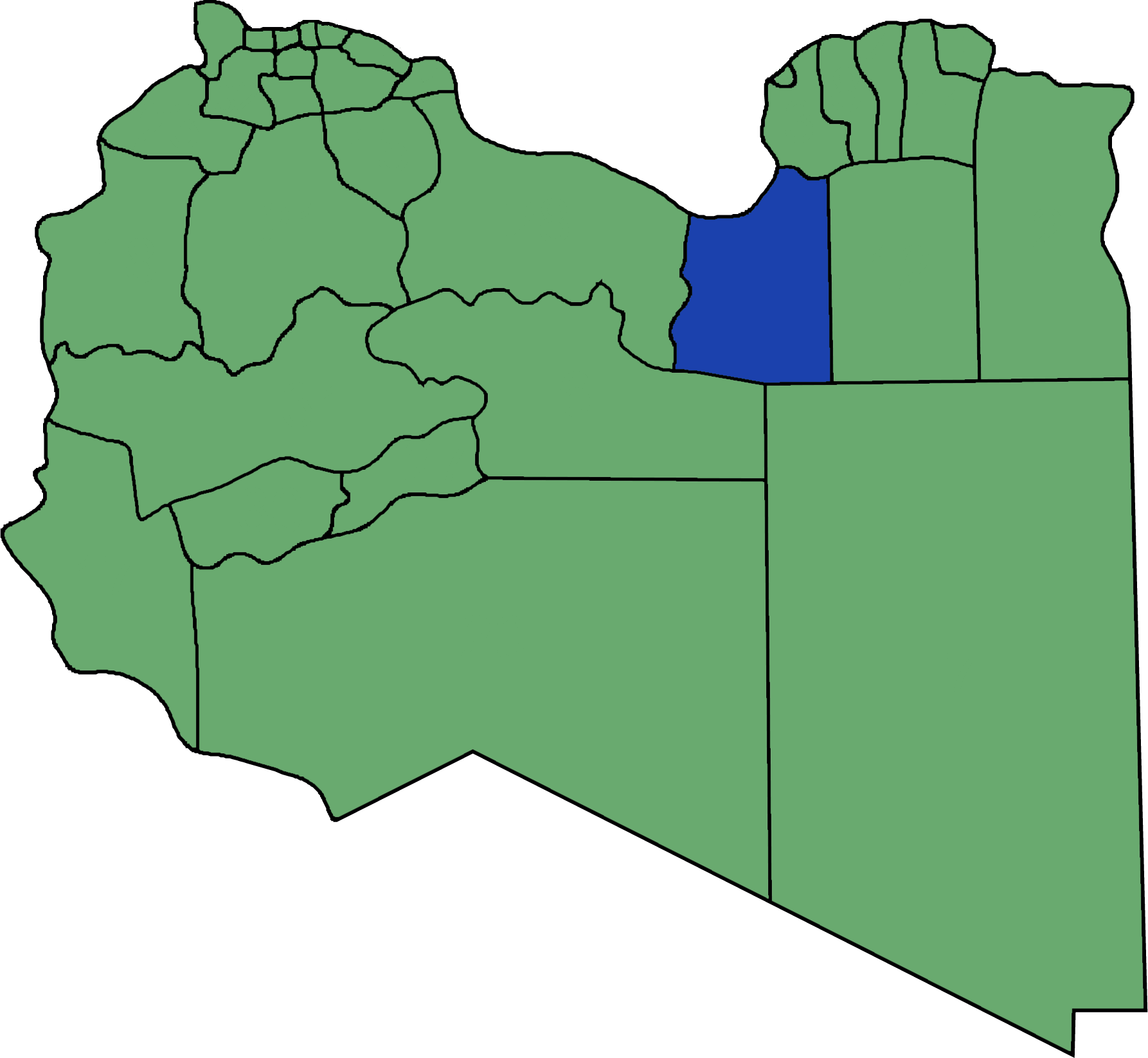
Map showing the 32 districts of Libya 2001–2007 with Ajdabiy District in blue.

Ajdabiya (Arabic: إجدابيا) is a former district of Libya. It lay in the northeastern part of the country. Its capital was Ajdabiya. As of 2007, it was subsumed within the enlarged Al Wahat District.

When Ajdabiya district was in existence from 2001 to 2007, it had, in the north, a short stretch of coastline on the Mediterranean Sea. On land, it bordered the following districts:

- Hizam al Akhdar - northeast
- Al Wahat - east
- Kufra - southeast
- Jufra - southwest
- Sirte - west

Ajdabiya district previously also existed from 1987 to 1995 when it covered a larger area, including all of the 2001-2007 Al Wahat District, and some additional area to the south.

== Towns and villages 2001-2007 ==
Ajdabiya, Al Hiri, Labba, Mawahi, El Agheila, Shawashina, Shurraf, Awjila, Zuwetina, Brega, Jalu, Jikharra, Marada, Masliwa, Qaryat Bishr, Rashida, and Sultan.
