= Ajdabiya–Kufra Road =

Road in Libya

Location
- Country: Libya

Highway system
- Transport in Libya

Ajdabiya–Kufra road is an asphalt road in Libya running from Ajdabiya in northeastern Libya to Kufra in the country's southeastern part. It is about 864 km (537 mi) long. The road is essential for traffic from and to Awjila, Jalu, Jikharra, and Kufra oases. Some parts of the road are in a bad condition. Between Jalu and Kufra (584 km apart), there is no significant human settlement.

The Ajdabiya–Awjila section was built from 1973–1975.

The Awjila–Kufra section was completed between 1976 and 1980.
