= Ibrahim Jadhran =

Ibrahim Jadran (Arabic: إبراهيم الجضران; born 1981) is a self imposed Libyan militia leader from Ajdabiya in eastern Libya. Born 1981 in Ajdabiya as the son of Sayyid Jidran, Ibrahim was arrested in February 2005 for organizing an armed group to oust Muammar Gaddafi. After spending six years in Libya's Abu Salim prison with his four brothers, he was released from prison in 2011 and subsequently participated as a rebel commander in the 2011 Libyan revolution.

In 2012, after the revolution, Jadhran was named a commander of the Petroleum Defense Guards, the government force protecting the national oil facilities. Jadhran became dissatisfied with the actions of the central government, accusing it of corruption and incompetence, and demanded more autonomy for the eastern provinces that hold the rich oil fields. He declared that he opposed the Muslim Brotherhood that held the central power in Tripoli, while detractors tried to link him to jihadists. He favors a federal relationship of the various provinces of Libya, where provinces would control their own resources, and the central government manages the military and foreign affairs.

In 2013, Jadhran set up the Cyrenaica Political Bureau and secured control of eastern ports, namely Sidra, Ras Lanuf and Zueitina. In August 2013, Jathran issued the “Ras Lanuf Declaration”, the declaration asks for the right to “govern our own affairs”. By October 2013, Jathran's militia, the Cyrenaica Self-Defense Force, was estimated to number 17,500 men.

In 2014, Jadhran attempted to sell oil excluding the central government. The MV Morning Glory was loaded with crude oil at Sidra and broke through a weak government blockade. As a result, Ali Zeidan, the prime minister of Libya, was ousted by the parliament led by a Muslim Brotherhood coalition. However, Jathran's success was short-lived. The US Ambassador, Deborah K. Jones declared Jadhran's actions to be a “theft from the Libyan people.” At the behest of the Libyan government, US forces took control of the ship on March 16, 2014, making it unlikely that Jadhran can sell oil without the permission of the central government.

On 10 September 2015 Ibrahim Jadhran accused the Libyan National Army of trying to assassinate him.

In September 2017, after being released from a Libyan prison in Nalut, Ibrahim reportedly arrived in Algeria.
