= Battle of El Agheila =

Brief engagement of the Western Desert Campaign of the Second World War

- Part of the Western Desert campaign of the Second World War
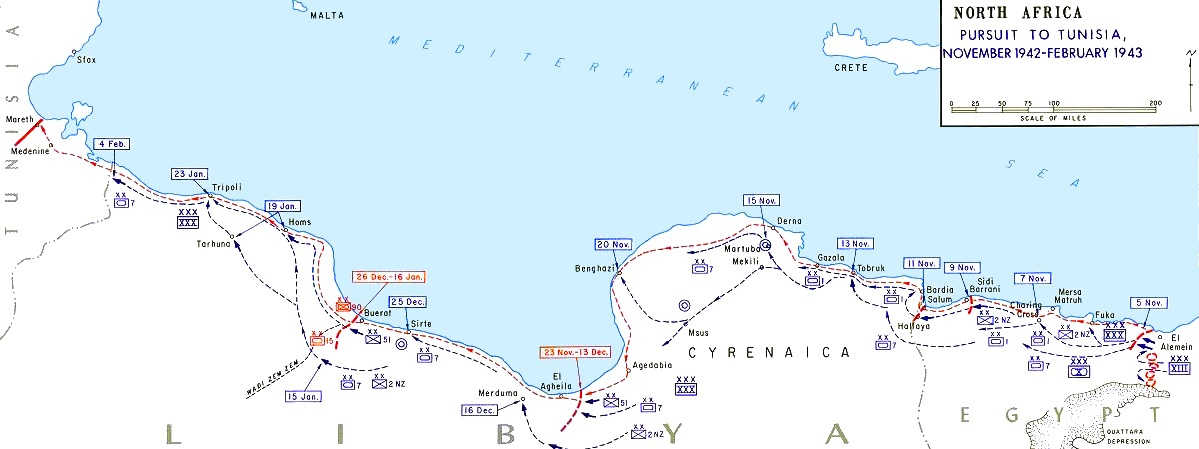
- The withdrawal of the Axis forces through North Africa
Date	11–18 December 1942 (Note: There is a one-day difference in the dates in Rommel's memoirs and those of his rearguard commander, Friedrich von der Heydte and the contributor has tried to reconcile the two sources.)
Location	El Agheila, Libya 30°16′N 19°12′E
Result	(see Analysis section)
Territorial changes	Axis forces retreated from Cyrenaica to Tripolitania.

Belligerents
United Kingdom; New Zealand	Italy; Germany

Commanders and leaders
(United Kingdom) Harold Alexander (United Kingdom) Bernard Montgomery	(Fascist Italy) Ettore Bastico (Nazi Germany) Erwin Rommel

Units involved
(United Kingdom) Eighth Army	(Nazi Germany) (Fascist Italy) Panzer Army Africa

Strength
	60,000 men 30 tanks 20 armoured cars 86 guns

The Battle of El Agheila was a brief engagement of the Western Desert Campaign of the Second World War. It took place in December 1942 between Allied forces of the Eighth Army (General Bernard Montgomery) and the Axis forces of the German-Italian Panzer Army (Generalfeldmarschall Erwin Rommel), during the long Axis withdrawal from El Alamein to Tunis. The Eighth Army planned to outflank and trap the Axis forces as they withdrew to Tunis.

The Eighth Army plan was thwarted when a frontal attack by the British 7th Armoured Division was repulsed by an Italian rearguard action and the outflanking New Zealand units became dispersed in the desert. The engagement ended with the German-Italian Panzer Army withdrawing into Tripolitana towards Tunisia, where the Tunisia Campaign had begun with the Operation Torch the Allied invasion of French North Africa (8–16 November 1942).

== Background ==
=== German–Italian retreat: Egypt ===
Area of Rommel's retreat from El Alamein to El Agheila, 4–23 November 1942

On 4 November 1942, Rommel decided to end the Second Battle of El Alamein and withdraw west towards Libya. In doing so, he defied the "Stand to the last" orders of Adolf Hitler, to save the remainder of his force. The Afrika Korps reached the village of Fuka the next day. Italian forces had arrived earlier, having withdrawn from El Alamein from 3 to 4 November and formed a defensive line. The Italians resumed their withdrawal on the same day, after an Allied attack and the Germans followed suit. Montgomery rested some of his formations after their efforts at El Alamein, leading with the 4th Light Armoured Brigade. Rain on the afternoon of 6 November impeded the Eighth Army pursuit as the Axis forces continued their withdrawal.

A new defence line was established at Mersa Matruh on the following day, some 110 mi (180 km) west of El Alamein. Rommel received a warning from Hitler of an expected Allied landing between Tobruk and Benghazi but on 8 November, he discovered that this was wrong. There were Anglo-American landings in Morocco and Algeria (Operation Torch). The Eastern Task Force—aimed at Algiers—landed with 20,000 troops and began moving east towards Rommel. Facing the prospect of a large Allied force to his rear, he decided to withdraw in one bound to El Agheila. Axis forces retired from Sidi Barrani on 9 November and Halfaya Pass (on the Libyan–Egyptian border) the last position in Egypt, on 11 November. Cyrenaica was abandoned without serious resistance.

=== German–Italian retreat: Cyrenaica ===
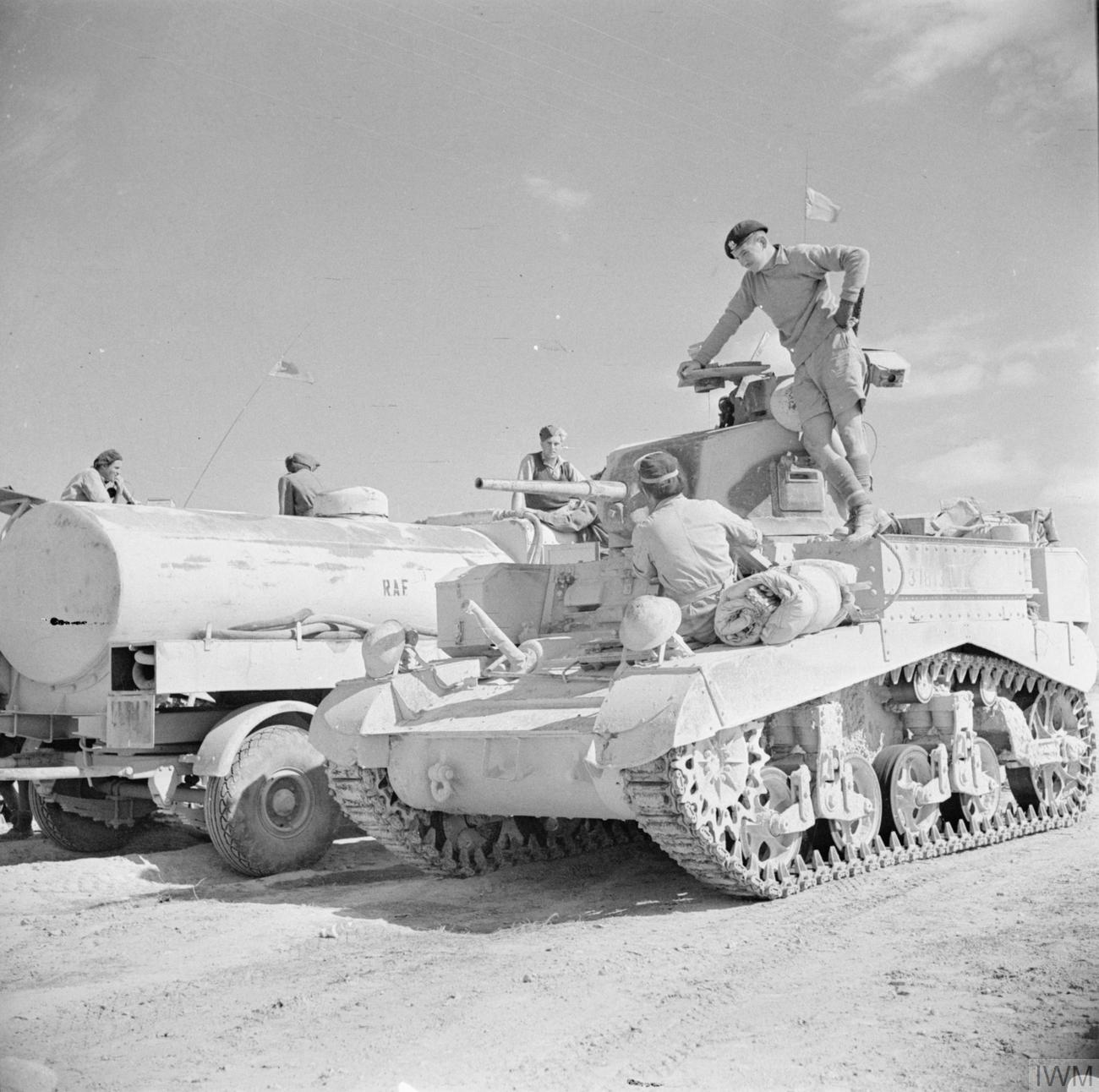
A Stuart light tank being refuelled from an RAF fuel bowser outside Sidi Barrani, 15 November 1942

Rommel wanted to save 10,000 short tons (9,100 t) of equipment in Tobruk but it fell to the Eighth Army on 13 November. An attempt by Montgomery to trap the Tobruk garrison by an encirclement toward Acroma, west of Tobruk, failed and the garrison retreated along the Via Balbia toward Benghazi with few losses. Derna and the airfield at Martuba were captured on 15 November and the RAF quickly occupied the airfield to provide air cover for Operation Stoneage, a Malta convoy, on 18 November. The Axis forces had withdrawn 400 mi (640 km) in ten days. Despite the importance of Benghazi to the Axis supply system, Rommel abandoned the port to avoid a repeat of the disastrous entrapment suffered by the Italians at the Battle of Beda Fomm in February 1941. Rommel ordered the demolition of port facilities and supplies in Benghazi, writing afterwards that

...in Benghazi, we destroyed the port facilities and platforms and the chaos overwhelmed the civilians in this miserable town.

— Rommel

Benghazi was occupied by the Eighth Army on 20 November and three days later, the Axis forces retreated from Agedabia to Mersa Brega. During their withdrawal to Mersa Brega, Axis forces faced many difficulties, including Allied air superiority. The Desert Air Force (DAF) attacked Axis columns that were crowded on the coast road and short of fuel. To delay the Eighth Army advance, Axis sappers laid mines in the Mersa Brega area; steel helmets were buried to create false readings on the mine detectors used by the Eighth Army.

For much of the pursuit to El Agheila, the Eighth Army commanders were uncertain of Rommel's intentions. They had been caught out in earlier campaigns by an opponent that had drawn them in and then counter-attacked. Montgomery had intended to build the morale of the Eighth Army by banishing the habit of defeat and retreat. The 1st Armoured Division and 2nd New Zealand Division were held at Bardia, resting and providing a defence. Despite Rommel's concerns of entrapment by a rapid Allied advance across the Cyrenaica bulge, Montgomery was aware that an extended and isolated force could also be vulnerable, as in early 1941 and early 1942. When a reconnaissance force of armoured cars was sent across country, it was delayed by waterlogged ground. Signals intelligence revealed to the Eighth Army that the Panzerarmee was virtually immobilised by lack of fuel, prompting Montgomery to order a stronger force to move cross-country. Having heard of the presence of the reconnaissance force, Rommel brought forward his retirement from Benghazi and was able to brush the armoured cars aside, untroubled by the stronger force which had yet to arrive.

== Prelude ==
=== German-Italian Panzer Army ===
During the eighteen days between the evacuation of Agedabia on 23 November and the beginning of the Battle of El Agheila on 11 December Rommel described disagreements with his political and military superiors and he engaged in fruitless bitter arguments with Hitler, Hermann Göring, the head of the Luftwaffe, General Albert Kesselring the Oberbefehlshaber Süd (OB Süd, commander of German units in the Mediterranean theatre), Ugo Cavallero the Italian chief of staff at Comando Supremo and the governor of Libya, Ettore Bastico. Rommel wanted to withdraw to Tunis as soon as possible and the others wanted him to make a stand on the El Agheila–Mersa Brega position. Mussolini ordered Rommel to stand on the Agheila line to defend Tripolitania and this was supported by Hitler, who ordered that El Agheila should be held "in all circumstances". Although the Agheila position was naturally strong, being surrounded by salt marshes, soft sand or broken ground and a "chain of minefields", restricting the ability of vehicles to manoeuvre.

Rommel judged that he would be able to hold the position only if he received artillery and tank replacements, if the Luftwaffe was strengthened and his fuel and ammunition supplies were restored. By this time, all available men and equipment were being diverted to Tunis, following the Allied landings of Operation Torch, to prevent Tunisia falling to the Allied advance from Algeria. By the time of Rommel's visit to Berlin at the beginning of December, Mussolini and Hitler had accepted the reality of the situation and agreed for preparations to be made for a withdrawal to Buerat, some 250 mi (400 km) to the west and by 3 December, the un-mechanised Italian infantry had begun a retirement. Rommel's supply position did not improve, Tunisia kept supply priority and of the ships which were sent to Tripoli to supply the Panzer Army in November, three-quarters had been sunk. Rommel was short of men and equipment and very short of fuel and ammunition. He intended to hold out as long as possible but to retire in the face of strong pressure.

=== Eighth Army ===
The Eighth Army had to supply their forces from Egypt to Agedabia. Supplies could be moved 440 mi (710 km) from Alexandria to Tobruk by rail, the 390 mi (630 km) from Tobruk to Agedabia was slightly shorter but supplies had to go by road on the Via Balbia or by sea to Benghazi and then by road to Agedabia. On 26 November, X Corps (Lieutenant-General Brian Horrocks) was taken into reserve and XXX Corps (Lieutenant-General Oliver Leese) took over the Eighth Army front line with the 7th Armoured Division (Major-General John Harding), 51st (Highland) Infantry Division (Major-General Douglas Wimberley) and the 2nd New Zealand Division (Major-General Sir Bernard Freyberg). At the end of November, Montgomery planned for the 2nd New Zealand Division with the 4th Light Armoured Brigade under command, to commence a wide outflanking movement on 13 December. The manoeuvre was to be masked by bombardments and infantry raids on the forward positions of the Panzerarmee, commencing on the night of 11/12 December, to divert attention. A frontal attack by the 51st (Highland) Division on the coast and the 7th Armoured Division inland on their left would begin on the night of 16/17 December, once the New Zealanders were in position behind the Axis position. Dakotas of the U.S. 316th Troop Carrier Command flew 130,000 imp gal (590,000 L; 160,000 US gal) of aviation fuel in drums from El Adem to supply the Desert Air Force. Air operations pushed Axis aircraft from their forward bases and bombers hit Tripoli harbour, other ports and Crete. Though about 20 Axis aircraft were shot down, over 500 were found abandoned on the ground during the advance to El Agheila. Aerial reconnaissance over El Agheila and on to Tripoli was constant.

== Battle ==
When preliminary attacks began on 11 December, Rommel took this to be the start of the Eighth Army's attack and began to withdraw. By mid morning on 12 December, patrols detected that the Axis were starting to thin out their positions. Montgomery ordered the New Zealand Division to move immediately and brought forward the main assault to the night of 14/15 December. By the evening of 12 December, the Axis withdrawal was under way, except for rearguards.

On 13 December, Axis reconnaissance aircraft discovered some 300 vehicles north of Marada oasis 75 mi (121 km) south of El Agheila (the New Zealand column), which meant for the Axis forces the danger of being outflanked. Rommel wished to launch his remaining armour at this outflanking force but was prevented by lack of fuel and ordered the withdrawal to continue. An attack by the 7th Armoured Division was repulsed in a rearguard action by the Italian Tactical Group Ariete. In his diary, Rommel wrote:

Late in the morning, a superior enemy force launched an attack on Tactical Group Ariete, which was located south-west of El Agheila, with its right flank resting on the Sebcha Chebira and its left linking up with 90th Light Division. Bitter fighting ensued against 80 British tanks and lasted for nearly ten hours. The Italians put up a magnificent fight, for which they deserved the utmost credit. Finally, in the evening, the British were thrown back by a counter attack of the Centauro's armoured regiment, leaving 22 tanks and 2 armoured cars burnt out or damaged on the battlefield. The British intention of cutting off the 90th Light Division had been foiled.

— Rommel

The Eighth Army change of plan had come too late and when the New Zealand Division completed their "left hook" on 15 December, they were dispersed after a difficult journey across difficult terrain which left them with only 17 serviceable tanks. They found the 15th Panzer Division on the escarpment guarding the coast road and the 6th New Zealand Brigade, further west, was ordered to form a block on the coast road, while the 5th Brigade protected the divisional supply and transport vehicles. During the night of 15/16 December, most of the remaining elements of the Panzer Army were able to withdraw towards Nofilia, moving in small fast columns through the gaps in the dispersed New Zealand units, under cover of dark. On 18 December, a brief engagement took place at Nofaliya (100 mi (160 km) west of El Agheila). The Eighth Army was not able to outflank the Axis force, which continued to withdraw westward.

== Aftermath ==
=== Analysis ===
Due to shortages of fuel, ammunition and equipment, Rommel had decided to withdraw rather than to make a determined stand at El Agheila and started withdrawing troops days before the battle. Montgomery intended to trap the Axis force by pinning them down with a frontal attack near the coast, while the New Zealand Division circled around Rommel's inland flank to cut the Via Balbia to the west of El Agheila. The New Zealand Division became dispersed during their encirclement attempt and when the Eighth Army started its frontal attack, Rommel commenced his final withdrawal. The last units of the Axis force escaped through the gaps between the scattered New Zealand units, and the planned entrapment failed.

The New Zealand official historian, W. G. Stevens, wrote that

...The high hopes of cutting off even some of the retreating enemy had come to nothing, partly because greater speed was possible along the road than across the desert, partly because the enemy was well seasoned and adopted the orthodox safeguards of flank and rear guards, and partly because of the difficulties of deploying by night in unknown country at the end of a long and tiring move...

Rommel later commented that experience should have told Montgomery that there was a good chance that

...we should not accept battle. He should not therefore have started bombarding our strong points and attacking our line until his outflanking force had completed its move and was in a position to advance on the coast road in timed co-ordination with the frontal attack.

=== Casualties ===
In 1962, W. G. Stevens, the author of the Official History of New Zealand in the Second World War 1939–45 volume Bardia to Enfidaville (1962), recorded 2nd Zealand Division casualties of 11 killed, 29 wounded and 8 prisoners. In 1966, Ian Playfair, the British official historian, gave an estimate of 450 Axis prisoners, 25 guns and 18 tanks destroyed from 13 to 17 December.

=== Subsequent operations ===
Rommel planned to defend the Gabes Gap in Tunisia, north-west of the pre-war French Mareth line, while 5th Panzer Army of Generaloberst Hans-Jürgen von Arnim, already in Tunisia, confronted the Allied First Army but had been ordered to hold the port of Buerat about 200 mi (320 km) to the east of Tripoli. The front was 400 mi (640 km) from Tobruk and with such difficulties of supply that the Eighth Army was unable to use all its units. Buerat was not strongly defended and despite intelligence of the state of the Axis forces, Montgomery paused until 16 January 1943, when the Eighth Army had a 4:1 superiority in infantry and a 7.5:1 advantage in tanks. Bombing began on 12 January and XXX Corps attacked on 15 January, picking its way along the coast road, through minefields, demolitions and booby-traps. The New Zealand Division and the 7th Armoured Division turned inland via Tarhuna, supply being provided by the RASC and the New Zealand Army Service Corps, the operation being dependent on the quick capture of the port. Rommel withdrew on 15 January and by 19 January had retired from Tripoli, after destroying the port. The Axis troops then conducted delaying actions into Tunisia. The 7th Armoured Division entered Tripoli on the night of 22/23 January and the Panzerarmee reached the Mareth line, another 200 mi (320 km) west, on 23 January.

== See also ==
- List of British military equipment of World War II
- List of German military equipment of World War II
- List of Italian Army equipment in World War II
