= Qaryat Bishr =

- Town
- Location in Libya
- Coordinates: 30°17′33″N 19°25′32″E
- Country: Libya
- Region: Cyrenaica
- District: Al Wahat
- Time zone: UTC+2 (EET)

Qaryat Bishr is a Mediterranean coastal town on the Gulf of Sidra in central-northeastern Libya. It is in the Al Wahat District of the Cyrenaica region.

Until 2007, Qaryat Bishr was part of the former Ajdabiya District.
