= Thermochromic ink =

Type of dye

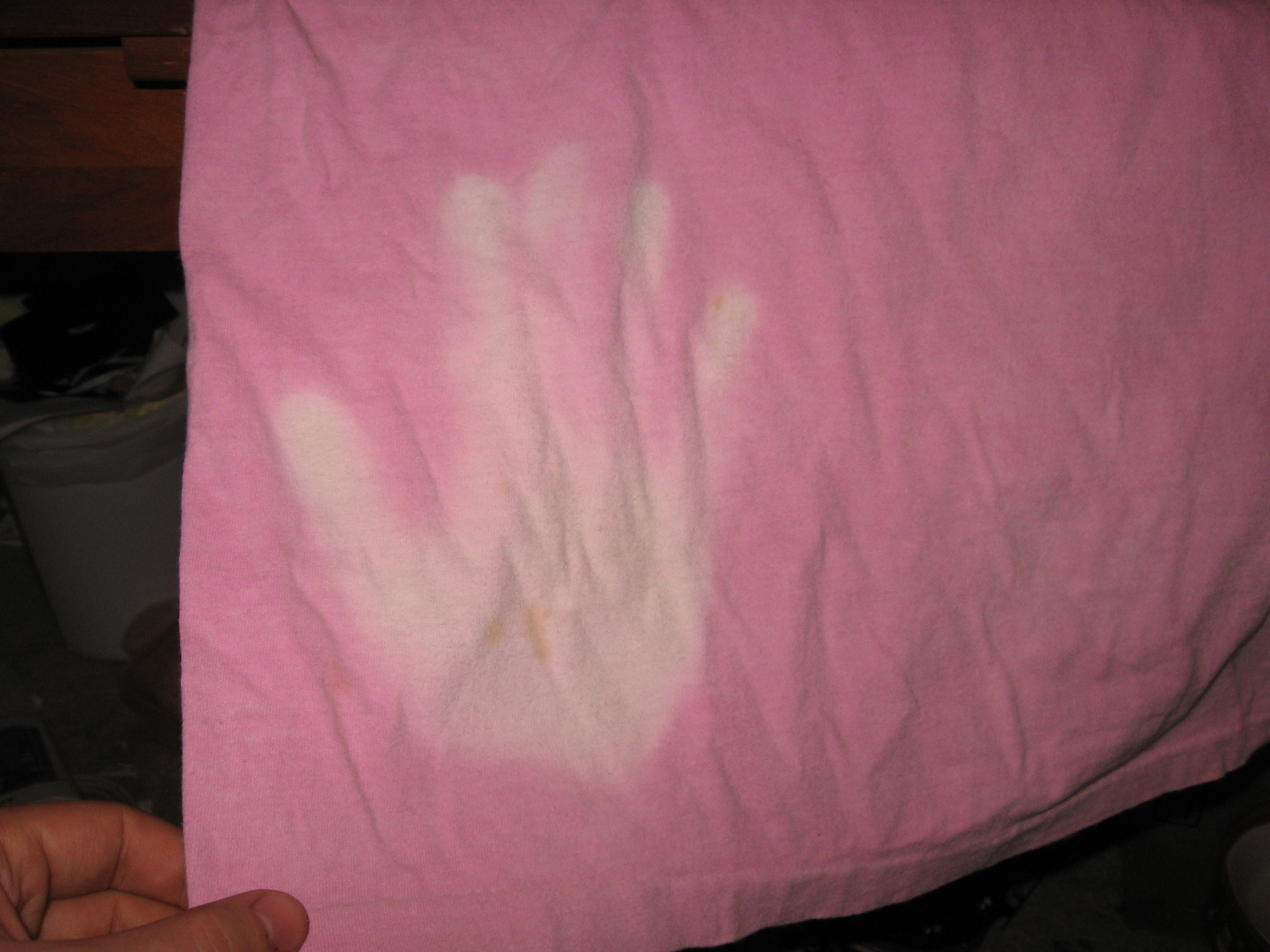
Thermochromism of clothing

Thermochromic ink (also called thermochromatic ink) is a type of dye that changes color in response to a change in temperature. It was first used in the 1970s in novelty toys like mood rings, but has found some practical uses in things such as thermometers, product packaging, and pens. The ink has also found applications within the medical field for specific medical simulations in medical training. Thermochromic ink can also turn transparent when heat is applied; an example of this type of ink can be found on the corners of an examination mark sheet to prove that the sheet has not been edited or photocopied.

== Composition ==
There are two main variants of thermochromic ink, one composed of leuco dyes and one composed of liquid crystals. For both types of ink, the chemicals need to be contained within capsules around 3 to 5 microns long. This protects the dyes and crystals from mixing with other chemicals that might affect the functionality of the ink.

=== Leuco dyes ===
The leuco dye variant is typically composed of leuco dyes with additional chemicals to add different desired effects. It is the most commonly used type because it is easier to manufacture. They can be designed to react to changes in temperature that range from -15 °C to 60 °C. Most common applications of the ink have activation temperatures at -10 °C (cold), 31 °C (body temperature), or 43 °C (warm). At lower temperatures, the ink appears to be a certain color, and once the temperature increases, the ink becomes either translucent or lightly colored, allowing hidden patterns to be seen. This gives the effect of a change in color, and the process can also be reversed by lowering the temperature again.

=== Liquid crystals ===
Liquid crystals can change from liquid to solid in response to a change in temperature. At lower temperatures, the crystals are mostly solid and hardly reflect any light, causing it to appear black. As it gradually increases in temperature, the crystals become more spaced out, causing light to reflect differently and changing the color of the crystals. The temperatures at which these crystals change their properties can range from -30 °C to 90 °C.

Irreversible thermochromic inks develop a permanent color change once heated above a defined activation temperature, typically between 60 °C and 200 °C, unlike reversible thermochromic ink, and are used in metal fabrication, annealing, and quality control applications. Thermochromic pigments can also be compounded directly into plastics as a masterbatch, allowing the color-changing effect to be built into the material itself rather than applied as a surface coating.

== Applications ==
On June 20, 2017, the United States Postal Service released the first application of thermochromic ink to postage stamps in its Total Eclipse of the Sun Forever stamp to commemorate the solar eclipse of August 21, 2017. When pressed with a finger, body heat turns the black circle in the center of the stamp into an image of the full moon. The stamp image is a photo of a total solar eclipse seen in Jalu, Libya, on March 29, 2006. The photo was taken by retired NASA astrophysicist Fred Espenak, aka "Mr. Eclipse".

=== Medical uses ===
In medical training, thermochromic ink can be used to imitate human blood because it shares its color changing property. It is currently being tested in medical simulations involving extracorporeal membrane oxygenation (ECMO). In these procedures, a change in color of blood between a dark and light red indicates blood oxygenation and blood deoxygenation, which describes the oxygen concentration levels within a person's blood sample. It's important to accurately identify this change in order to safely and correctly operate the ECMO machines. This has led to simulation-based trainings (SBT) which allows medical students to run simulations that mimic real ECMO machines before using them in serious situations. By using thermochromic ink in these simulations, the color changing effect can be realistically copied and observed without using real human blood or other costly methods.

Artificial blood or animal blood is typically used in these simulations; however, there are some advantages in using thermochromic ink as an alternative. It can be reused for multiple simulations with minimal variance in the outcomes and it is more cost effective. There are limitations to using this as the ink does not share any other properties with blood, so its only practical use is to observe the change in color of blood.

=== Product packaging ===
Product packaging is an important aspect of maintaining the quality of consumer goods. Modern day packaging is split into 2 categories; active packaging and smart packaging. Thermochromic ink has found use in smart packaging, which is the aspect of packaging that deals with monitoring the condition of the products. Since most consumer goods are affected by changes in temperature, using thermochromic ink as an indicator of those temperature changes allows consumers to recognize when the quality of a product has changed. It can also be used to tell consumers the right temperatures to consume the product.

=== Erasable ink pens ===
In 2006, Pilot Corporation, Japan developed a pen with erasable thermochromic ink. It was composed of a solvent, a colorant, and a resin film-forming agent. At temperatures below 65 °C, the ink stayed in a colored state. Once temperatures went above 65 °C, the ink began to melt and became colorless, creating the effect of erasable ink. The ink was able to return to its colored state by cooling the temperature down to below -10 °C.

== See also ==
- Thermochromism
- Security printing
- Active packaging
