= Shawashina =

Shawashina شواشينة
- Town
- Location in Libya
- Coordinates: 29°10′18″N 21°17′39″E
- Country: Libya
- Region: Cyrenaica
- District: Al Wahat
- Time zone: UTC+2 (EET)

Shawashina (Al Shawashina, Ash-Shawashinah) is a desert town in the Al Wahat District in the Cyrenaica region of northeastern Libya.

It was in the former Ajdabiya District until 2007.
