= Awjila =

Awjila أوجله Augila
- Town
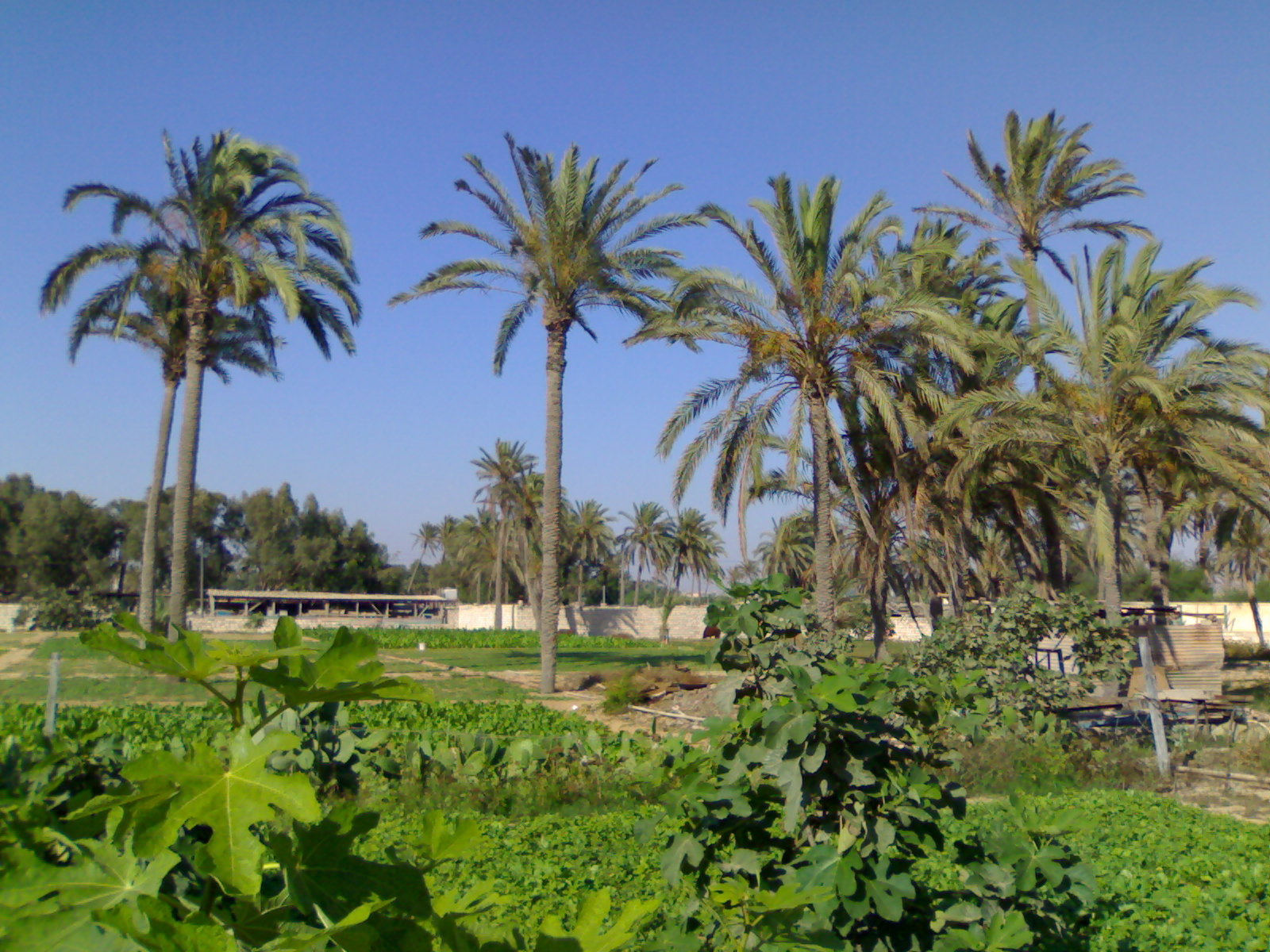
- A farm in Awjilah

- Location in Libya
- Coordinates: 29°6′29″N 21°17′13″E
- Country: Libya
- Region: Cyrenaica
- District: Al Wahat

Population (2006)
  - Total: 8,515
- Time zone: UTC+2 (EET)
- License Plate Code: 67

Awjila (Arabic: أوجلة, Italian: Augila) is an oasis town in the Al Wahat District in the Cyrenaica region of northeastern Libya. Since classical times it has been known as a place where high quality dates are farmed. Since the Arab conquest in the 7th century, Islam has played an important role in the community. The oasis is located on the east-west caravan route between Egypt and Tripoli, Libya, and the north-south route between Benghazi and the Sahel between Lake Chad and Darfur. In the past, it was an important trading center. The people cultivate small gardens using water from deep wells. Recently, the oil industry has become an increasingly important source of employment.

== Location ==
Awjila and the adjoining oasis of Jalu are isolated, the only towns on the desert highway between Ajdabiya, 250 kilometres (160 mi) to the northwest, and Kufra, 625 kilometres (388 mi) to the southeast. An 1872 account describes the cluster of three oases: the Aujilah oasis, Jalloo (Jalu) to the east and Leshkerreh (Jikharra) to the northeast. Each oasis had a small hill covered in date palm trees, surrounded by a plain of red sand impregnated with salts of soda. Among them, the three oases had a population of 9,000 to 10,000 people. The people of the oasis are mainly Berber, and some still speak a Berber-origin language. As of 2005, the Awjila language was highly endangered.

== Climate ==
Awjila has a hot desert climate (BWh) according to the Köppen climate classification.

Climate data for Awjila
Month	Jan	Feb	Mar	Apr	May	Jun	Jul	Aug	Sep	Oct	Nov	Dec	Year
Mean daily maximum °C (°F)	19.9 (67.8)	21.9 (71.4)	25.3 (77.5)	29.7 (85.5)	34.7 (94.5)	37.2 (99.0)	36.7 (98.1)	36.9 (98.4)	35.8 (96.4)	32.4 (90.3)	27.0 (80.6)	21.4 (70.5)	29.9 (85.8)
Mean daily minimum °C (°F)	5.6 (42.1)	7.0 (44.6)	9.2 (48.6)	13.1 (55.6)	18.3 (64.9)	19.9 (67.8)	21.0 (69.8)	21.0 (69.8)	19.9 (67.8)	16.3 (61.3)	12.0 (53.6)	7.7 (45.9)	14.3 (57.7)
Average precipitation mm (inches)	3 (0.1)	3 (0.1)	3 (0.1)	2 (0.1)	0 (0)	0 (0)	0 (0)	0 (0)	0 (0)	3 (0.1)	2 (0.1)	3 (0.1)	19 (0.7)
Source: Climate-data.org

== History ==
=== Classical times ===
The Awjila (Augila; Αὔγιλα) oasis is mentioned by Herodotus (c. 484 – 425 BC). He describes the nomadic Nasamones who migrated between the coasts of Syrtis Major and the Augila oasis, where they may have exacted tribute from the local people. Herodotus says it was a journey of ten days from the oasis of Ammonium, modern Siwa, to the oasis of Augila. This distance was confirmed by the German explorer Friedrich Hornemann (1772–1801), who covered the distance in nine days, although caravans normally take 13 days. In the summer the Nasamones left their flocks by the coast and travelled to the oasis to gather dates. There were other permanent inhabitants of the oasis.

Strabo writes that Augila resembles the oasis of Ammon, is productive of palm trees, is well supplied with water, and is reached on the fourth day by those directing their course from the recess of the Great Syrtis, from about the neighbourhood of Automala, in the direction of the winter sunrise.

Ptolemy (c. 90 – 168) implies that the Greek colonists had forced the Nasamones to leave the coast and take up residence in Augila. Procopius, writing around 562, says that even in his day sacrifices continued to be made to Ammon and to Alexander the Great of Macedon in two Libyan cities that were both called Augila. He was probably referring to what are now El Agheila on the Gulf of Sirte and the oasis of Awjilah. According to Procopius the temples of the oasis were converted into Christian churches by the Byzantine Emperor Justinian I (c. 482 – 565). The 6th-century geographer Stephanus of Byzantium described Augila as a city.

=== Early Arab era ===
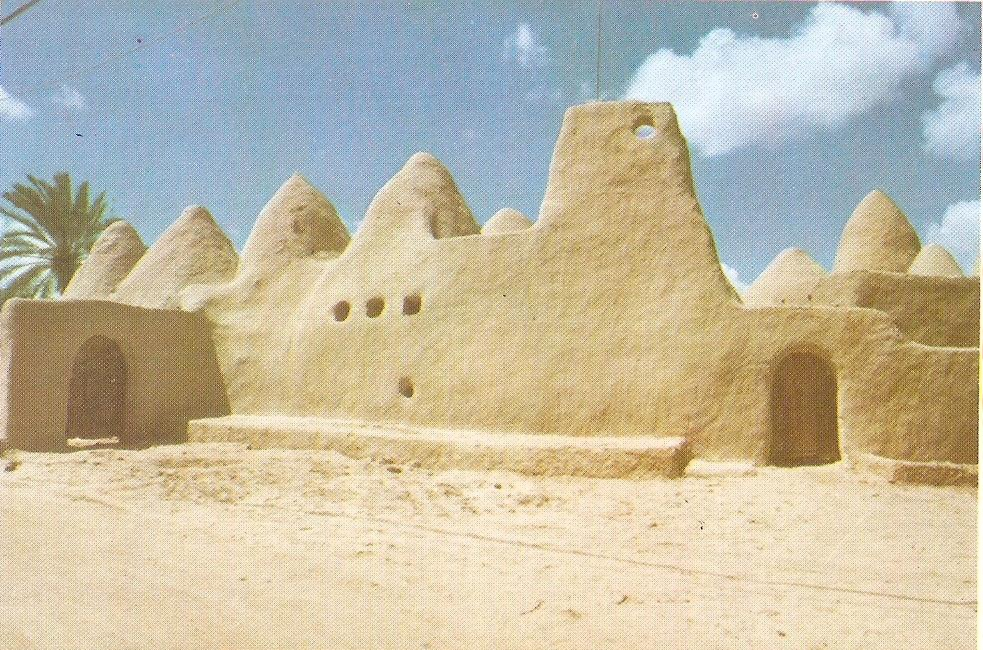
12th-century Grand mosque of Atik, Awjilah

The Arabs launched a campaign against the Byzantine Empire soon after Muhammad died in 632, quickly conquering Syria, Persia and Egypt. After occupying Alexandria in 643, they swept along the Mediterranean coast of Africa, taking Cyrenaica in 644, Tripolitania in 646 and Fezzan in 663.

The region around Awjila was conquered by Sidi ‘Abdullāh ibn Sa‘ad ibn Abī as-Sarḥ. He was a companion of Muhammad and standard bearer, and an important saint. His tomb was established in Awjila around 650. A modern structure has since replaced the original tomb. The Sarahna family, who consider themselves the family of Sidi Abdullah, are the protectors of his tomb. When the Senussi center was established in Awjila in 1872, the Sarahna assumed the role of Islamic teachers.

After being introduced in the 7th century, Islam has always been a major influence on the life of the oasis. The Arab chronicler Al-Bakri says that there were already several mosques around the oasis by the 11th century. According to oral tradition, in the 12th century a learned man from the coast of Tripolitania said that there were forty shrines in Awjila, and forty saints hidden among the people of the oasis. By the late 1960s only sixteen shrines remained. Some of the saints in the surviving tombs lived during the early years of Islam, and the details of their life and even their family lineage have been forgotten.

=== Trading centre ===
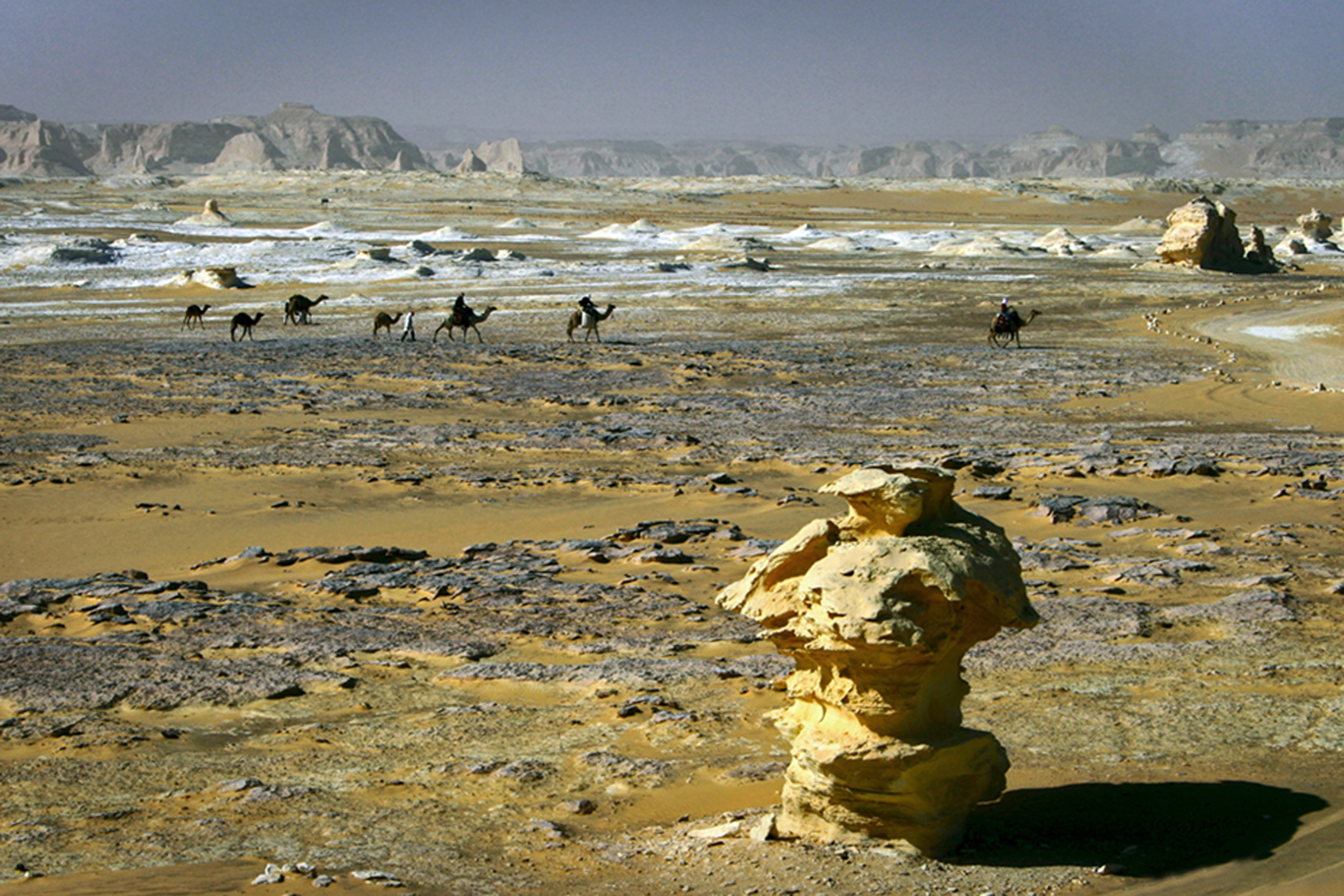
Caravan in the Farafra desert to the east of Awjila

In the 10th century Awjila was a stage on the trading route between the Ibadi Berber capital of Zuwayla (Note: The medieval gate of Bab Zuweila in Cairo takes its name from Zuwayla.) in the Fezzan and the newly established Fatimid capital of Cairo in Egypt. The east-west caravan route from Cairo to Tripoli, the Fezzan and Tunis went via Jaghbub, Jalu and Awjila. In the early Mamluk era (13th century), trade from Egypt was along a route that led via Awjila to the Fezzan, and then on to Kanem, Bornu and to cities such as Timbuktu on the Niger bend. Awjila became the main market for slaves from these regions. Most of these slaves supplied domestic needs. Gold was purchased from Bambouk and Bouré in what is now Senegal but then was part of the Mali Empire of the Mandinka people. In exchange, Egypt exported textiles.

During the Ottoman period in Egypt, Awjila lay on the route taken by pilgrims traveling from Timbuktu via Ghat, Ghadames and the Fezzan, avoiding the main Ottoman centers. In 1639 Awjila came under the rule of the Turkish ruler of Tripolitania, who stationed a permanent garrison at Benghazi. In the 18th century, the merchants of Awjila held a monopoly over the trade between Cairo and the Fezzan. Describing the trade between Egypt and Hausaland, Hornemann lists:

... slaves of both sexes, ostrich feathers, zibette (musk from civet cats), tiger skins (sic), and gold, partly in dust, partly in native grains, to be manufactured into rings and other ornaments for the people of interior Africa. From Bornu, copper is imported in great quantity. Cairo sends silks, melayes (striped blue and white calicoes - i.e. milayat, wrappers, sheeting) woolen cloths, glass... beads for bracelets, and an... assortment of East India goods... The merchants of Bengasi usually join the caravan from Cairo at Augila, import tobacco manufactured for chewing, or snuff, and sundry wares fabricated in Turkey...

Caravan routes in Libya, 19th century. Awjila and Jalu in the northeast

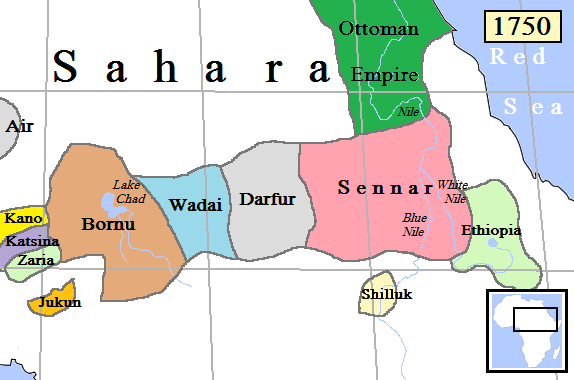
States to the south with whom caravans from Awjila traded.

Around 1810 a Majabra trader from Jalu named Schehaymah became lost while travelling to Wadai via Murzuk in the Fezzan. He was found by some Bidayat, who took him via Ounianga to Wara, the old capital of Wadai. The Sultan of Wadai, Abd al-Karim Sabun (1804–1815) agreed with Schehaymah's proposal to open a caravan route to Benghazi along a direct route through Kufra, and Awjila / Jalu. This new route would bypass both Fezzan and Darfur, states that until then had controlled the eastern Saharan trade. The first caravans travelled the route between 1809 and 1820.

The trade was disrupted for a while in the 1820s due to political instability in Wadai, but starting in the 1830s every two or three years a caravan would travel the route. Usually there were two or three hundred camels carrying ivory and skins, along with a batch of slaves. Trade increased from the 1860s. The main stations between Benghazi and the southern terminal at Abéché were the assembly point at Awjila / Jalu where the caravans were made up, and the center at Kufra where food and water could be obtained. Later the north-south route again grew in importance due to disruption of traffic on the Nile by the Mahdist revolution in the Sudan.

Muhammad ibn Ali as-Senussi stayed in Jalu and Awjila before opening his first lodge in al-Baida in 1843. Over the next ten years the lodges of the Senussi became established throughout the Bedouins of Cyrenaica. Later they spread the Senussi influence further south, helping quell violence and resolve trade disputes. Each post on the north-south route, including Awjila, was protected by a Senussi sheikh. As late as 1907, a significant amount of the trade passing through Benghazi was in goods carried over this route, and goods would also have been routed from interior points such as Awjila and Jalu east to Egypt and west to Tripoli.

== Recent years ==
Today the main activities of the people in Awjila are agriculture and working for the oil sector companies, as this area is the cradle of Libyan wealth. The main crops are dates from the many varieties of palm trees, tomatoes, and cereals. The Awjila oasis is known for the high quality of its dates. Starting in the 1960s, the oil industry drove growth in the once-sleepy village. In 1968 the population of the village was about 2,000 people, but by 1982 it had risen to over 4,000, supported by twelve mosques. A 2007 travel guide gives the population as 6,790.

The Great Mosque of Atiq is the oldest mosque in the Sahara with its unique style of architecture with rooms that are naturally air conditioned. In the scorching heat of the summer days the rooms are cool and at night they are warm. The oasis was a destination for viewing the Solar eclipse of March 29, 2006.
