= 2017 Total Solar Eclipse stamp =

US Postal Service stamp of a Solar Eclipse

Total Eclipse of the Sun stamp
- Country of production: United States of America
- Location of production: Browns Summit, North Carolina
- Designer: Antonio Alcalá
- Printer: Banknote Corporation of America
- Dimensions: 31.12 mm × 31.12 mm (1.225 in × 1.225 in)
- Perforation: Die cut
- Commemorates: Solar eclipse of August 21, 2017
- Depicts: A total solar eclipse
- Notability: First U.S. stamp using thermochromic ink
- Estimated value: 49¢

The United States Postal Service issued the Total Eclipse of the Sun Forever stamp on June 20, 2017. The stamp includes two superimposed images, one showing a total solar eclipse and the second showing a full moon that is revealed upon heat being applied. This stamp commemorates the solar eclipse of August 21, 2017, which was visible across the continental United States from coast to coast, weather permitting.

== Details ==
In the first U.S. stamp application of thermochromic ink, the Total Eclipse of the Sun Forever stamps reveal a second image. By rubbing a thumb or finger on the image, the heat imparted will cause an underlying image of the full moon to be revealed. Afterward, the image reverts to the dark image as it cools.

The US Postal Service notes that exposure to ultraviolet (UV) light causes degradation of thermochromic inks, so the eclipse stamps should be shielded from sunlight to preserve their thermochromic behavior. To help with this, the Postal Service sends panes of this stamp to purchasers in special UV-blocking envelopes. In addition, UV-protective sleeves for the eclipse stamps are available from post offices for 25¢ each.

The photograph of the total solar eclipse on the stamp was taken at Jalu, Libya on March 29, 2006, by Fred Espenak. The stamp's alternate image is a photo of the full moon taken by Espenak at his observatory in Portal, Arizona in 2010. Known as "Mr. Eclipse", Espenak is a retired NASA astrophysicist. The stamp was designed by USPS art director Antonio Alcalá of Alexandria, Virginia.

The stamp is printed in a pressure-sensitive adhesive pane of 16 stamps, in one design.

== Denomination ==
The stamp is a Forever stamp, so it has no defined denomination. This means it will always be equal in value to the current First-Class Mail 1-ounce price, regardless of any future rate changes.

== First day ceremony ==
The stamp's First-Day-of-Issue ceremony took place on June 20, 2017, at the University of Wyoming's Art Museum in conjunction with its annual summer solstice celebration. That building was designed with an architectural feature whereby, on the day of the summer solstice each year, a single beam of sunlight moves across the floor and shines on a silver dollar embedded in the floor in the center of the Rotunda Gallery at noon.

== See also ==
- Commemorative stamp
- Thermochromism
- Eclipses in mythology and culture
