= Al Hiri =

Village in Al Wahat district, Libya

- Town
- Location in Libya
- Coordinates: 29°3′N 21°31′E
- Country: Libya
- Region: Cyrenaica
- District: Al Wahat
- Time zone: UTC+2 (EET)

Al Hiri is a town in the Al Wahat District in the Cyrenaica region of northeastern Libya. From 2001 to 2007 it was part of Ajdabiya District. It was formerly (1983–1987) part of the Jalu District (baladiyah) in the country's northeast.
