= Rashida, Libya =

Rashida اَلرَّشِيدَة Rasceda
- Village
- Location in Libya
- Coordinates: 29°1′N 21°31′E
- Country: Libya
- Region: Cyrenaica
- District: Al Wahat
- Time zone: UTC+2 (EET)

Rashida (Rasceda) is a desert village in the Jalo oasis of the Al Wahat District in the Cyrenaica region in northeastern Libya. It lies approximately 3.7 kilometres (2.3 miles) southwest of the town of Jalu. According to a report from 1951, the population was approximately 600.
