= MV Morning Glory =

Vessel launched in 1993

History
- Name: Morning Glory (formerly Gulf Glory, Bandar Ayu, Pergiwati)
- Owner: National Oil Corporation, Libya or other unknown
- Operator: unknown
- Port of registry: unknown
- Completed: 1993
- Identification: Callsign: HMVE7; IMO number: 9044504
- Notes: As rogue vessel captured by US Navy SEALs on 16 March 2014

General characteristics
- Type: Oil tanker
- Tonnage: 21,804 GT; 35,583 DWT
- Length: 179.9 m (590 ft 3 in)
- Beam: 28.1 m (92 ft 2 in)

MV Morning Glory, formerly Gulf Glory, Bandar Ayu, and Pergiwati, is a 1993-built crude oil tanker. Considered a stateless vessel with stolen cargo, the tanker was seized by United States Special Operations Forces southeast of Cyprus in the eastern Mediterranean Sea on March 16, 2014. The intervention occurred upon the request of the Libyan and Cypriot governments.

As Gulf Glory the vessel had previously sailed under Liberian registry. In 2011, the Morning Glory was repaired at the CIC Changxing Shipyard, China.

== March 2014 event ==
The tanker had been ordered to Libyan waters off the port of Sidra, Libya where it was seized by rebel gunmen. Flying the flag of North Korea the vessel then entered the port of Sidra in early March 2014. North Korea, however, disavowed the ship once it learned that it was under rebel control. Sidra is under the control of an eastern Libyan militia group that under the leadership of Ibrahim Jathran defies the central government and aims for greater autonomy. At Sidra, the tanker was loaded with 234,000 barrels (37,200 m^{3}) of state-owned crude oil that had been seized by the rebels.

The Libyan government intended to prevent the ship from leaving the port on March 11 but failed to establish an effective blockade. As a result, the Ali Zeidan government collapsed. Fearing for his safety Zeidan then fled the country. The rebels had planned to sell the oil bypassing the Libyan government, however, the intervention on sea blocked this attempt. The oil tanker was seized by a U.S. Navy SEAL team and U.S. SWCC from USS Roosevelt on March 16, 2014, without bloodshed. The vessel was brought to the port of Zawiya, Libya and handed over to Libyan authorities on March 22, 2014, after being escorted by USS Elrod.
