= Shurraf =

- Town
- Location in Libya
- Coordinates: 29°3′N 21°31′E
- Country: Libya
- Region: Cyrenaica
- District: Al Wahat
- Time zone: UTC+2 (EET)

Shurraf (Al Shurraf, Ash-Shurraf) is a desert town in Al Wahat District, Cyrenaica region, in northeastern Libya.

From 1983-1987, it was part of the Jalu District (baladiyah) and from 2001 to 2007 of Ajdabiya District.
