= Sultan, Libya =

Village in Al Wahat district, Libya

Sultan سلطان
- Town
- Location in Libya
- Coordinates: 31°5′35″N 20°13′25″E
- Country: Libya
- Region: Cyrenaica
- District: Al Wahat
- Time zone: UTC+2 (EET)

Sultan (Arabic: سلطان) is a coastal town in the Al Wahat District, Cyrenaica region, in north-eastern Libya.

From 1983 to 1995 and again from 2001 to 2007 it was part of the District of Ajdabiya.
