= USS Elrod =

US Navy Oliver Hazard Perry-class frigate

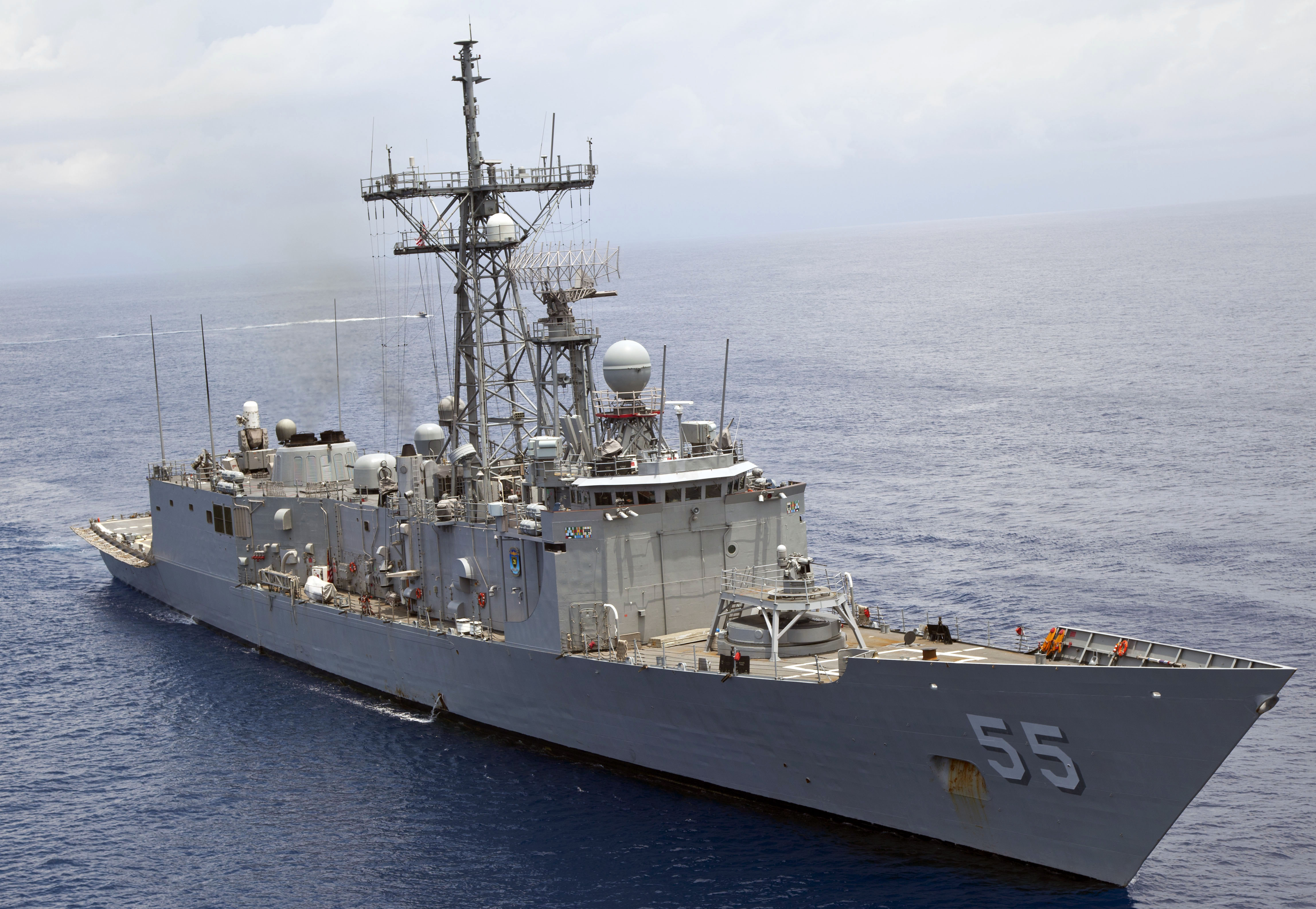
- USS Elrod (FFG-55) in 2012.

History

United States
- Name: Elrod
- Namesake: Major Henry T. Elrod
- Awarded: 22 May 1981
- Builder: Bath Iron Works, Bath, Maine
- Laid down: 21 November 1983
- Launched: 12 May 1984
- Sponsored by: Mrs. Norma J. McDonald
- Commissioned: 21 September 1985
- Decommissioned: 30 January 2015
- Stricken: 30 January 2015
- Home port: NS Norfolk, Virginia
- Identification: Hull symbol:FFG-55; Code letters:NHTE
- Motto: War Ready to Preserve Peace
- Nickname(s): Hammerin' Hank
- Status: Stricken, to be disposed of
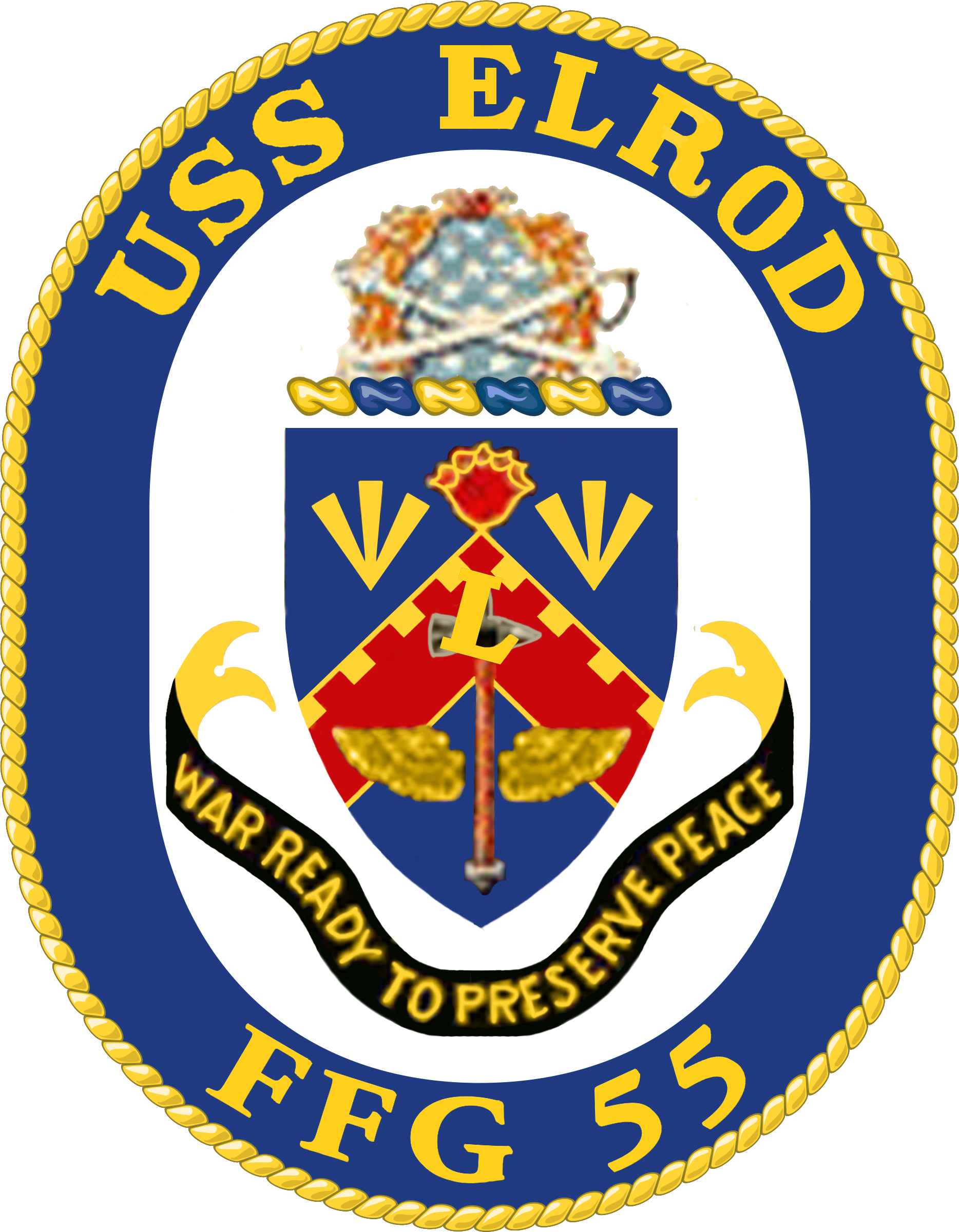
- Badge

General characteristics
- Class & type: Oliver Hazard Perry-class guided missile frigate
- Displacement: 4,100 long tons (4,200 t), full load
- Length: 453 feet (138 m), overall
- Beam: 45 feet (14 m)
- Draft: 22 feet (6.7 m)
- Propulsion: 2 × General Electric LM2500-30 gas turbines generating 41,000 shp (31 MW) through a single shaft and variable pitch propeller; 2 × Auxiliary Propulsion Units, 350 hp (260 kW) retractable electric azimuth thrusters for maneuvering and docking.
- Speed: over 29 knots (54 km/h)
- Range: 5,000 nautical miles at 18 knots (9,300 km at 33 km/h)
- Complement: 15 officers and 190 enlisted, plus SH-60 LAMPS detachment of roughly six officer pilots and 15 enlisted maintainers
- Sensors & processing systems: AN/SPS-49 air-search radar; AN/SPS-55 surface-search radar; CAS and STIR fire-control radar; AN/SQS-56 sonar.
- Electronic warfare & decoys: AN/SLQ-32
- Armament: As built: 1 × OTO Melara Mk 75 76 mm/62 caliber naval gun; 2 × Mk 32 triple-tube (324 mm) launchers for Mark 46 torpedoes; 1 × Vulcan Phalanx CIWS; 4 × .50-cal (12.7 mm) machine guns.; 1 × Mk 13 Mod 4 single-arm launcher for Harpoon anti-ship missiles and SM-1MR Standard anti-ship/air missiles (40 round magazine); Note: As of 2004, Mk 13 systems removed from all active US vessels of this class.; Mk 38 Mod 2 in place of Mk 13
- Aircraft carried: 2 × SH-60B LAMPS Mk III helicopters
- Aviation facilities: 2 × hangars; RAST helicopter hauldown system

USS Elrod (FFG-55), an Oliver Hazard Perry-class frigate, is a ship of the United States Navy named after Captain Henry T. Elrod (1905–1941), a Marine aviator who was posthumously awarded the Medal of Honor for his heroism in the defense of Wake Island in World War II.

The ship was originally home ported in Charleston, SC and shifted to Norfolk, VA in March 1995. Elrod completed five deployments to the Persian Gulf, three to the Mediterranean Sea, and one to the Adriatic Sea, and has participated in numerous operations in the Atlantic Ocean, the Mediterranean Sea, the Black Sea and the Caribbean Sea.

== Built in Bath, Maine ==
Elrod was laid down on 21 November 1983 at Bath, Maine, by Bath Iron Works; launched on 12 May 1984; sponsored by Mrs. Norma J. McDonald, wife of Admiral Wesley L. McDonald, Commander Atlantic Fleet and Commander Atlantic Command; and commissioned on 18 May 1985.

== Service history ==
During her maiden Middle East Force (MEF) deployment, Elrod's primary duties were oil tanker escort in support of Operation Earnest Will and providing additional protection for U.S. forces in the Persian Gulf. Elrod participated in numerous Earnest Will escort missions whereby U.S. surface combatants provided security to U.S. flagged tankers from the Gulf of Oman ("Goo"), through the Strait of Hormuz, to Kuwaiti ports. The U.S. escorts provided surface and air protection while Kuwaiti flagged tugs, with minesweeping gear, provided mine protection. In the NAG, Elrod's protective envelope, as well as logistics support, included mobile sea bases "Hercules" and "Wimbrown VII." Hercules and Wimbrown VII were Special Operating Force (SOF) barges whose personnel were assigned to protect a 100 nm stretch of the NAG from mine laying by Iranian forces station at Farsi Island. During this cruise, Elrod set the record for the number of flight hours achieved for a two-plane detachment during a six-month deployment.

An Iranian speedboat attacked South Korean tanker Hyundai No. 7 with rocket-propelled grenades near Abū Mūsá, 20 miles southwest of Sharjar, on 25 December 1987. Elrod, patrolling the Persian Gulf, launched Magnum 442, an SH-60B manned by pilot Lt. Neil W. T. Hogg, copilot Lt. Gregory P. Curth, and aircrewmen Aviation Antisubmarine Warfare Operator 2nd Class Charles Crissman and Aviation Antisubmarine Warfare Operator Airman Robert Bauch of Helicopter Antisubmarine Squadron (Light) (HSL) 44 Detachment 3. Magnum 442 rescued 11 of the 20 crewmembers and flew them to British frigate Scylla. A Westland Lynx HAS.3 from Scylla recovered the remaining nine people.

Elrod's third Persian Gulf deployment followed Operation Desert Storm and supported aggressive air and surface surveillance operations. Elrod conducted naval exercises with units of Gulf Cooperation Council nations to strengthen and further develop the bonds that were forged during Desert Shield and Desert Storm. The ship participated in TEAMWORK '92, NATO's Arctic Ocean anti-submarine exercise, and Operation Sharp Guard, in support of multi-national enforcement of United Nations sanctions and embargoing war materials to the Balkans. Elrod demonstrated America's commitment to her NATO allies by providing a presence among the Standing Naval Forces Mediterranean (SNFM) and Standing Naval Forces Atlantic (SNFL) during Operation Enduring Freedom. Recently, Elrod completed another NATO deployment in 2004 in support of Operation Active Endeavor.

Elrod deployed again in 2008, 2010, and 2012.

Pakistani fishing vessel Al An Wari sank in the Gulf of Aden on 2 July 2010. On 5 July, a Lockheed P-3C Orion of Patrol Squadron VP-16, forward-deployed to Djibouti, spotted the 16 survivors in a life raft about 144 miles west of Socotra Island. The Orion directed an SH-60B flying from Elrod to the area. The Seahawk rescued 12 of the mariners and the frigate reached the area and saved the remaining four men.

Her 2012 Caribbean deployment resulted in the confiscation of record amounts of illegal narcotics.

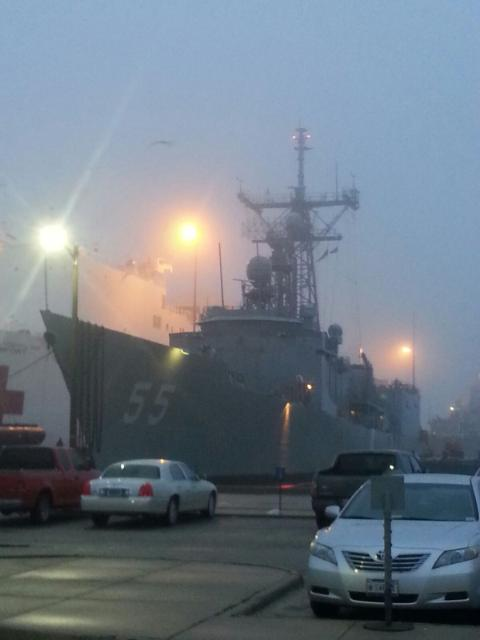
USS ELROD one month prior to her decommissioning at Naval Station Norfolk. USNS Comfort and USS Gonzales are visible in the background

The ship made her final deployment during a voyage to the Sixth Fleet in 2014, during which she steamed in the central Mediterranean as part of NATO's Operation Active Endeavour, patrols in support of the global war on terrorism, with the Northrop Grumman MQ-8 Fire Scout. Three armed Libyans seized commercial tanker Morning Glory, which Rear Admiral John Kirby, Pentagon Press Secretary, called a "stateless vessel," early in March 2014. The ship carried oil owned by the Libyan government's National Oil Corporation, but illicitly obtained from that country's port of As-Sidra. The Libyan and Cypriot governments requested assistance. In addition to Elrod, the destroyers Roosevelt and Stout, deployed as part of Carrier Strike Group 2, were tasked to assist. A Sea, Air, Land (SEAL) team, attached to Special Operations Command Europe, was also deployed to Roosevelt. Just after 1500 on 16 March, the SEALs boarded and took control of Morning Glory in international waters just southeast of Cyprus, capturing the hijackers and freeing the crewmembers. Stout dispatched a team of sailors that boarded the tanker and relieved the SEALs, and which then helped sail the ship to Libyan waters. Elrod relieved Stout on 19 March. Elrod turned Morning Glory over to the Libyan authorities in international waters outside Libya, and they brought the ship into Zawiya, Libya, on 22 March.

Elrod was decommissioned at Naval Station Norfolk, Virginia, on 30 January 2015. The ship is slated to be offered in foreign military sales.

== Awards ==
In addition to a reputation for operational readiness and fighting skills, Elrod had earned a reputation for community support and participation in charitable projects. The ship has been recognized for the crew's contributions by designation as a Presidential "Point of Light". Elrod had also earned numerous awards during her commissioned service, including the Joint Meritorious Unit Award, Navy Meritorious Unit Commendation, Coast Guard Meritorious Unit Commendation, Armed Forces Expeditionary Medal, Humanitarian Service Medal, several Battle Efficiency Excellence Awards, Secretary of the Navy Energy Conservation Award, Armed Forces Recreation Society Award and various departmental and mission-specific awards for excellence.
