= Zuwetina =

Zuwetina الزويتينة
- Town
- Location in Libya
- Coordinates: 30°57′08″N 20°7′13″E
- Country: Libya
- Region: Cyrenaica
- District: Al Wahat
- Elevation: 16 ft (5 m)

Population (2004)
  - Total: 21,015
- Time zone: UTC+2 (EET)

Zuwetina or Zuetine ( Marsa Uasili; Arabic: الزويتينة) is a coastal town and oil-exporting port in the Al Wahat District of the Cyrenaica region in northeastern Libya. From 1987 to 2007, Zuwetina was in the former Ajdabiya District.

The oil terminal in the small harbor is operated by the Zuwetina Oil Company. The town's primary activities relate to oil production and transshipping crude oil. It is about 180 km southwest of Benghazi. The port has the capacity to store 4.3 million barrels of crude oil, 986,000 barrels of naphtha, 136,000 barrels of liquefied butane gas and 86,000 barrels of liquefied propane gas.

The port was the site of skirmishes between pro- and anti-Gaddafi forces during the 2011 Libyan civil war. Since the fall of the Gaddafi regime, there have been multiple strikes and environmental conflict disruptions due to conflict over the production of oil. In 2022, the National Oil Corporation said that damage from the course of the war, meant that the facilities at the site were vulnerable to potential spills.
