= Marada, Libya =

Marada مرادة Maratha (مَراثَة)
- Town
- Location in Libya
- Coordinates: 29°14′N 19°13′E
- Country: Libya
- Region: Cyrenaica
- District: Al Wahat

Population (2006)
  - Total: 2,229
- Time zone: UTC+2 (EET)

Marada (Arabic: مرادة) is a desert oasis in the Al Wahat District, Cyrenaica region, in northeastern Libya.

Although Marada is located 120 km (75 mi) south of El Agheila, the dilapidated condition of the El Agheila-Marada road compels travelers to use much longer routes to get to Marada.
