= Labba, Libya =

Labba Al Labbah
- Town
- Location in Libya
- Coordinates: 29°2′N 21°34′E
- Country: Libya
- Region: Cyrenaica
- District: Al Wahat
- Time zone: UTC+2 (EET)

Labba (Al Labbah) is a desert town in the Al Wahat District in the Cyrenaica region of northeastern Libya.

It was part of Jalu District from 1983 to 1987 and of Ajdabiya District from 2001 to 2007.
