= Mawahi =

- Town
- Location in Libya
- Coordinates: 29°29′N 22°29′E
- Country: Libya
- Region: Cyrenaica
- District: Al Wahat
- Time zone: UTC+2 (EET)

Mawahi (Al Mawāḩī) is an oasis town in the western desert of Al Wahat District in northeastern Libya. It is in the northern desert area of the Cyrenaica region.

Mawahi has been in Al Wahat District since 1998.
