= Masliwa =

Village in Al Wahat district, Libya

- Town
- Location in Libya
- Coordinates: 29°3′N 21°30′E
- Country: Libya
- Region: Cyrenaica
- District: Al Wahat
- Time zone: UTC+2 (EET)

Masliwa is a Sahara desert town in the Al Wahat District in the Cyrenaica region of northeastern Libya.
