= El Agheila =

El Agheila العقيلة al-ʿUqayla
- Town
- Location in Libya
- Coordinates: 30°15′21″N 19°11′58″E
- Country: Libya
- Region: Cyrenaica
- District: Al Wahat
- Time zone: UTC+2 (EET)

El Agheila (Arabic: العقيلة, romanized: al-ʿUqayla) is a coastal city at the southern end of the Gulf of Sidra and Mediterranean Sea in far western Cyrenaica, Libya. In 1988 it was placed in Ajdabiya District; remaining there until 1995. It was removed from Ajdabiya District in 1995 but in 2001 it was placed back into Ajdabiya District. In 2007, El Agheila was placed within the enlarged Al Wahat District.

El Agheila is best known as the site of several Second World War battles during the North African Campaign.

== History ==
=== Ancient ===
El Agheila is the site of the Roman fortified town of Anabucis and its Greek precursor Automala (Αὐτόμαλα) or Automalaka (Αὐτομάλακα).

Ophellas, ruler of Cyrenaica, encamped at Automala during his march to join Agathocles of Syracuse in the campaign against Carthage (309/8 BC).

=== Modern ===
During the Italian occupation of Libya, the town was the site of an Italian concentration camp for Bedouins. The camp was just south of town and housed over 10,000 inmates. Thousands of the Bedouins starved to death in the camp run by the Italian colonial troops.

==== World War II ====
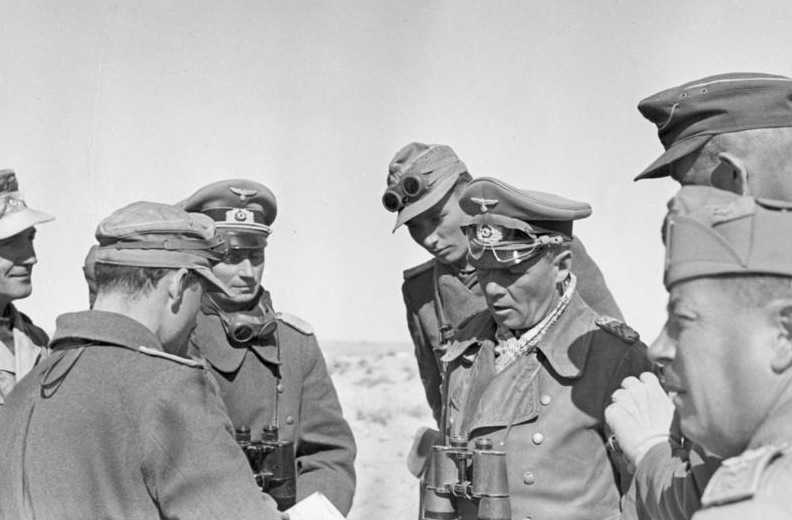
German General Erwin Rommel in conversation with one of the generals of the 17th Infantry Division "Pavia" in El Agheila. January 12, 1942.

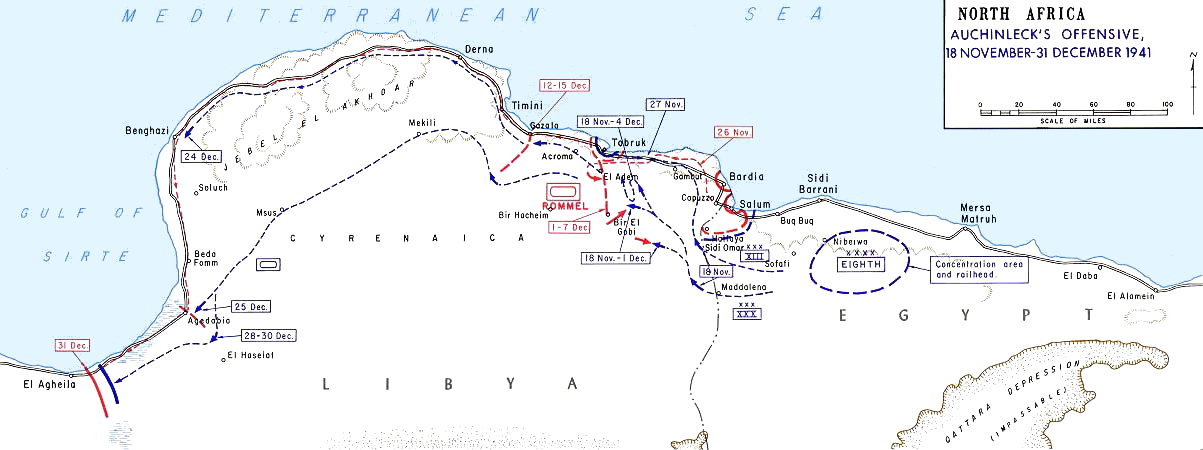
Operation Crusader 18 November 1941 - 31 December 1941 El Agheila is on the lower left (Click to enlarge)

In February 1941, El Agheila was taken by the British Western Desert Force following their destruction of the Italian Tenth Army in Operation Compass. The British halted there while most of the Western Desert Force was moved to deal with the Axis's invasion of Greece. This gave the German Afrika Korps under Erwin Rommel a chance to arrive and launch an offensive which retook El Agheila in March and drove the British all the way back to Tobruk and the Egyptian frontier. Rommel further fortified the city and used it as a base for his operations against Tobruk. After being driven back from Tobruk following Operation Crusader in December 1941, the Afrika Korps fell back to El Agheila, halting their retreat and the British advance there.

In January 1942, Rommel launched a new offensive at El Agheila, which again drove the British back towards Tobruk. This time he captured Tobruk and advanced into Egypt before being halted at El Alamein in July 1942 and decisively defeated there in November. The Afrika Korps was broken, and its retreating remnants gave up El Agheila for the final time to the advancing British Eighth Army in December 1942.

==== Libyan civil war ====
During the Libyan civil war, the town was taken by anti-Gaddafi forces in early March, retaken by forces loyal to Muammar Gaddafi in mid-March, and retaken again by NTC forces in late March only to be once again taken by government forces a couple of days later. It was retaken a third time by anti-Gaddafi forces in August.
