= Jikharra =

Jikhara إجخرة
- Town
- Location in Libya
- Coordinates: 29°17′N 21°38′E
- Country: Libya
- Region: Cyrenaica
- District: Al Wahat

Population (2006)
  - Total: 4,117
- Time zone: UTC+2 (EET)
- License Plate Code: 67

Jikharra (إجخرة Ijkharrah) is a desert oasis town formerly in the Al Wahat District, Cyrenaica region, in north-eastern Libya. Prior to 2007, it was in the Ajdabiya District. After 2015 it was in Jikharra District (بلدية إجخرة).

In 1929, during the Second Italo-Senussi War, a battle took place in the desert near the town at Al-Koz and Abu Athila, in which 241 Senussi fighters were killed.
