= Ajdabiya =

Ajdabiya أجدابيا
- Town
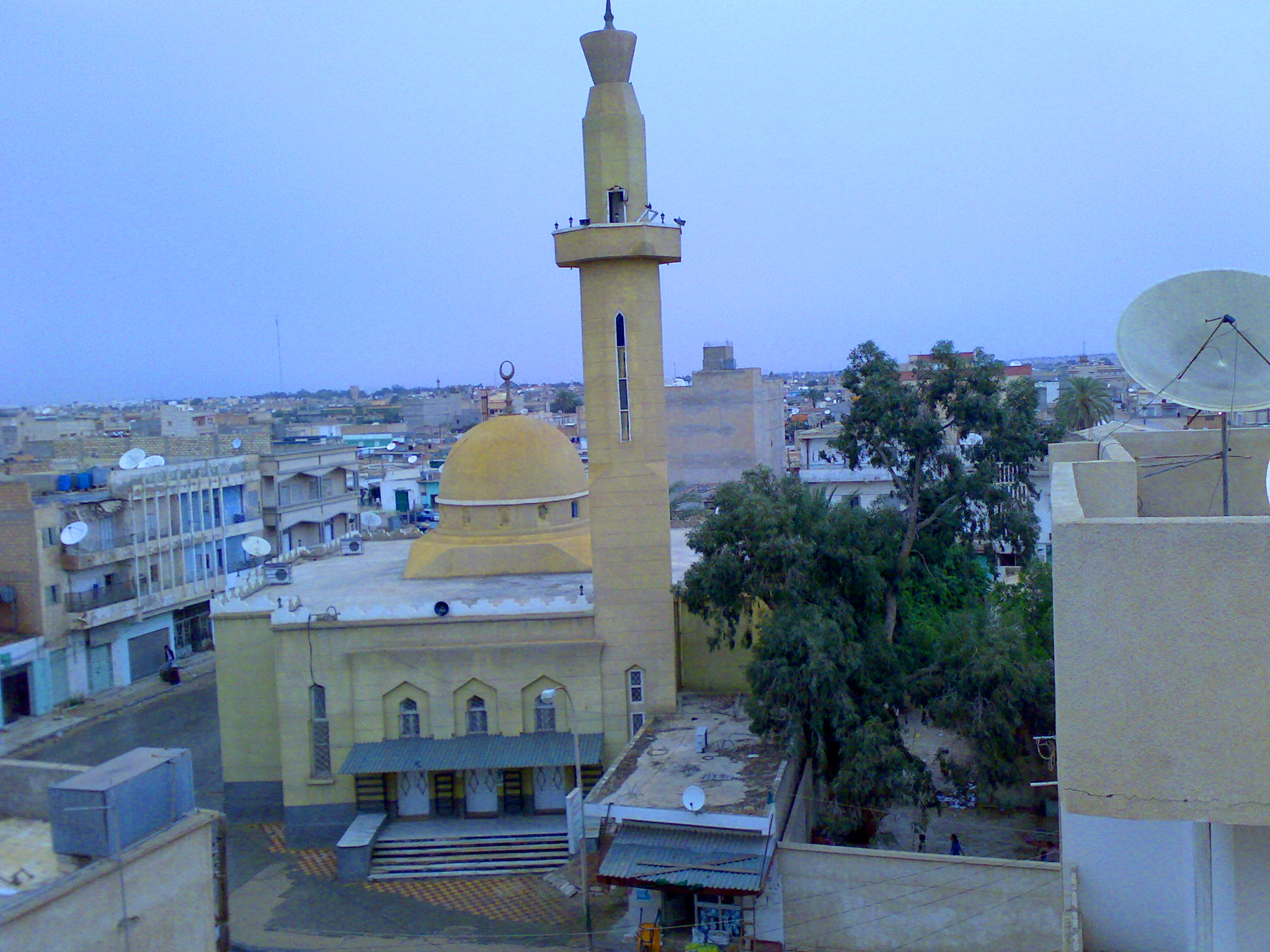
- Ajdabiya

- Location in Libya
- Coordinates: 30°45′20″N 20°13′31″E
- Country: Libya
- Region: Cyrenaica
- District: Al Wahat
- Elevation: 6.6 ft (2 m)

Population (2020)
  - Total: 416,000
- Time zone: UTC+2 (EET)
- License Plate Code: 12

Ajdabiya (/ˌɑːdʒdəˈbiːə/ AHJ-də-BEE-ə; Arabic: أجدابيا, romanized: Aǧdābiyā) is a town in and capital of the Al Wahat District in northeastern Libya. It is some 150 kilometres (93 mi) south of Benghazi. From 2001 to 2007 it was part of and capital of the Ajdabiya District. The town is divided into three Basic People's Congresses: North Ajdabiya, West Ajdabiya and East Ajdabiya.

During the Libyan Civil War, the city changed hands several times between rebels and pro-Gaddafi forces, with the anti-Gaddafi forces finally securing the town in April 2011. As many civilians had fled the fighting, one March 2011 report described the city as a "ghost town."

Later, during the Second Libyan Civil War, the city was seized by the Ajdabiya Revolutionaries Shura Council until it was taken over by the Libyan National Army on 21 February 2016.

== Geography ==
Ajdabiya is situated in central northern Libya near the Mediterranean Sea coast at the eastern end of the Gulf of Sidra. It is located on an arid plain about 6.4 kilometres (4.0 mi) from the sea, 850 kilometres (530 mi) from the Libyan capital of Tripoli and 150 kilometres (93 mi) from Libya's second largest city, Benghazi. The city is the site of an important crossroads between the coastal road from Tripoli to Benghazi and inland routes south to the oasis at Jalu and east to Tobruk and the border with Egypt. Ajdabiya lies close to the Sabkhat Ghuzayyil, a large dry region below sea level.

=== Climate ===
Ajdabiya has a hot desert climate (Köppen climate classification BWh). For a location very close to the Mediterranean Sea it is very prone to strong heat waves and has reached above 47 °C (117 °F) as early as in April in spite of the sea having mild surface temperatures that time of the year. This is due to hot winds from the Sahara Desert bringing extreme temperatures north. In summer Ajdabiya is similar to interior climates in Southern Europe, except drier. Winters are mild, with occasional rainfall.

Climate data for Ajdabiya
Month	Jan	Feb	Mar	Apr	May	Jun	Jul	Aug	Sep	Oct	Nov	Dec	Year
Record high °C (°F)	27.5 (81.5)	36.7 (98.1)	39.0 (102.2)	47.2 (117.0)	47.4 (117.3)	46.7 (116.1)	46.0 (114.8)	45.6 (114.1)	45.2 (113.4)	40.3 (104.5)	35.6 (96.1)	30.6 (87.1)	47.4 (117.3)
Mean daily maximum °C (°F)	17.6 (63.7)	19.3 (66.7)	22.0 (71.6)	26.2 (79.2)	30.3 (86.5)	33.3 (91.9)	32.1 (89.8)	32.8 (91.0)	32.0 (89.6)	29.0 (84.2)	24.0 (75.2)	19.2 (66.6)	26.5 (79.7)
Daily mean °C (°F)	12.5 (54.5)	13.7 (56.7)	16.0 (60.8)	19.7 (67.5)	23.3 (73.9)	26.1 (79.0)	25.8 (78.4)	26.3 (79.3)	25.3 (77.5)	22.5 (72.5)	18.1 (64.6)	14.1 (57.4)	20.3 (68.5)
Mean daily minimum °C (°F)	7.5 (45.5)	8.0 (46.4)	10.0 (50.0)	13.2 (55.8)	16.4 (61.5)	19.0 (66.2)	19.5 (67.1)	19.8 (67.6)	18.7 (65.7)	16.1 (61.0)	12.1 (53.8)	8.9 (48.0)	14.1 (57.4)
Record low °C (°F)	0.4 (32.7)	0.2 (32.4)	1.8 (35.2)	3.9 (39.0)	7.2 (45.0)	9.4 (48.9)	11.2 (52.2)	10.0 (50.0)	9.2 (48.6)	7.0 (44.6)	3.6 (38.5)	1.9 (35.4)	0.2 (32.4)
Average precipitation mm (inches)	40 (1.6)	23 (0.9)	6 (0.2)	1 (0.0)	2 (0.1)	0 (0)	0 (0)	0 (0)	0 (0)	8 (0.3)	22 (0.9)	27 (1.1)	129 (5.1)
Average precipitation days (≥ 0.1 mm)	9	4	4	2	1	0	0	0	1	2	4	8	35
Average relative humidity (%)	68	65	54	47	43	47	54	52	52	52	57	66	55
Mean monthly sunshine hours	206	216	250	267	312	344	377	360	301	273	230	191	3,327
Source: Deutscher Wetterdienst (sun 1961–1990) (Note: Station ID for Agedabia is 62055 Use this station ID to locate the sunshine duration)

== History ==
Ajdabiya has been identified as the site of the Roman city of Corniclanum, which is shown on the Peutinger Table of the Roman road network in the fourth or fifth centuries AD. It gained its importance for two reasons: it possessed drinkable water, which made it a useful staging post in an arid region, and it stood on the intersection of two important trade routes, the coastal route along the North African littoral and the desert caravan route from the oases of Jalu and al-Ujlah. The town passed to the Byzantine Empire following the fall of Rome but gained new importance under the rule of the Fatimid Caliphate. After sacking the town in 912, the Fatimids redeveloped Ajdabiya and built a new mosque and palace complex, the ruins of which can still be seen. Around 1051–52 it was sacked again, this time by the Beni Hilal and Banu Sulaym, Arab tribes that migrated to North Africa at the instigation of the Fatimids. It subsequently fell into a prolonged period of decline.

In the mid 12th century, the Arab geographer Muhammad al-Idrisi described Ajdabiya as "a town situated on a flat, stony plateau". He wrote in his treatise Nuzhat al-Mushtaq (published in Europe as De geographia universali):

In olden times [Ajdabiya] was surrounded by walls, but now only two forts remain standing in the desert. Ajdabiya is four miles distant from the sea. There is no vegetation in the town nor around it. The majority of its inhabitants are Jewish and Muslim merchants. Around the town tribes of the Berber wander about in great numbers. There is no running water either in Ajdabiya or in Barqa, and the people get their water from cisterns and water-pits (sawani), [which they use] to grow a small amount of wheat, but mainly barley and various kinds of pulses and cereals.

IIn Al-Istibsar fi 'agaib al-Amsar, written in the late 12th century, the anonymous author wrote:

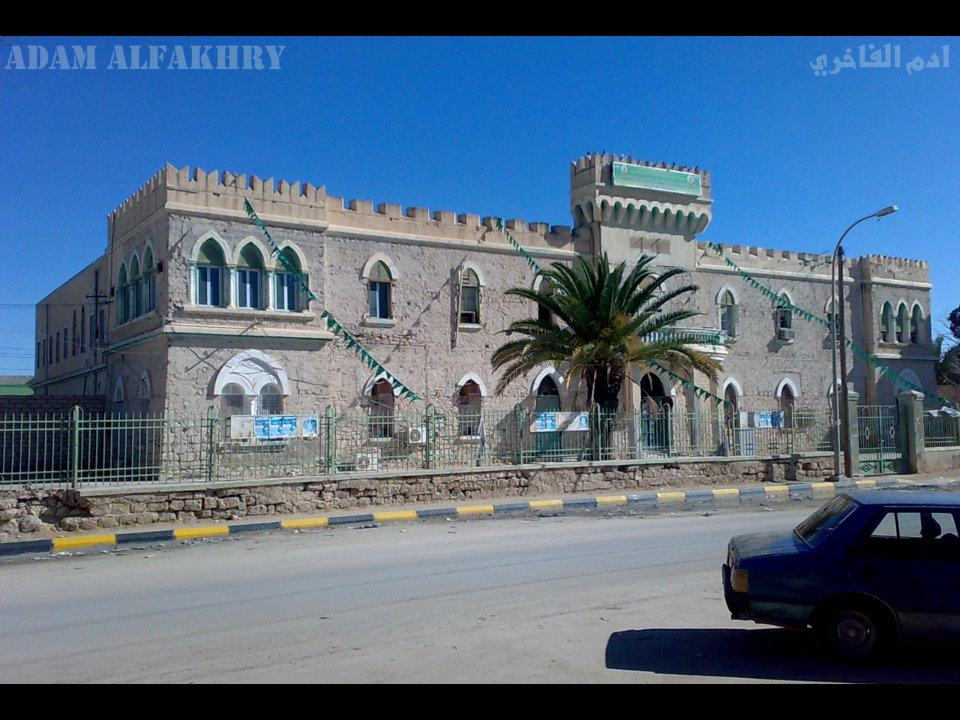
Ajdabiya museum

"A large city in a desert of solid rock, with wells carved into this rock. The air and water there are pleasant, and it has a gushing spring of fresh water. There are a few orchards and palm trees. The city has a beautifully built mosque, built by "The Shiite", with an octagonal minaret of remarkable craftsmanship. [..] The buildings do not have wooden roofs but are instead domed structures made of bricks due to the strong winds in the area. Beyond the city, Berber and Arab tribes extend toward Mount Nafousa, which stretches from east to west for six days' travel. It lies six days' journey from Kairouan and contains many cities. In this mountain, there are numerous ancient ruins, with astonishing and remarkable sights for those who observe them."

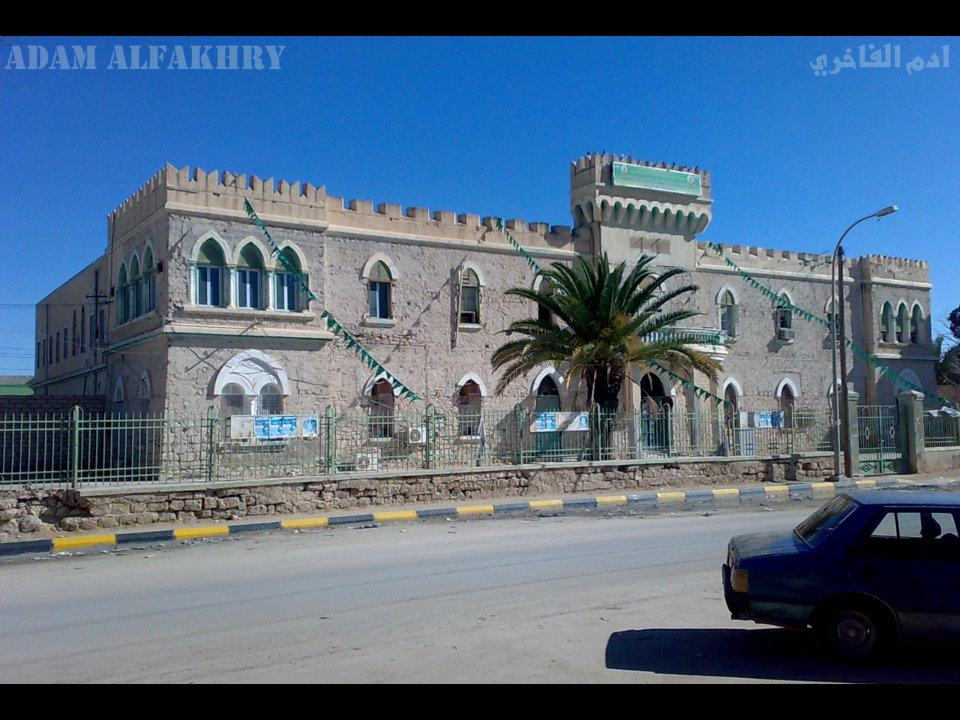
Ajdabiya museum

=== Ottomans and the 20th century ===
The town was later revived by the Ottomans to serve as a minor administrative centre for western Cyrenaica. It became an important centre for the Senussi movement in the early 20th century and became the capital of an autonomous Senussi-ruled region between 1920 and 1923 under the terms of an accord with Italy, which had occupied Libya from 1911. In April 1923, however, the accord broke down and the Italians seized Ajdabiya, turning it into an important military outpost. The area was the scene of heavy fighting during the Second World War; during Operation Compass, British forces forced Italian troops to retreat through Ajdabiya (February 1941, Battle of Beda Fomm), but soon later they lost control of it again on April 2, 1941, when Rommel's Afrikakorps counter-attacked. The town finally reverted to Allied control on November 23, 1942, when it was recaptured by the British 7th Armoured Division.

Ajdabiya's fortunes were transformed after the war by the development of the Libyan oil industry at nearby Brega. By 1979 it had become a boom town with a population of about 32,000 people. The bulk of the male population worked in the oil industry, government service or other local service industries. The town acquired a new area of public housing, police stations, educational facilities and a general hospital run by Libya's ally Bulgaria. In other respects, however, it remained comparatively undeveloped – many of the roads were left as dirt tracks without drainage, resulting in them being muddy and flooded in the winter and dirty and dusty in the summer. Libya's predominately tribal society also resulted in an unusual style of urbanisation; nomadic members of the Zuwaya tribe settled on the outskirts of the town and established tent camps, which they gradually replaced with houses. The layout of some areas of the town thus resembles that of nomadic camps, with a senior man in the centre of an area, his married sons nearby, with their younger brothers and their own sons clustered around them.

=== Libyan civil war ===
Ajdabiya was the site of anti-government protests on February 16–17, 2011 in which up to ten people were said to have been killed, some by pro-government snipers. Protesters quickly took control of the city and declared it to be a "Free City" after burning down the local government headquarters. The city subsequently came under attack from the Libyan air force and on March 15, 2011, the Libyan army encircled Ajdabiya in preparation for an assault to retake it. The battle for Ajdabiya was cited as a potential turning point in the conflict on which the fate of the whole rebellion against the Gaddafi government could be decided. After two days of heavy fighting, pro-Gaddafi forces seized the strategic crossroads, gained control of most of the city and pressed on to the rebel-held stronghold of Benghazi.

The city was retaken by rebel forces on March 26, 2011, after air strikes authorised by the United Nations destroyed much of the Libyan army's heavy weaponry in and around Ajdabiya and forced them to retreat to the west. Much of the population fled the fighting in the city, which was reported to have suffered heavy damage.

On April 8, loyalist forces attempted to recapture the city. Taking advantage of a disorganised rebel retreat following the Third Battle of Brega, loyalist troops entered the city and had taken control of most of it by April 9. However, rebel forces soon regrouped and had pushed pro-Gaddafi forces out of the city by April 11, with heavy support from NATO airstrikes. The front line then stagnated outside of the city, 40 km down the road to Brega. Loyalist shells continued to intermittently strike the western gate and outskirts of the city for several days. In April 2011, the citizens of Ajdabiya decided to rename the city's principal square as "Tim Hetherington Square", in honour of the British photojournalist killed in Misrata.

== Transport ==
- A station on the proposed Libyan railway network may be located here. The interstate line through Tobruk may diverge here from the coastal line to Benghazi to avoid difficult coast terrain and to save distance.
- Ajdabiya is on the crossroads of many important roads in Libya:
  - Libyan Coastal Highway
  - Ajdabiya–Kufra Road
  - Tobruk–Ajdabiya Road

== See also ==
- List of cities in Libya
- Railway stations in Libya
