= Jalu =

Jalu جالو
- Oasis town
- Location of Jalu in Libya
- Coordinates: 29.0284°N 21.5366°E
- Country: Libya
- Municipality: Al Wahat District
- Region: Cyrenaica

Population (2010)
  - Total: 7,963
- Time zone: UTC+2

Jalu (Arabic: جالو) is an oasis town in eastern Libya, located in the Al Wahat District within the historical region of Cyrenaica. It is one of the main oasis settlements in the Libyan Desert and has historically served as an important stop for trans-Saharan trade routes linking North Africa with Central Africa.

Jalu is known for its fertile oasis environment and extensive palm groves, making it one of the notable date-producing areas in Libya. The town also hosts the annual Jalu International Dates Festival.

== Etymology ==
The origin of the name "Jalu" is uncertain, and no widely accepted linguistic explanation exists.

== History ==
=== Early history ===
Jalu has long been recognized as one of the oasis settlements that supported caravan routes across the Sahara Desert.

=== Modern period ===
During the 19th and early 20th centuries, Jalu gained importance as a hub for organizing trade caravans connecting Cyrenaica and Tripoli with regions such as Chad, Sudan, and Egypt.

=== Italian occupation and resistance ===
During the Italian occupation of Libya, Jalu supported the Libyan resistance led by Omar Mukhtar.

== Geography ==
Jalu lies in the Libyan Desert in southeastern Libya and is characterized by sand dunes and fertile oasis land sustained by underground water sources.

== Districts ==
Jalu is divided locally into four main districts:

- El Labbah
- Al-Araq (also known as "Al-Bilad")
- Al-Sharaf
- Rashidah

== Economy ==
The economy of Jalu is based on agriculture, especially date production, as well as local trade and services.

== Sports ==
Football is the most popular sport in Jalu.

Notable clubs include:

- Al-Labbah SC – founded in 1985, Libyan First Division
- Al-Fath Jalu FC – Libyan First Division
- Al-Taweya SC – Libyan First Division
- Al-Tadamon SC – Libyan Second Division

== Landmarks ==
- Ottoman Qishla – Ottoman-era fortress
- Italian Palace – Italian colonial building

== Events ==
- Jalu International Dates Festival – annual agricultural event

== Climate ==
Jalu has a hot desert climate (BWh), characterized by extremely hot summers and very low annual rainfall.

Climate data for Jalo (1991–2020)
Month	Jan	Feb	Mar	Apr	May	Jun	Jul	Aug	Sep	Oct	Nov	Dec	Year
Record high °C (°F)	35.0 (95.0)	38.6 (101.5)	41.0 (105.8)	44.0 (111.2)	48.4 (119.1)	48.0 (118.4)	47.0 (116.6)	48.0 (118.4)	45.5 (113.9)	43.5 (110.3)	39.0 (102.2)	33.3 (91.9)	48.4 (119.1)
Mean daily maximum °C (°F)	19.9 (67.8)	21.6 (70.9)	25.7 (78.3)	30.5 (86.9)	34.4 (93.9)	37.6 (99.7)	37.7 (99.9)	37.7 (99.9)	36.3 (97.3)	31.7 (89.1)	25.6 (78.1)	21.2 (70.2)	30.0 (86.0)
Daily mean °C (°F)	13.7 (56.7)	15.1 (59.2)	18.7 (65.7)	23.1 (73.6)	27.2 (81.0)	30.4 (86.7)	30.9 (87.6)	31.1 (88.0)	29.6 (85.3)	25.1 (77.2)	19.1 (66.4)	15.0 (59.0)	23.3 (73.9)
Mean daily minimum °C (°F)	7.5 (45.5)	8.6 (47.5)	11.5 (52.7)	15.7 (60.3)	19.5 (67.1)	23.2 (73.8)	24.0 (75.2)	24.5 (76.1)	22.8 (73.0)	18.5 (65.3)	12.6 (54.7)	8.8 (47.8)	16.4 (61.5)
Record low °C (°F)	1.0 (33.8)	2.0 (35.6)	3.5 (38.3)	4.8 (40.6)	11.5 (52.7)	16.5 (61.7)	17.5 (63.5)	19.7 (67.5)	15.5 (59.9)	9.5 (49.1)	4.0 (39.2)	1.2 (34.2)	1.0 (33.8)
Average precipitation mm (inches)	1.8 (0.07)	2.8 (0.11)	1.0 (0.04)	1.0 (0.04)	0.4 (0.02)	0.0 (0.0)	0.0 (0.0)	0.0 (0.0)	0.0 (0.0)	0.6 (0.02)	0.0 (0.0)	1.6 (0.06)	9.2 (0.36)
Source: NOAA

== Notable people ==
- Abu-Bakr Yunis Jabr (1952–2011)

== Gallery ==
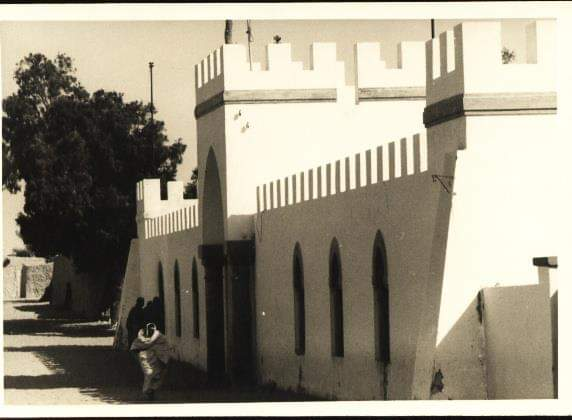
Governor's Palace

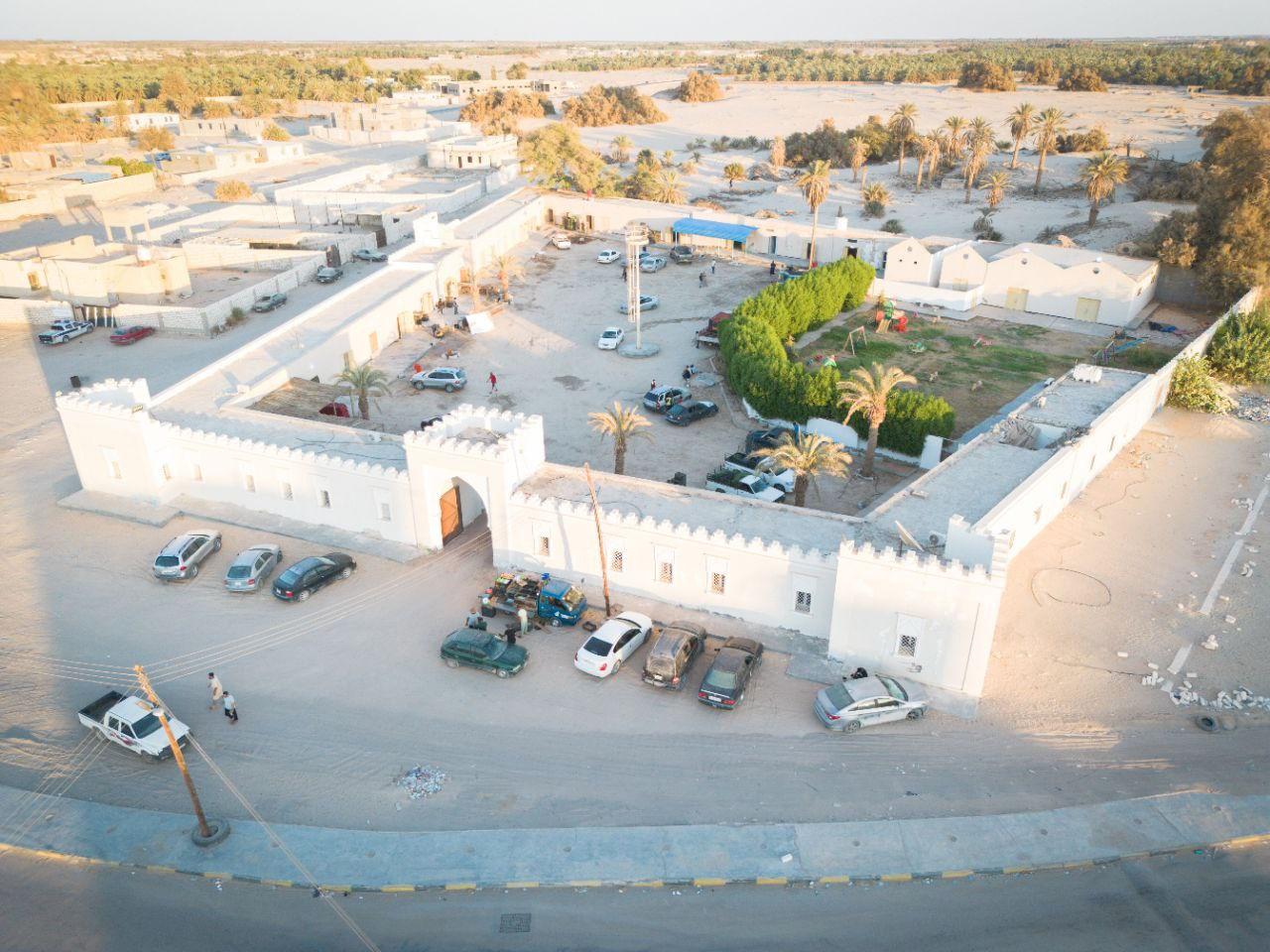
Jalu Archaeological Castle

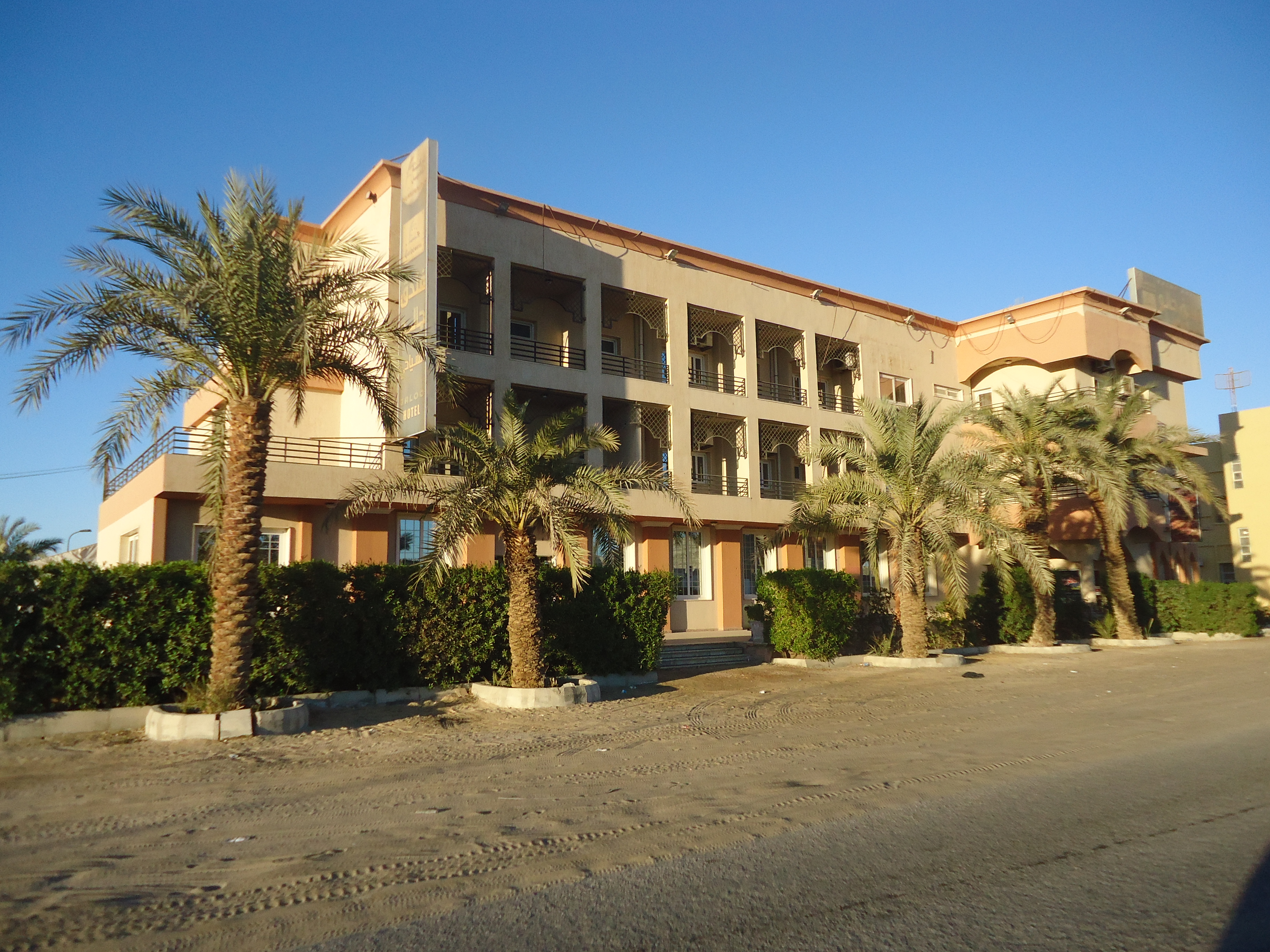
Jalu Tourist Hotel

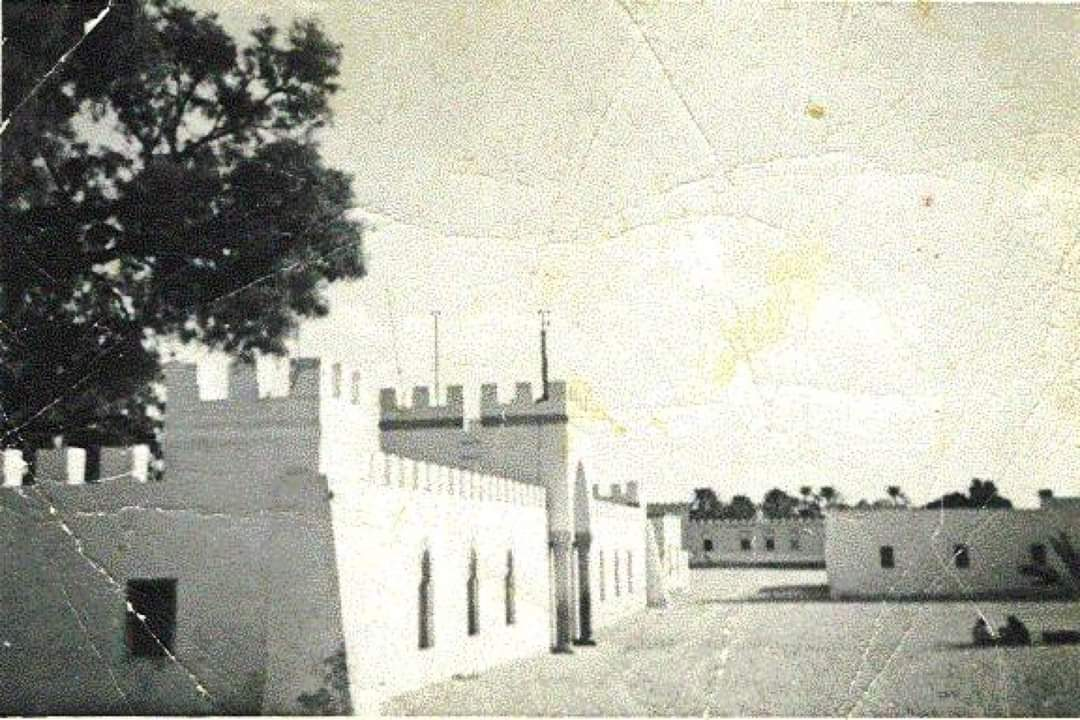

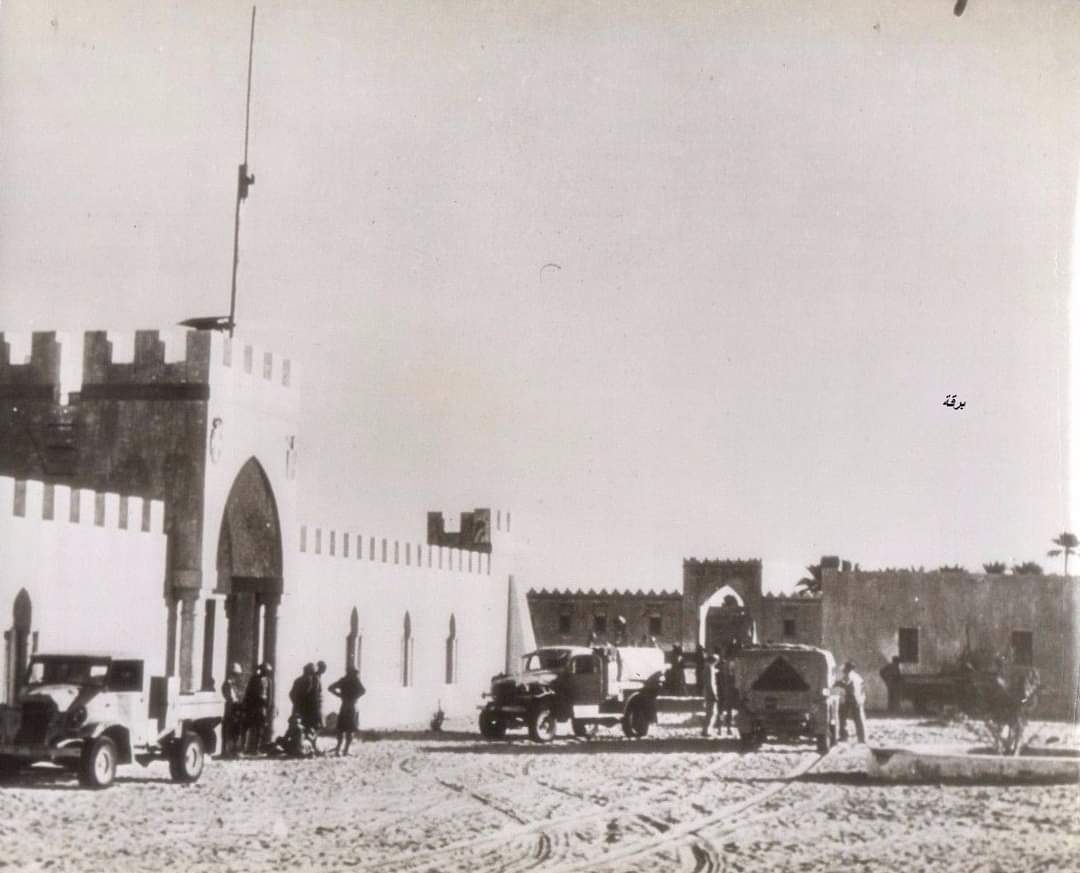

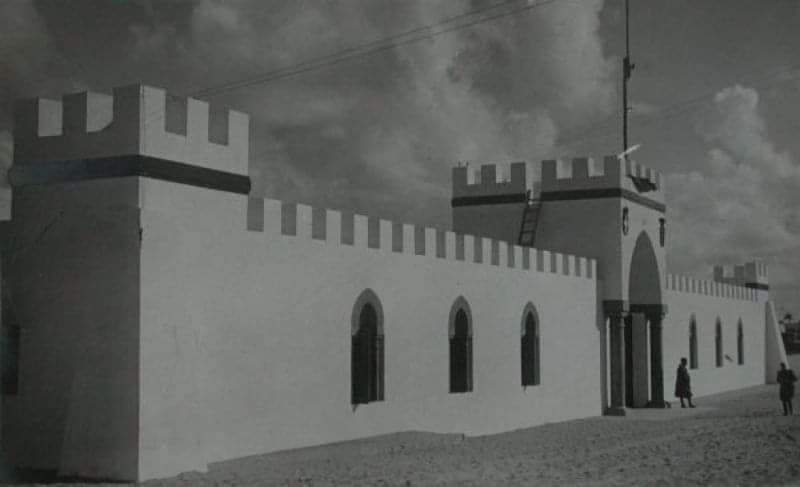

== See also ==
- List of cities in Libya
