= Al Wahat District =

District of Libya

Coordinates: 30°N 22°E

Al Wahat الواحات
- District
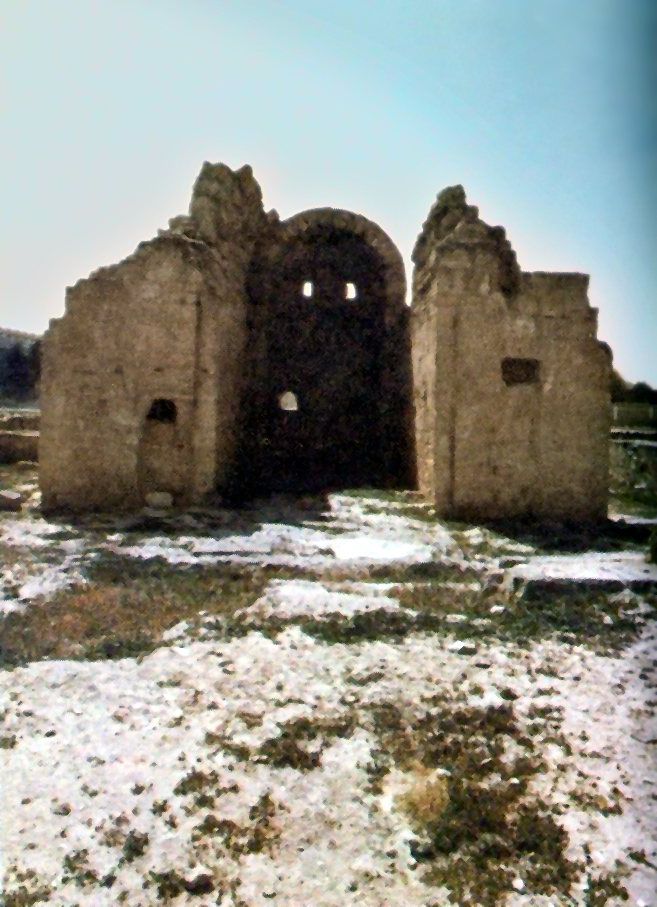
- Fatimid castle

- Map of Libya with Al Wahat district highlighted
- Country: Libya
- Capital: Ajdabiya

Population (2006)
  - Total: 164,718
- License Plate Code: 12, 16, 67

Al Wahat or The Oases (Arabic: الواحات Al Wāḥāt, English: The Oases), occasionally spelt Al Wahad or Al Wahah (English: The Oasis) is one of the districts of Libya. Its capital and largest city is Ajdabiya. The district is home to much of Libya's petroleum extraction economic activity.

== History ==
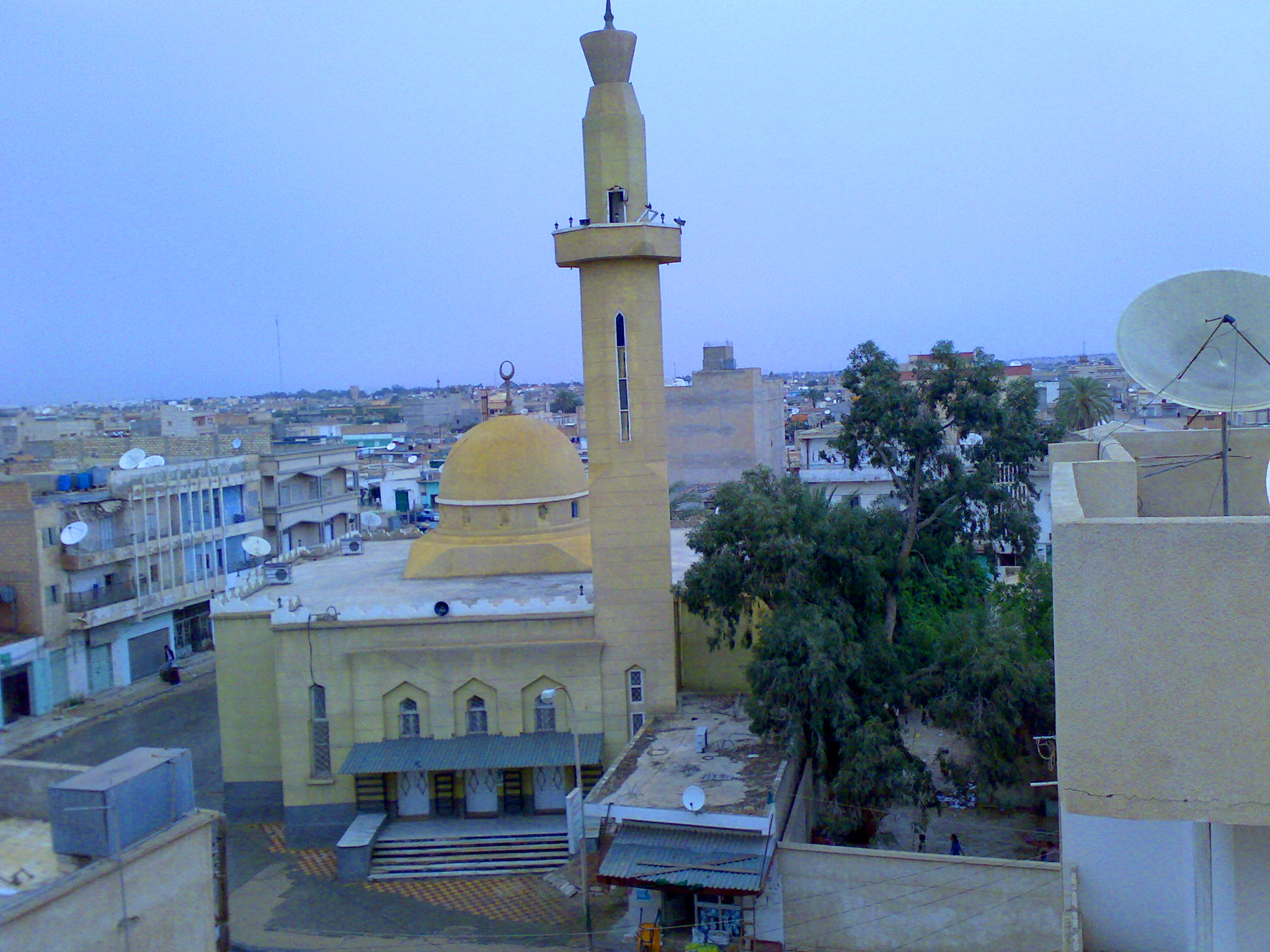
Ajdabiya museum

Traditionally, Al Wahat was the western part of Cyrenaica. With the division of Libya into ten governorates in 1963, Al Wahat became part of the Misrata Governorate. In the 1973 reorganization, it became part of Al Khalji Governorate. In 1983, Al Khalji was divided into a number of baladiyat (districts), with what is now Al Wahat being included in the Ajdabiya baladiyah and the Jalu baladiyah. In the 1988 reorganization, Jalu was subsumed within Ajdabiya baladiyah. The status of the area in the reorganization of 1995 which created thirteen districts is unclear; however, in the 1998 reorganization into twenty-six districts, the name "Al-Wahad" appears as a district for the first time. In 2001 the area was divided between Al Wahat and Ajdabiya districts. In 2007, the former Al Wahat district (area:108,670 km^{2}) was enlarged to include what had been the Ajdabiya District and part of Kufra District. It now has essentially the boundaries that the baladiyah (district) of Ajdabiya did from 1988 to 1995.

== Geography ==
Al Wahat has a short border with Egypt, and borders the following Libyan districts, namely, Butnan in east and northeast, Kufra in south, Jufra in southwest, Sirte in west, Benghazi in north, Marj in north, Jabal al Akhdar and Derna in the north.

The district is located in Cyrenacia which is mostly semi arid in nature. The region receives an annual rainfall of 5 in (130 mm). There are no perennial rivers in the region, but the region is abundant with groundwater aquifers. The largest water course in Libya, Wadi Al Hamim, runs through northern Al Wahat and is thought to be the course of the ancestral Nile.

== Demographics ==
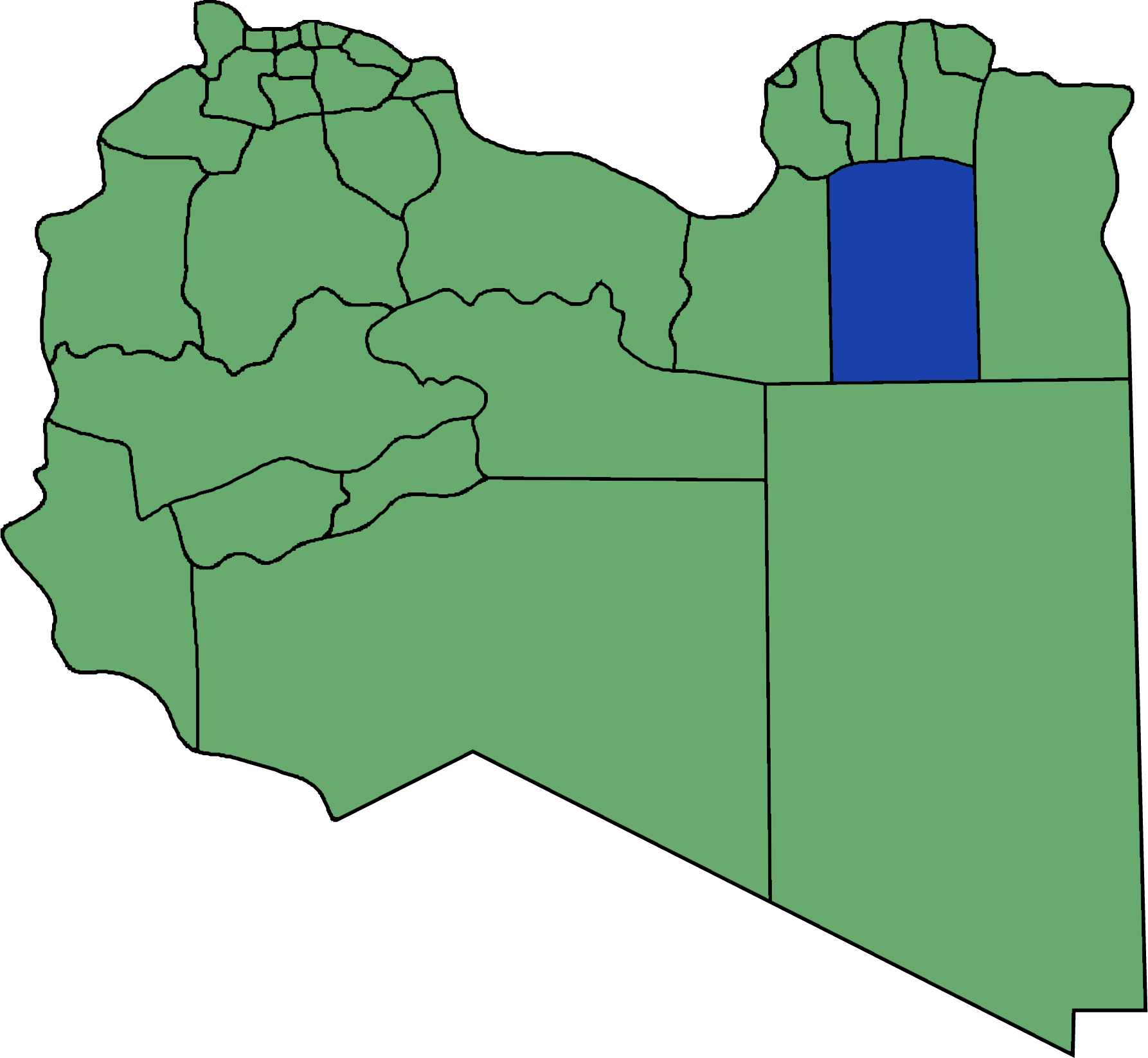
Al Wahat District from 2001 to 2007

Per 2006 census, there were totally 54,593 economically active people in the district. There were 20,225 government employees, 6,585 employers, 23,074 first level workers and 024 second level workers. There were 9,586 workers in state administration, 7,212 in agriculture, animal husbandry and forestry, 7,621 in agriculture & hunting, 8,715 in education, 8,517 in private enterprises, 1,820 in health & social work, 4,340 in production, 9,931 in technical work and 492 service workers. The total enrollment in schools was 61,849 and the number of people above secondary stage and less than graduation was 3,882. As per the report from World Health Organization (WHO), there were 2 communicable disease centres, 4 dental clinics, 2 general clinics, 0 in-patient clinics, 10 out-patient clinics, 27 pharmacies, 47 PHC centres, 1 polyclinics, 1 rural clinics and 0 specialized clinics.

== Administrative subdivisions ==
As of the 2007 reorganization, Al Wahat District was subdivided into seventeen Basic People's Congresses, namely, Zueitina, East Ajdabiya, West Ajdabiya, North Ajdabiya, Brega, Bashir, Sultan, al`Arqub, El Agheila, Albydan, Antalat, Marsa Brega, Alguenan, Awjila, Jalu, Jikharra and Maradah. The following major towns are located within Al Wahat District, as of 2007: Ajdabiya, Awjila, Labba, El Agheila, Jalu, Jikharra and Sultan.

== See also ==
- Calansho Desert
