= List of orders of battle for the 4th Armoured Brigade during the Second World War =

This is an order of battle of the British 4th Armoured Brigade during the Second World War. Many units either served with or were briefly attached to the brigade. The order of battle is given for a number of battles the brigade fought in and reflect the changes to the composition of Armoured Brigades as dictated by the War Office, not all of which were, or could be, applied to units in the field.

== Order of battle ==
=== Egypt September 1939 ===
Titled Heavy Armoured Brigade (Egypt) an Infantry Tank brigade, part of the Armoured Division (Egypt).

- 1st Royal Tank Regiment
- 6th Royal Tank Regiment

=== Sidi Barrani December 1940 ===
Equipped with Cruiser tanks, part of 7th Armoured Division.

- 7th Hussars
- 2nd Royal Tank Regiment

=== Tobruk December 1941 ===
With 7th Armoured Division.

- 8th Hussars
- 3rd Royal Tank Regiment
- 5th Royal Tank Regiment

=== Defence of Alamein 20 July 1942 ===
Organised as an Armoured Brigade Group part of 7th Armoured Division.

- 4th/8th Hussars (Note: 4th/8th Hussars was a temporary unit formed in July 1942 by the amalgamation of the 4th and 8th Hussars due to losses in action. The regiments resumed their individual identities in November 1942.)
- 11th Hussars
- 12th Lancers
- 9th Battalion, Rifle Brigade (Tower Hamlets Rifles)
- 3rd Regiment, Royal Horse Artillery
- Troop from 113th Light Anti-Aircraft Battery Royal Artillery (RA)
- Troop from 3rd Field Squadron Royal Engineers (RE)
- 5th and 56th Companies Royal Army Service Corps (RASC)
- 14th Light Field Ambulance Royal Army Medical Corps (RAMC)

=== Alamein October–November 1942 ===
A brigade group attached to 7th Armoured Division, then X Corps.

- 4th/8th Hussars
- 11th Hussars
- Royal Scots Greys
- 2nd Derbyshire Yeomanry
- 1st Battalion, King's Royal Rifle Corps
- 3rd Regiment, Royal Horse Artillery
- Troop from 42nd Light Anti-Aircraft Battery RA
- Troop from 21st Field Squadron RE
- 5th and 56th Companies RASC
- 14th Light Field Ambulance RAMC

=== Mareth Line 16–23 March 1943 ===
A brigade group attached to X Corps.

- 1st The Royal Dragoons
- 1st King's Dragoon Guards
- 2nd Battalion, King's Royal Rifle Corps
- 3rd Regiment, Royal Horse Artillery
- Troop from 42nd Light Anti-Aircraft Battery
- Troop from 4th Field Squadron RE
- 5th and 56th Companies RASC
- 14th Light Field Ambulance RAMC

=== Caen 4–8 July 1944 ===
A brigade group attached to VIII Corps.

- Royal Scots Greys
- 3rd/4th County of London Yeomanry (Sharpshooters)
- 44th Royal Tank Regiment
- 2nd Battalion, King's Royal Rifle Corps

=== The Rhineland 8 February to 1 April 1945 ===
Organised as a brigade group attached at various times to VIII Corps, 11th Armoured Division and XII Corps.

- Royal Scots Greys
- 3rd/4th County of London Yeomanry (Sharpshooters)
- 44th Royal Tank Regiment (Note: Between 9–24 March this unit was equipped with specialist armour and trained by 79th Armoured Division in its use. The unit reverted to a normal armoured regiment.)
- 2nd Battalion, King's Royal Rifle Corps

Other units also served with the brigade

- 50th Royal Tank Regiment
- 1st East Riding Yeomanry
- 1st Regiment, Royal Horse Artillery
- 104th (Essex Yeomanry) Regiment, Royal Horse Artillery
- 78th Field Regiment, RA

== See also ==
- British armoured formations of the Second World War

== Bibliography ==
- Bellis, Malcolm A. (1994). Regiments of the British Army 1939–1945 (Armour & Infantry). London: Military Press International. ISBN 0-85420-999-9.
- Joslen, Lt-Col H.F. (1990) [1st. Pub. HMSO:1960]. Orders of Battle, Second World War, 1939–1945. London: London Stamp Exchange. ISBN 0-948130-03-2.
- Westlake, Ray (1986). The Territorial Battalions, A Pictorial History, 1859–1985. Tunbridge Wells: Spellmount.
