= 2nd Armoured Division (United Kingdom) =

1939-1941 combat formation of the British Army

- The divisional sign was a plumed helmet of a knight. It was painted on the division's vehicles and tanks, but probably not worn on uniforms.
- Active: 1939–1941
- Branch: British Army
- Type: Armour
- Size: Second World War; 10,750 men War Establishment: 342 tanks (Note: These two figures are the war establishment, the paper strength, of an armoured division for 1940.); Actual: 102 tanks (Libya)
- Engagements: Operation Sonnenblume

Commanders
- Notable commanders: Major-General Michael Gambier-Parry

The 2nd Armoured Division was a division of the British Army that was active during the early stages of the Second World War. The division's creation had been discussed since the beginning of 1939, with the intent to form it by splitting the 1st Armoured Division. A lack of tanks delayed this until December 1939. For a short period after its creation, the division had no assigned units until the 1st Light Armoured Brigade was assigned to it from the 1st Armoured Division, and the 22nd Heavy Armoured Brigade from Southern Command.

In early 1940, 1st Armoured Division was given priority for equipment, leaving the 2nd Armoured Division understrength and equipped largely with light tanks. After the Battle of France, with the threat of a German invasion of the United Kingdom, priority for equipment shifted to the 2nd Armoured Division, which was brought up to strength. The plan was to use the division to counter-attack the flanks of a feared German invasion force. In August 1940, an armoured regiment from the division was transported to Egypt and transferred to the 7th Armoured Division, but it was replaced by another. In October, it was decided to transfer the rest of the division to Egypt, as reinforcements for Middle East Command.

Before leaving for Egypt, the division exchanged brigades with the 1st Armoured Division. Since the brigade received in exchange consisted of only one armoured regiment, division strength was reduced to three armoured regiments. Upon arriving in Egypt in December 1940, the division was further reduced in order to provide support for Operation Lustre, an expeditionary force to Greece. The detached units included two-thirds of the division's tanks, a battalion of infantry, and artillery support. The remnants of the division then moved to the province of Cyrenaica in Italian Libya, which had been conquered during Operation Compass. The division's remaining tanks were worn-out; they were supplemented by captured Italian models that were equally decrepit. In March, a German-Italian counter-attack led to the destruction of the division, and the ejection of the British from Cyrenaica, except for Tobruk. The consensus of historians is that there was little the division could have done to prevent this, given the circumstances of its being under equipped, poorly supplied, lacking proper training, and having inadequate communications and an unclear chain of command.

== Background ==
During the interwar period, the British Army examined the lessons learnt from the First World War; and a need was seen for experimentation with and development of theories of manoeuvre and armoured warfare, as well as the creation of the short-lived Experimental Mechanized Force. The long-term impact was for the army to start to move towards mechanisation, to enhance battlefield mobility. By the 1930s, the army had established three types of divisions: the infantry division, the mobile division (later called an armoured division), and the motor division (a motorised infantry division). The primary role of the infantry division was to penetrate the enemy's defensive line, with the support of infantry tanks. Any gap created would then be exploited by mobile divisions, and the territory thus captured would be secured by the fast-moving motor divisions. These tactics would transform the attack into a break-through, while maintaining mobility.

The Mobile Division was created in October 1937; it included six light tank regiments, three medium tank regiments, two motorized infantry battalions, and two artillery regiments. The light-tank units were intended for reconnaissance only. General John Burnett-Stuart, who was responsible for training the Mobile Division, stated that the infantry were not "to be put on to a position by tanks and told to hold it, and they are not meant to fight side by side with your tanks in the forefront"; the infantry's role was simply to protect the tanks when they were stationary. Burnett-Stuart's tactics did not conform with British doctrine, which promoted combined-arms co-operation to win battles, as did German armoured warfare doctrine, which held that tanks by themselves would not be a decisive weapon. However, Burnett-Stuart's thinking predominated within the British armoured forces until the doctrine was reformed in 1942.

In the 1930s, tensions increased between Germany and the United Kingdom. During 1937 and 1938, German demands for the annexation of the Sudetenland in Czechoslovakia led to an international crisis. This was resolved in September 1938 by the Munich Agreement, which allowed for German annexation. Tensions did not subside, and the British government debated how best to prepare the army for war. In January 1939, the Secretary of State for War Leslie Hore-Belisha proposed splitting the Mobile Division into two smaller formations but found no support for this move. The issue was broached again a month later, and was accepted in principle by the cabinet. Shortly after, the French were informed of a preliminary timetable for the arrival of the British Expeditionary Force (BEF) in the event of war: "One Regular Armoured Division will become available about the middle of 1940, the second would not be available 'till a later date'". The formation of a second division during this period was complicated by the slow pace of British tank production.

== Formation and home service ==
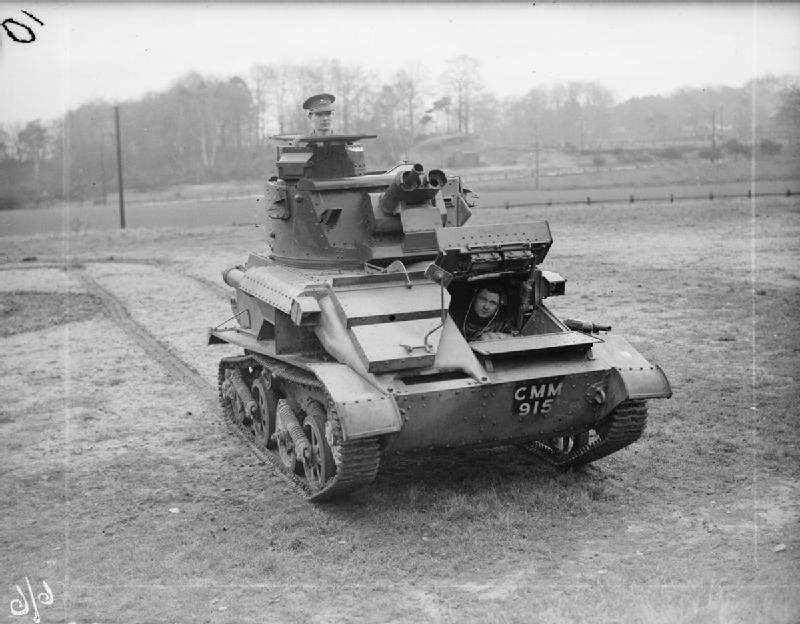
A Light Tank Mk VI of the 3rd Hussars

The 2nd Armoured Division was activated on 15 December 1939, with Major-General Frederick Hotblack as the first general officer commanding (GOC). Hotblack had joined the Royal Tank Corps in 1916, and by 1918 he had become the army's expert on German tanks. During the 1930s, he had been posted to Germany, where he witnessed and reported on the development of German armoured forces. Following the outbreak of the Second World War, in September 1939, he was the BEF's senior advisor on armoured vehicles.

The division had no assigned fighting sub-units until the following month, when the 1st Light Armoured Brigade was transferred from the 1st Armoured Division (previously the Mobile Division), and the 22nd Heavy Armoured Brigade was transferred from Southern Command. On assignment to the division, the 1st Light Armoured Brigade comprised three armoured regiments: the 1st King's Dragoon Guards (KDG), the 3rd The King's Own Hussars (3H), and the 4th Queen's Own Hussars (4H). The 22nd Heavy Brigade consisted of the Royal Gloucestershire Hussars, and the 3rd and the 4th County of London Yeomanry (Sharpshooters).

The 2nd Support Group, which would comprise the division's supporting arms, was formed in February. It did not have sub-units allocated until March; it was then composed of the 3rd Field Squadron, Royal Engineers; the 12th Regiment, Royal Horse Artillery (12 RHA); the 102nd (Northumberland Hussars) Light-Anti-aircraft/Anti-tank Regiment; and two motorised infantry units – the 1st Battalion, The Rangers, King's Royal Rifle Corps, and the 1st Battalion, Tower Hamlets Rifles, Rifle Brigade (The Prince Consort's Own).

The war establishment – the nominal full wartime strength – for a light armoured brigade was 108 light tanks and 66 cruiser tanks. A heavy armoured brigade's war establishment was 157 cruiser tanks. British doctrine defined light tanks as reconnaissance vehicles armed only with machine guns. Cruiser tanks were swift moving, more heavily armoured, and equipped with both a machine gun and an anti-tank gun. The primary role of the cruiser tank was to engage and destroy opposing armoured forces. Its main weapon, a 2-pounder anti-tank gun, was only supplied with armour-piercing rounds. This meant that cruiser tanks were ineffective against entrenched infantry, or in suppressing hostile artillery. Despite its war establishment, the division comprised a total of only 77 Vickers light tanks in January 1940.

In early 1940, to bring it up to full strength, the 1st Armoured Division was given priority for equipment, ready to go to France. The 2nd Armoured Division strength only increased slowly and it was not immediately issued with cruiser tanks. On 14 April, the 1st Light Armoured Brigade became the 1st Armoured Brigade, and the 22nd Heavy Armoured Brigade was renamed the 22nd Armoured Brigade. The renaming followed a change in the war establishment of an armoured regiment. The armament of regiments and brigades was to be homogeneous, with each brigade having 166 cruiser tanks. In total, including tanks assigned to headquarters units, an armoured division now had an establishment of 340 tanks, sixteen 25-pounder field gun-howitzers, and twenty-four 2-pounder anti-tank guns. By May, the division had 31 light tanks in the 1st Armoured Brigade. The 22nd Armoured Brigade had no serviceable tanks and made do with lorries. The division had two 25-pounders, supplemented by four First World War–vintage 18-pounder field guns, four QF 4.5 in (110 mm) howitzers of similar vintage and two anti-tank guns. On 10 May, Major-General Justice Tilly took command after Hotblack was removed following an apparent stroke. Tilly had been an armoured warfare instructor and commander of the 1st Tank Brigade before the war.

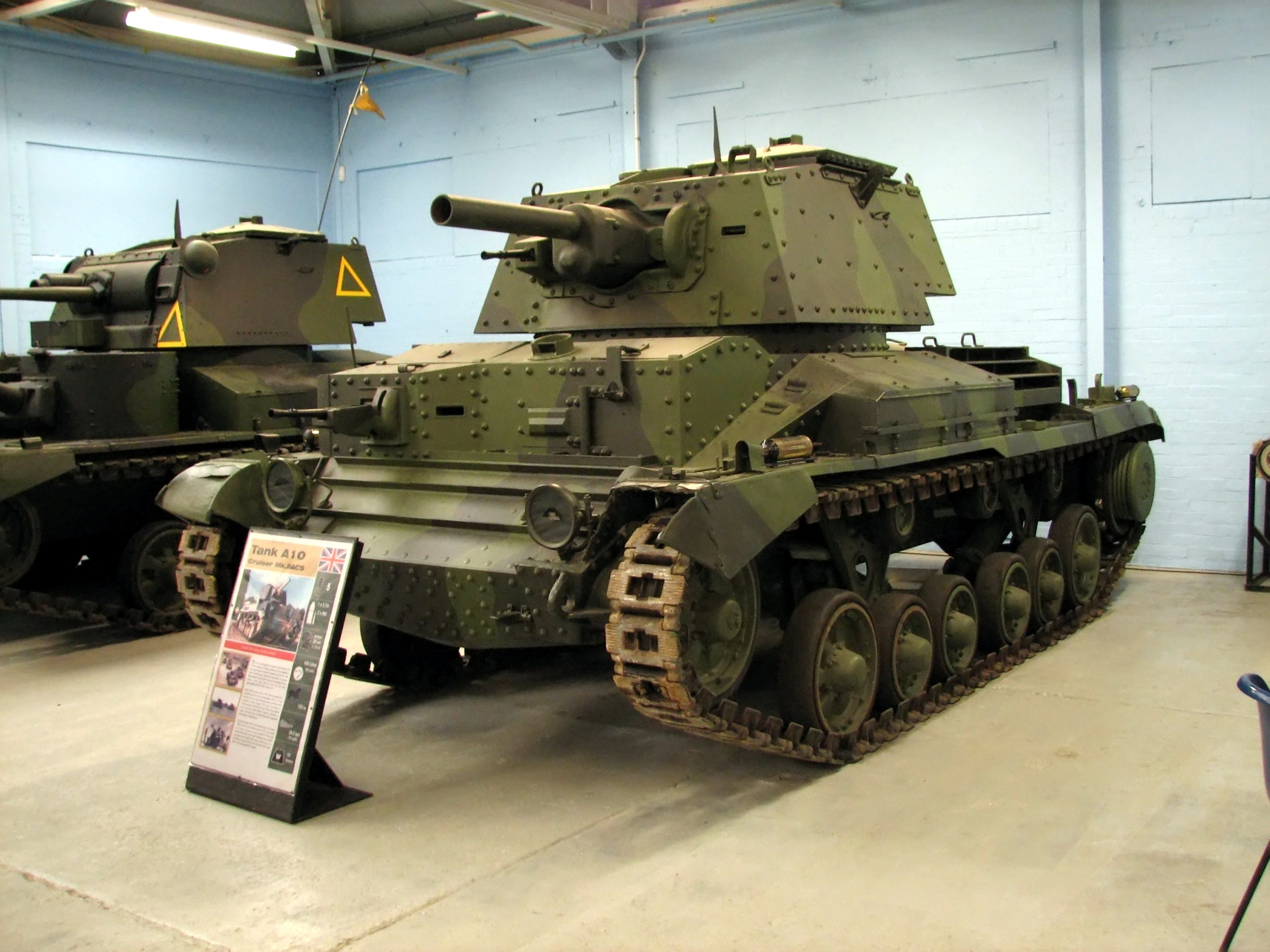
The division was equipped with Cruiser Mk II; this close support (CS) version of the tank was armed with a howitzer for firing smoke and high explosive rounds, and not intended to fight other tanks.

The division was held in reserve in the Lincolnshire area. In June, the number of serviceable tanks fluctuated between 178 and 197. After the Battle of France, the division was moved to a position between Northampton, Northamptonshire, and Newmarket, Suffolk to strike into the flanks or the rear of any potential German landing in East Anglia or north of The Wash. During July, the division was given equipment priority and received new 25-pounders. By 4 August, the division had 17 new cruiser tanks and the number of light tanks had increased to 226. During August, despite the threat of invasion, the War Office decided to reinforce Middle East Command. The 3rd Hussars was transferred to Egypt to reinforce the 7th Armoured Division; it was replaced by the 3rd Royal Tank Regiment (3rd RTR). (Note: This was in addition to two other armoured regiments, 48 anti-tank guns with 40,000 rounds, 20 light anti-aircraft guns with 30,000 rounds, forty-eight 25-pounders and 24,000 rounds, 500 machine guns, 250 anti-tank rifles, 50,000 anti-tank mines, one million rounds of .303 ammunition, wireless equipment, and 300 tons of spare parts.) The division had a steady increase in tank strength and at the end of September it had 256 light tanks and 54 cruisers.

By October, the threat of a German invasion had receded. The British could spare additional forces for the Mediterranean and Middle East theatre, including the 2nd Armoured Division. (Note: Between the end of August and the end of 1940, the following transfers took place: 76,000 men, including Australian and New Zealanders, were shipped from the UK to the Middle East; c. 50,000 troops were dispatched from Australia, India and New Zealand to the Middle East. These reinforcements included administration and supply units, Royal Air Force personnel and machines, reinforcements for depleted formations and new units including seven artillery regiments and five infantry brigades to bring existing divisions up to strength. Additional transfers included the 5th Indian Division and the 1st South African Division, although these went to East Africa.) Prior to being dispatched, the 22nd Armoured Brigade was exchanged for the 3rd Armoured Brigade of the 1st Armoured Division. The 3rd Armoured Brigade consisted of only one regiment, the 5th Royal Tank Regiment (5th RTR). The division departed Liverpool in late October, on Convoy W.S. 4a.

== Overseas service ==
=== Arrival in the Middle East ===
The convoy sailed around the Cape of Good Hope and arrived at Suez at the end of December. The division arrived in Egypt with just three armoured regiments: the 4H, the 3RTR, and the 5RTR. The KDG, which had previously been equipped with light tanks, had been made the division's armoured-car regiment. This had been intended as a stop-gap measure while the 1st The Royal Dragoons, based in Palestine, was mechanised to take on the role. In January 1941, after the division's arrival in Egypt, the KDG were outfitted with Marmon-Herrington Armoured Cars. On arrival, Tilly reported to General Archibald Wavell (in command of Middle East Command and all British land forces in the Middle East) that "the mechanical state of his two Cruiser regiments" was in question, with "the tracks ... practically worn out" and "engines [that] had already done a considerable mileage" without overhaul before being transported. The intention had been to replace the tracks once the tanks arrived in Egypt, but the available spare parts were found to be useless.

On 5 January, Tilly died following an air crash. He was replaced by Major-General Michael Gambier-Parry on 12 February 1941. Gambier-Parry had served in the infantry during the First World War, transferred to the Royal Tank Corps in the 1920s, and commanded an infantry brigade in the 1930s. Prior to his appointment as GOC, he was part of a diplomatic mission to Greece.

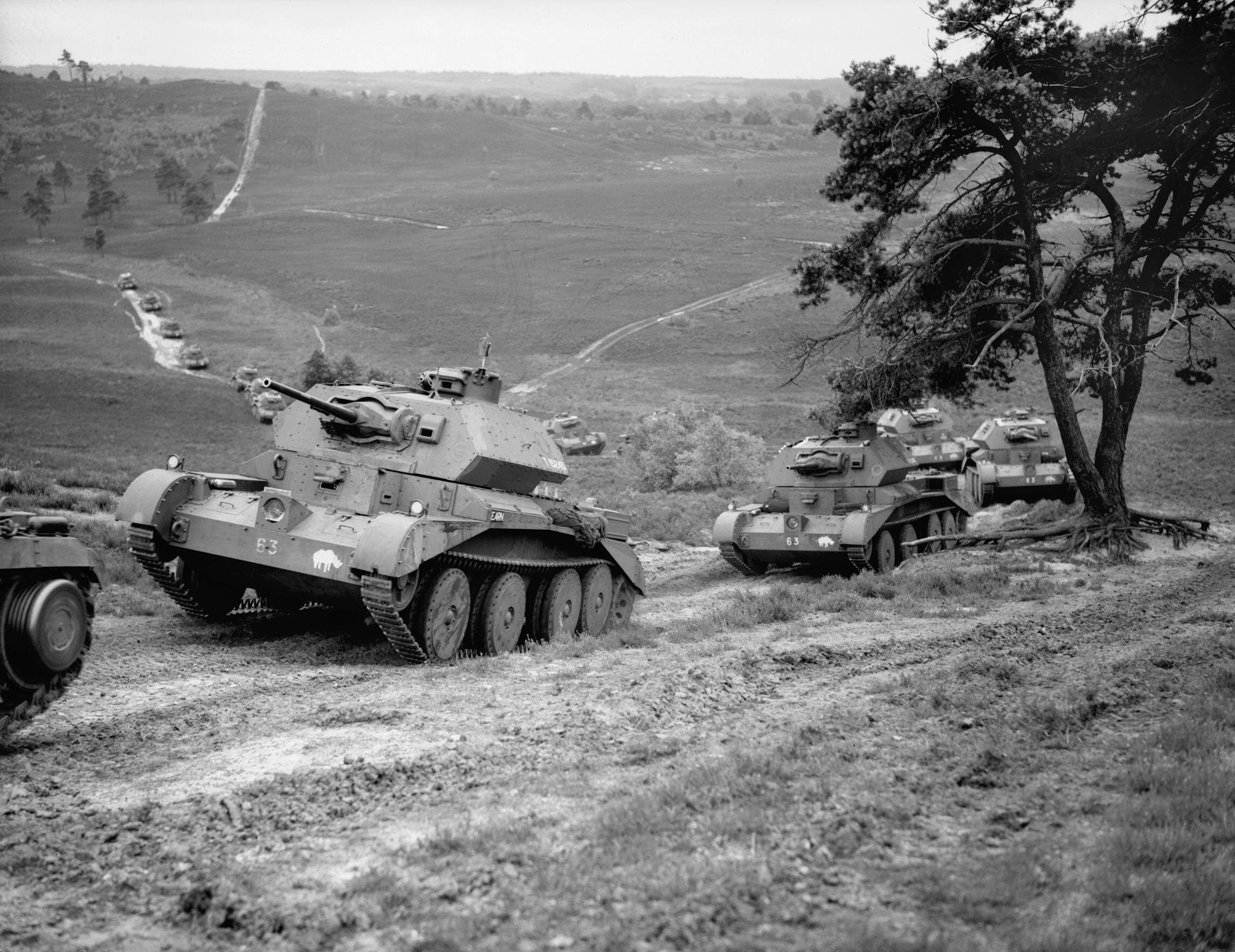
Cruiser IV tanks of the 5RTR, prior to their transfer to the division and deployment to Egypt.

While the division was en route to Egypt, Operation Compass had been launched. This was a counter-attack against the Italian invasion of Egypt. The initial objective was limited: to destroy forward Italian forces and advance as far as Sollum, near the Libyan border, if the situation allowed. By the time the division had arrived, Compass was on the verge of defeating the Italian 10th Army. By February, the offensive had captured the Italian Libyan province of Cyrenaica. Further prosecution of the offensive was discussed, but it was believed that the province of Tripolitania would be too hard to defend or supply if captured and that the occupation of Cyrenaica would provide sufficient security for Egypt. The British believed that there would not be an Axis threat to their gains until at least May, by which time additional Allied forces would be available to reinforce the Cyrenaica garrison.

British strategy shifted to supporting Greece, and to maintaining the status-quo in the Balkans, to prevent additional countries from being occupied by Germany or Italy. After discussions with the Greek government, it was decided to dispatch a substantial expeditionary force. This was partly made up by reducing the garrison in Cyrenaica. The transportation of this force was codenamed Operation Lustre. On 27 February, as a result, the 1st Armoured Brigade was detached from the division and assigned to the expeditionary force. On 18 March, it arrived in Greece with two armoured regiments, which included 52 cruisers and 52 light tanks. The division also lost the 1st Battalion, The Rangers, the 12RHA, and the 102nd (Northumberland Hussars) Regiment to the expeditionary force. (Note: The dispatch of the 102nd (Northumberland Hussars) Anti-Tank Regiment, for example, deprived the division of 578 men, 168 vehicles and forty-eight 2-pounder anti-tank guns.) These units subsequently fought in the Battle of Greece.

=== Move to Libya ===
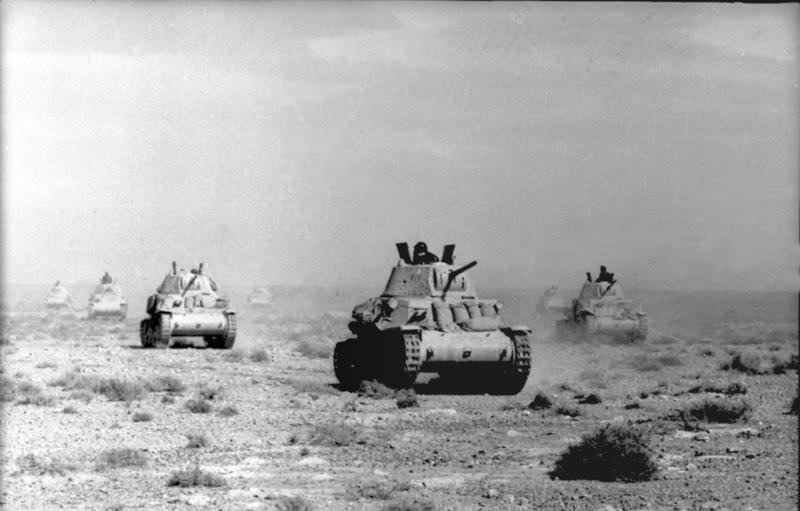
Captured Italian M13/40 tanks – similar to those shown above – were used by several units of the division notably the 6RTR.

In March, the remnants of the 2nd Armoured Division departed Egypt and travelled to Libya, suffering many breakdowns en route. The 5RTR began the journey with 58 cruisers, but arrived with 23. Once in Libya, the division consisted of the KDG, the 3H, the 5RTR, the 1st Tower Hamlets Rifles, and the 104th RHA. The 6th Royal Tank Regiment (6RTR), based in Cyrenaica, was assigned to the division. The 6RTR had been involved in Operation Compass, and towards the end of the operation had been stripped of its remaining serviceable tanks to reinforce other British units. It was then re-equipped with captured Italian Fiat M13/40 tanks. Although equipped with a good 47mm anti-tank gun, the M13 was slow, uncomfortable, and mechanically unreliable. The British tanks were also unreliable, having exceeded their engine lives. Other division deficiencies included a lack of transport, understaffed workshops, a lack of spare parts, and radios that lacked the required equipment to remain functional. By the end of March, the division had 102 tanks: 3H had 26 MK VI light tanks and 12 M13s; 5RTR, 25 Cruiser Mk IVs; 6RTR, 36 M13s; 3rd Armoured Brigade HQ, 3 MK VI light tanks.

Benghazi was the port closest to the frontline. However, Axis bombing had rendered it unusable for landing supplies. The 2nd Armoured Division therefore had to rely on overland routes from Tobruk, which was about 500 miles (805 km) away via the coastal road, or 400 miles (644 km) via desert tracks. A lack of transport meant the British Army created a series of static stockpiles to supply their forward area. This made it impossible to supply a garrison west of El Agheila, which was the most favourable defensive position. It also restricted the mobility of the 2nd Armoured Division, which could not move beyond the range of their supply dumps.

The terrain between El Agheila and Benghazi was optimal for armoured warfare, and no easily defensible infantry position existed. Lieutenant-General Philip Neame, GOC Cyrenaica Command, believed his position was untenable without a fully equipped armoured division supported by two complete infantry divisions and adequate air support. The only other major formation available to Neame was the 9th Australian Division. It was under-equipped, under-trained, and lacked direct communication with the 2nd Armoured Division. One of the 9th Australian Division's brigades remained at Tobruk. The other two were positioned north of Benghazi to hold the high ground of the Jebel Akhdar. The 3rd Armoured Brigade was based southeast of Mersa Brega, where the 2nd Support Group was located. Neame was ordered to give ground if attacked, as the conservation of his force was important. The 2nd Armoured Division had the conflicting objectives of avoiding tank losses while having to be ready to operate offensively against the flanks of any attacking Axis armoured force. Neame also predicted that once operations got underway, the 2nd Armoured Division's tank numbers would rapidly dwindle due to breakdowns.

=== Axis offensive ===
==== March ====
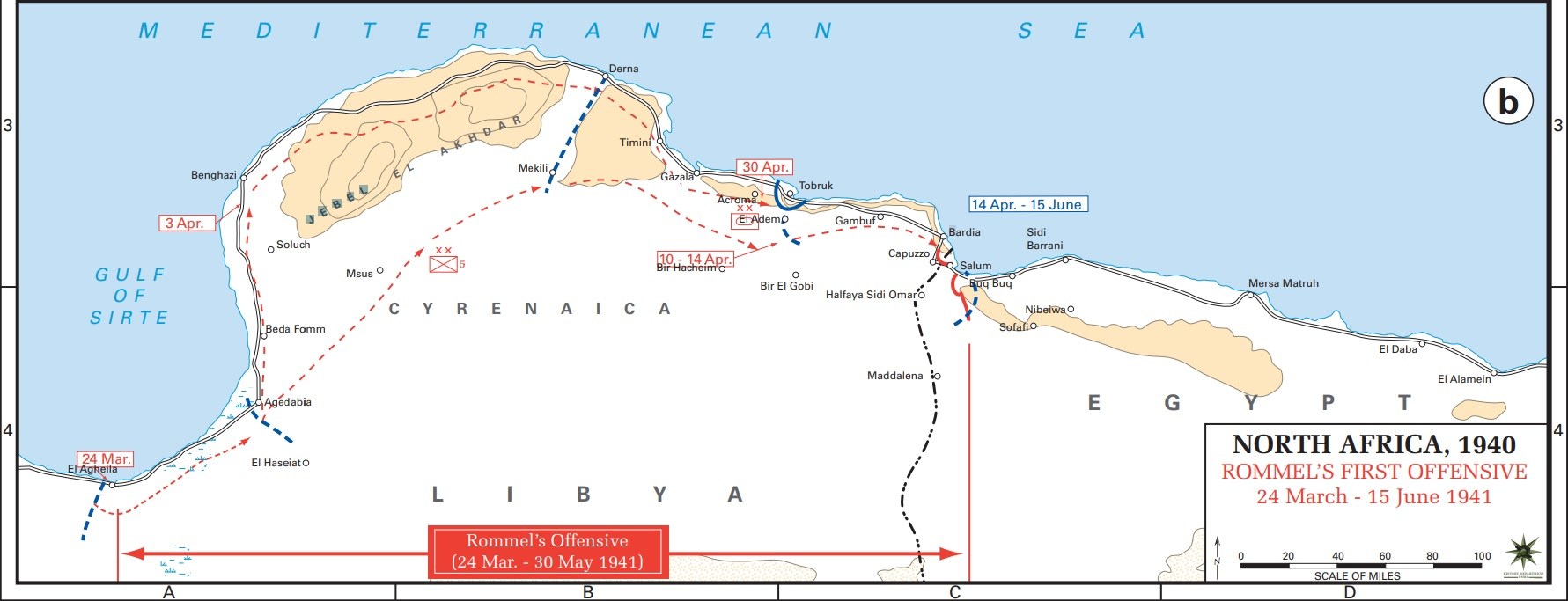
Map of Cyrenaica depicting the disposition of the 2nd Armoured Division, and the movement of Axis forces during March and April (enlargeable).

After the destruction of the 10th Army, Italy dispatched reinforcements to its frontline. This included four infantry divisions, the 102 Motorised Division "Trento" and the 132nd Armoured Division "Ariete". Germany supplemented this effort with the two-division strong Afrika Korps (Generalleutnant Erwin Rommel). At the end of March, the German 5th Light Division (147 tanks) and the "Ariete" Division (46 M13/40s) were on the border of Cyrenaica. (Note: The 5th Light Division had 25 Panzer I, 45 Panzer II, 60 Panzer III, and 17 Panzer IV tanks.) The British underestimated the size of the Axis effort, believing that only four divisions would be available to them until the end of May, of which only two could be used in offensive operations due to supply constraints. Royal Air Force (RAF) aerial reconnaissance observed Axis troop movements towards Cyrenaica, and on 25 February spotted German armoured cars that were superior in speed and armament to those used by the 2nd Armoured Division. The reconnaissance elements of the latter avoided contact with their German counterparts to minimise losses.

The British forward area was patrolled by one platoon from the 1st Tower Hamlets Rifles, supported by an anti-tank gun from the 9th Australian Division, and elements of the KDG. On 23 March, the division had its first action when a German reconnaissance patrol was engaged and forced to withdraw, near El Agheila, the Australians claiming three German vehicles knocked out. Axis forces took up position in an abandoned colonial fort near El Agheila and ambushed a patrol from the 1st Tower Hamlets Rifles the following day. German armoured cars also attacked and one was knocked out by the Australian gun crew, which also suffered casualties. The British screening force then withdrew to Mersa Brega, ceding El Agheila to the Axis. German tanks followed, and one or two were lost to anti-tank mines (possibly left over Italian mines, which had not been cleared).

On 31 March, the Axis resumed their advance, and engaged just after dawn. Sources describe either one engagement from both the British and German perspectives or two clashes. The German 5th Light Division reported engaging up to five British tanks, in two inconclusive engagements with no losses on either side. While observing the Axis advance, the 5RTR reported a patrol of four enemy tanks, which they engaged, claiming three Italian tanks possibly destroyed, with one British tank damaged in return. By 09:00, the 3rd Armoured Brigade started a planned withdrawal. After 10:00, German forces attacked the 2nd Support Group. Fighting lasted through the day, with the British fending off several assaults, including attacks by German Junkers Ju 87 Stuka dive bombers. The 2nd Armoured Division claimed two aircraft destroyed and the Germans recorded their own tanks being subjected to friendly fire. A request for the 3rd Armoured Brigade to be deployed to reinforce the 2nd Support Group was denied. Gambier-Parry reported that there was "insufficient time to get them into action from their present position before dark". After dark, the 2nd Support Group withdrew 30 miles (48 kilometres) to Agedabia. The Germans captured Mersa Brega the next morning, without further incident. The fighting cost the division 59 men, one tank, eight universal carriers and numerous other vehicles.

==== April ====
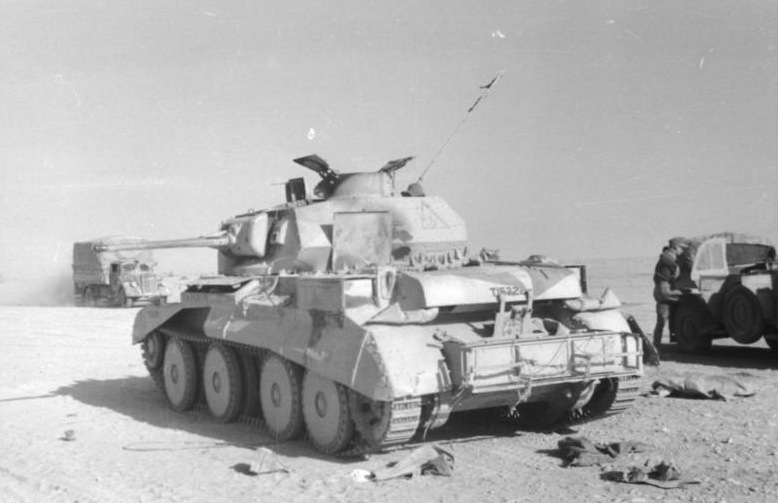
An abandoned Cruiser IV of the 5RTR.

The Germans followed, and attacked the 2nd Support Group on 2 April. The latter withdrew a further 30 miles (48 kilometres), and lost men in rearguard actions or to being surrounded. On the desert flank, the 3rd Armoured Brigade continued to withdraw, although only at 7 mph (11 km/h) in order to match the slowest vehicles, which were towing artillery. For most of the day, their movements were shadowed by armoured vehicles they were unable to identify. During the afternoon, the withdrawal was further slowed by breakdowns, conflicting orders, and the need to rest and refuel. This allowed the shadowing armoured vehicles to gain ground. Nine tanks from the 5RTR were ordered to conduct a rearguard action and took up hull-down positions. The 5RTR believed the shadowing tanks were Italian, although they were actually German. The German tanks advanced in an arrowhead formation towards the 5RTR. When the range was between 900 and 1,500 yards (823 and 1,372 metres), both sides opened fire. The 5RTR suffered five tank losses and 24 casualties. The 5RTR's after action report claimed at least eight enemy tanks in return, although German records indicate that only three German tanks were destroyed, "along with an unrecorded number damaged". The remaining British tanks withdrew to friendly positions, and the regiment regrouped 2 miles (3.2 kilometres) further back. The brigade then resumed its retreat, with no German vehicles following. During the day, Gambier-Parry, Neame, and Wavell all issued contradictory orders and queries to the division. These concerned the feasibility of withdrawal, the division's capacity to block the coastal road, and whether the division should remain concentrated or split up. The discussions were hampered by ignorance of events, and notably included Neame informing Gambier-Parry that the 3rd Armoured Brigade was not to be committed en masse without his permission.

Early on 3 April, the 3rd Armoured Brigade reached Antelat (~31 miles (50 km) northeast of Agedabia, and halfway to Msus), and had been located by German aerial reconnaissance. Unknown to the division, the bulk of the German 5th Light Division had halted near Bir el Ageradt and was focused on resupplying, although German and Italian detachments were ordered to probe the southern flank of the 2nd Armoured Division and reconnoitre towards Msus. In the afternoon, the movements of the 3H and the 6RTR caused alarm and confusion within the 5RTR, which at first believed them to be German. The RAF then reported Axis forces approaching Msus, the site of the main divisional supply dump. The 3rd Armoured Brigade, along with some elements of the Support Group, were ordered to move to Msus to deal with the hostile force. However, the division was crippled by a breakdown in communication, resulting in conflicting, late, and missed orders. None of the division arrived at Msus during the day. It was established late in the afternoon that the RAF had mistakenly identified friendly vehicles in the area as the enemy. By the end of the day, the 3rd Armoured Brigade had been reduced to 18 light tanks, 26 M13s, and 12 cruisers.

On 4 April, Axis forces entered Benghazi, which had been abandoned by the Allies. During the day, divisional artillery fire halted German reconnaissance forces near Charruba. At midday, Lieutenant-General Richard O'Connor (GOC British Troops in Egypt) arrived at the front and held a meeting with the senior commanders in Cyrenaica, including Gambier-Parry, who opined that the Axis forces would not attempt a further advance now that Benghazi had been taken. However, the decision was made to withdraw from the Jebel Achdar, and for the 2nd Armoured Division to concentrate at Mechili to protect the withdrawal of the Australian infantry. Brigadier Edward Vaughan's recently arrived 3rd Indian Motor Brigade was ordered to secure Mechili, an old Italian stone-and-mud colonial fort ringed by trenches, to ensure it was in Allied hands when the division arrived. Communication failures impeded the division's withdrawal during the day, and further tanks were lost from breakdowns. A supply convoy dispatched for the division was attacked by 18 Axis aircraft, and destroyed with the loss of 1,600 imperial gallons (7,300 L) of fuel. By the end of the day, the 5RTR had nine cruiser tanks, and the 6RTR had nine M13s. The following day, alarmist reports suggested Axis armoured forces had passed Msus; but the KDG, and other Allied units, verified that this was not the case. The tank sightings turned out to be the 2nd Armoured Division. In reality, the nearest Axis unit was 20 miles (32 kilometres) from Msus.

=== General withdrawal ===
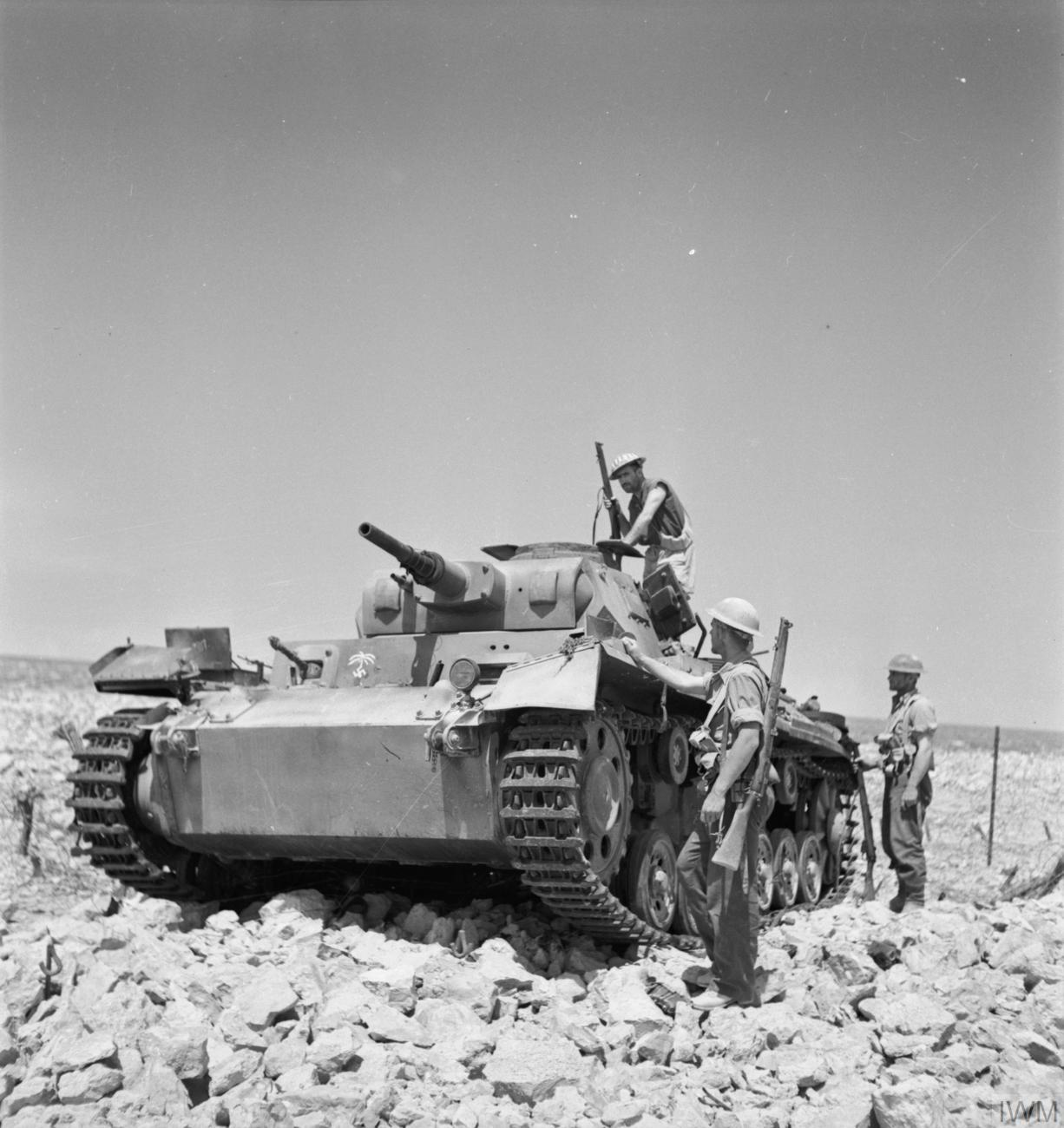
An example of the German Panzer III, the most common tank in the German Afrika Korps during this period.

On 6 April, Axis forces moved towards Mechili, with the intention of advancing toward the coast, and thereby encircling the retreating Allied forces. This move was reported by the KDG and the RAF. The division started the day with 8 cruiser tanks, 14 light tanks, and 2 M13s. During the day, the 3rd Indian Motor Brigade was attached to the division. (Note: The brigade comprised the 2nd Lancers (Gardner's Horse), the 11th Prince Albert Victor's Own Cavalry (Frontier Force), and the 18th King Edward's Own Cavalry. These battalions were motorised infantry, and lacked artillery, anti-tank weapons, and had half of the required wireless sets. The 3rd Indian Motor Brigade was joined by elements of the Australian 2/3rd Anti-Tank Regiment and the British 3rd Royal Horse Artillery (an anti-tank unit). They formed a perimeter around the fort, and dispatched patrols.) Mechili was subjected to Axis artillery fire, and Indian patrols took numerous Axis prisoners around the perimeter throughout the day. Neame, unaware of these events, set off into the desert to locate Gambier-Parry to deliver new instructions. At the same time, the attack on the fort prompted O'Connor to order a general withdrawal of all Allied forces towards Gazala, via Derna.

Conflicting and confusing orders to withdraw were issued, which fragmented the division, the withdrawal orders failing entirely to reach the 3rd Indian Motor Brigade. At first, the division moved east towards Mechili. Following its instructions, the 2nd Support Group turned north towards the coastal road. The divisional headquarters, including Gambier-Parry and a battery of artillery, continued towards Mechili. The 3rd Armoured Brigade, which had run low on fuel, moved north to Maraura, but found little petrol there. The brigade then moved towards Derna, via Giovanni Berta. At the same time, the 3rd Indian Motor Brigade escorted a fuel convoy from Mechili towards where they expected the division to be. In the afternoon, a patrol of the 3rd Indian Motor Brigade, based at El Adem, intercepted advanced Italian troops at Acroma, near Tobruk, and took 18 prisoners. A buildup of Axis forces took place near Mechili. Towards dusk, a German officer demanded the garrison's surrender and was refused. Near Derna, German troops briefly managed to block some desert tracks, before moving to a position near the coastal road east of the town. German patrols intercepted and disrupted some Allied convoys, and captured Neame and O'Connor, but the route east remained open until the following day.

Early on 7 April, Brigadier Reginald Rimington, GOC 3rd Armoured Brigade, was mortally wounded and captured after an ambush on a desert track en route to Derna. By dawn, the 2nd Support Group and the 3rd Armoured Brigade were stretched out, stuck in traffic west of Derna; Gambier-Parry and the 3rd Indian Motor Brigade had been surrounded at Mechili; and other elements of the division were positioned near Derna to control the road and desert tracks, fighting with Axis forces intermittently throughout the day. At Timimi, near Gazala, Axis armoured cars ambushed retreating Australian forces, but were repulsed by a lone cruiser tank from the 5RTR, whose remaining tanks arrived at Derna in the afternoon. By 14:30, the majority of the division had moved through Derna. To the south of Derna, German forces had captured the town's airfield and established a blocking position. The division's rearguard, now separated from the rest of the division, fought an afternoon-long battle with this German force. Several German attacks were fended off, with eight German armoured cars claimed as destroyed. Around 17:15, the 5RTR attacked the German position and lost their remaining tanks but successfully covered the withdrawal of the remainder of the rearguard. Barton Maughan, author of the Australian official history for this period of the fighting, wrote "by coincidence ... the 5th Royal Tanks ... [were] where they were most needed and could be most effectively employed that day". The British official history recorded "the action cleared the road also for any troops that remained in Derna" as well as allowing the rearguard to get away.

=== Demise ===
At Mechili, on 7 April, the Germans continued to build up their forces surrounding the British position. The garrison was subjected to intermittent artillery fire, and skirmishing took place around the perimeter. Two separate German envoys demanded the garrison surrender, and both demands were refused by Gambier-Parry. Around 22:00, Gambier-Parry re-established communication with Cyrenaica Command. He was informed that neither the rest of his division nor any other force would be joining him, and was ordered to break out at first light, with El Adem his destination.

The planned break-out was to be led by a single cruiser tank, with infantry support from the 3rd Indian Motor Brigade. The intent was to use a small force to punch a hole through the Axis defensive positions prior to dawn, to negate the Axis anti-tank gun advantage; that would then be followed by the rest of the force east into the desert. Maughan wrote, "If the original plan had been adhered to, if it had been boldly executed, a great measure of success might have been achieved. But the operation miscarried badly". On 8 April, the tank was delayed and the cover of dark lost. Despite this, the 18th King Edward's Own Cavalry (18th Cavalry) achieved surprise when they attacked and scattered the personnel of an Italian battery. Instead of exploiting this success, the rest of the escape column waited for the cruiser tank to advance. A second attack was launched by the 11th Prince Albert Victor's Own Cavalry (Frontier Force), which likewise broke through the Axis defenses. However, the cruiser tank was destroyed when it advanced towards the battery silenced by the 18th Cavalry; the Italians had returned to their guns.

Following this Allied failure, the Axis forces attacked the garrison. Gambier-Parry decided to surrender, to spare further casualties, and fighting ceased by 08:00. Roughly 3,000 Allied troops were captured at Mechili, including Gambier-Parry and Vaughan. A force of at least 150 men, from the 3rd RHA and the 2nd Lancers (Gardner's Horse), refused to capitulate. They charged, unmolested, through Axis positions in non-armoured vehicles. The majority of this small force made it to Tobruk, taking prisoners en route. Elements of the 6RTR, which had failed to reach Derna prior to the Axis arrival, moved south into the desert to avoid contact. They continued east, before meeting British reconnaissance forces near El Adem on 10 April, and reached Tobruk just prior to midnight. On 10 May 1941, the 2nd Armoured Division was disbanded. The units that constituted the division continued the war with other formations. In October 1941, XXX Corps was formed with officers largely from the remnants of the 2nd Armoured Division HQ staff.

=== Assessment ===
"This division [has not] had an opportunity for adequate training... It was a collection of units, three of which had only [just] joined... rather than a trained formation. The breakdown in control and administration was largely due to this fact". – From a contemporary after action report, by 2nd Armoured Division senior officers.

An unnamed officer from the division later blamed the division's fate on Gambier-Parry, whom he called "a conventional and slow minded soldier who couldn't cope with the unexpected". The historian David French wrote that some critics, such as Major-General David Belchem, blamed the poor performance of British armoured formations in the desert on officers who had cavalry backgrounds and knew little of armoured warfare. French wrote "such strictures are exaggerated", highlighted that Gambier-Parry started his career in the infantry before he transferred to the Royal Tank Corps, and stated that singling him out for blame is harsh.

Several factors have been identified as key reasons for the division's rapid decline in tank strength and ineffectiveness in the face of Axis forces: tanks that were not serviceable, an inadequate logistical support system, a lack of training, a burdensome chain of command, and ineffective communications. The 5RTR lost 38 tanks in Libya, but only nine were lost to enemy action. With the exception of one that was destroyed when it hit a thermos bomb, the rest had broken down. The lack of a forward port or railhead meant that supplies had to be moved at least 350 miles (560 km), but there was insufficient transport to build up a sufficient stockpile of supplies for the division. The division's staff were undertrained for the task they were asked to perform. While brave, the tank crews were inflexible and failed to follow their tactical training. British tactical doctrine encouraged ambush counter-attacks, but the formation failed to undertake any. At the squadron and regimental level, the chain of command impeded mobility, as permission was needed to move a single tank from an assigned position. This resulted in rapid tank losses once combat was underway. At the higher level, the division received instructions from Gambier-Parry, Neame, Wavell, and O'Connor. This overlapping chain of command resulted in delayed, misunderstood, mixed, and changed orders that severely impeded the division's capability.

Due to these factors, the general and historian David Fraser wrote, once "the Germans chose to drive across the chord of the Cyrenaican arc there was little to stop them". At no point during the Axis advance, did the division offer a threat or hindrance. However, when they did engage, both sides lacked flexibility and acted against their own doctrines. Furthermore, the German lack of understanding of what the 2nd Armoured Division was doing resulted in their 5th Light Division having to send 83 tanks to workshops for repairs after they had chased the 2nd Armoured Division through the desert.

== General officer commanding ==
Appointed	General Officer Commanding
15 December 1939	Major-General F. E. Hotblack
17 April 1940	Brigadier C. W. M. Norrie (acting)
10 May 1940	Major-General J. C. Tilly (died on 5 January 1941)
16 January 1941	Brigadier H. B. Latham (acting)
12 February 1941	Major-General M. D. Gambier-Parry (captured, 8 April 1941)

== Orders of battle ==
=== December 1939 – October 1940 ===
1st Light Armoured Brigade (assigned 19 January 1940, and renamed the 1st Armoured Brigade on 14 April)

- 3rd (The King's Own) Hussars (until 14 August 1940)
- 4th Queen's Own Hussars
- 1st King's Dragoon Guards
- 3rd Battalion, Royal Tank Regiment (from 11 August 1940)

22nd Heavy Armoured Brigade (assigned 15 January 1940, and renamed the 22nd Armoured Brigade on 14 April)

- 2nd Royal Gloucestershire Hussars
- 3rd County of London Yeomanry (Sharpshooters)
- 4th County of London Yeomanry (Sharpshooters)

3rd Armoured Brigade (assigned 5 October 1940)

- 5th Battalion, Royal Tank Regiment

2nd Support Group (assigned 5 February 1940)

- 1st Battalion The Rangers, The King's Royal Rifle Corps
- 1st Battalion, Tower Hamlets Rifles (Rifle Brigade (Prince Consort's Own))
- 102nd (Northumberland Hussars) Light Anti-Aircraft/Anti-Tank Regiment
- 12th Regiment, Royal Horse Artillery (until 7 August 1940)
- 2nd Regiment, Royal Horse Artillery (from 11 July 1940)
- 3rd Field Squadron, Royal Engineers (until 9 June 1940)
- 142nd Field Park Troop (from 30 March 1940 until 9 June)

Divisional troops

- 2nd Armoured Divisional Signals, Royal Corps of Signals
- Royal Engineers
  - 3rd Field Squadron (assigned 10 June 1940)
  - 142nd Field Park Troop (assigned 10 June 1940)

=== Libya, 1941 ===
3rd Armoured Brigade

- 3rd (The King's Own) Hussars
- 5th Battalion, Royal Tank Regiment
- 6th Battalion, Royal Tank Regiment

3rd Indian Motor Brigade (6–8 April 1941)

- 2nd Lancers (Gardner's Horse)
- 11th Prince Albert Victor's Own Cavalry (Frontier Force)
- 18th King Edward's Own Cavalry

2nd Support Group

- 1st Battalion, Tower Hamlets Rifles, redesignated as 9th Battalion, Rifle Brigade (Tower Hamlets Rifles) from 5 January 1941
- 1st Company, Free French 1st Motor Marine Infantry Battalion (attached)
- 102nd (Northumberland Hussars) Anti-Tank Regiment
- 104th (Essex Yeomanry) Regiment, Royal Horse Artillery

Divisional troops

- 1st King's Dragoon Guards (Armoured Car, divisional reconnaissance regiment until 22 March 1941) (Note: Joslen listed this regiment as a divisional asset from January through May 1941, but also as part of 3rd Armoured Brigade for the period 26 February until 22 March 1941.)
- 2nd Armoured Divisional Signals

== See also ==
- British Army during the Second World War
- British Armoured formations of World War II
- List of British divisions in World War II

== Notes ==
Footnotes

Citations
