= Justice Tilly =

British Army general

Major-General Justice Tilly DSO MC
- Born: 27 January 1888; Bedford, Bedfordshire, England
- Died: 5 January 1941 (aged 52)
- Military career
- Allegiance: United Kingdom
- Branch: British Army
- Service years: 1907–1941
- Rank: Major-General
- Unit: Leicestershire Regiment
- Commands: 2nd Armoured Division (1940–41); 1st Tank Brigade (1938–39); 5th Battalion, Tank Corps (1934)
- Conflicts: First World War; North-West Frontier; Second World War
- Awards: Distinguished Service Order; Military Cross; Mentioned in Despatches

Major-General Justice Crosland Tilly, DSO, MC (27 January 1888 – 5 January 1941) was a British Army officer who commanded the 2nd Armoured Division during the early stages of the Second World War.

== Military career ==
Born in Bedford on 27 January 1888, and coming from a military family, Tilly was commissioned into the Leicestershire Regiment (later the Royal Leicestershire Regiment) on 12 November 1907. His service in the years prior to the First World War were spent with the King's African Rifles in British East Africa. During the war he served on the Western Front with the Machine Gun Corps, being wounded, mentioned in despatches, and being awarded both the Military Cross and the Distinguished Service Order. The citation for his DSO reads:

For conspicuous gallantry and devotion to duty during lengthy operations, when he displayed great courage and initiative in organising Tanks for action and leading them to their starting points. Later, in command of Lewis gun teams, his skill in handling the various groups during a rearguard action largely contributed to the successful withdrawal of the infantry.

Remaining in the army during the difficult interwar period, Tilly married in 1919 before transferring to the West Yorkshire Regiment, with which he served on the North-West Frontier of India until 1924. After transferring again, this time to the Royal Tank Corps (later the Royal Tank Regiment) in 1927, he attended the Senior Officers' School, Sheerness in 1931. After commanding the 5th Battalion, Tank Corps in 1934 he became Chief Instructor at the Royal Tank Corps Central School in Bovington in 1935 and then Chief Instructor of the Gunnery Wing at the Armoured Fighting Vehicles School at Lulworth in 1937.

Tilly went on to be commander of the 1st Tank Brigade from 1938 to 1939 and then served in the Second World War. In May 1940 he was promoted to major general and made General Officer Commanding of the 2nd Armoured Division, holding this post until he was killed in a motor accident in January 1941, after his division had been sent to North Africa. He left behind a widow and a daughter.

== Bibliography ==
- Joslen, H. F. (2003) [1960]. Orders of Battle: Second World War, 1939–1945. Uckfield, East Sussex: Naval and Military Press. ISBN 978-1-84342-474-1.
- Smart, Nick (2005). Biographical Dictionary of British Generals of the Second World War. Barnesley: Pen & Sword. ISBN 1844150496.

Military offices
Preceded by Frederick Hotblack	GOC 2nd Armoured Division; 1940–1941	Succeeded by Michael Gambier-Parry
