= 1st Armoured Brigade (United Kingdom) =

Armoured Brigade of the British army during World War II

1st Light Armoured Brigade 1st Armoured Brigade 1st Armoured Brigade Group
- Active: Until November 1942
- Country: United Kingdom
- Branch: British Army
- Type: Armoured formation
- Role: Armoured warfare
- Size: Brigade
- Part of: BEF; Force HQ Greece; Eighth Army
- Engagements: Battle of France; Battle of Mount Olympus; Second Battle of El Alamein

Commanders
- Brigadier: Willoughby Norrie, 1st Baron Norrie
- (Acting) Lieutenant-Colonel: Reginald Keller

The 1st Armoured Brigade, raised as the 1st Light Armoured, on 14 April 1940 its designation changed to 1st Armoured Brigade Group, an armoured formation of the British Army.

== History ==
At the start of World War II, the brigade was based in the United Kingdom, initially as part of the 1st Armoured Division and then as part of the newly formed 2nd Armoured Division. In November 1940, it was shipped to Egypt, arriving on 1 January 1941. In March 1941, the brigade was dispatched to Greece as part of General Maitland Wilson's unsuccessful attempt at stopping the German invasion. On 29 April 1941, the brigade was evacuated to Egypt.

The 1st Armoured Brigade served in the Western Desert Campaign with the 7th Armoured Division at the Battle of El Alamein. The brigade was used for tank delivery from August to October 1942 before being disbanded on 21 November 1942.

== Order of Battle ==
The Order of battle of the brigade during the war was units in order of precedence.

Armoured Brigade Establishment

- Brigade Headquarters & Signal Section, Royal Corps of Signals
- 1st (The King's) Dragoon Guards 3/9/39– 5 June 1942
- 3rd (The King's Own) Hussars 3/9/39–24 January 1941
- 4th (The Queen's Own) Hussars 3/9/39–5/6/42
- 8th (The King's Royal Irish) Hussars 10 May 1941–8 August 1941
- 1st Royal Tank Regiment 21/1/42–1/6/42
- 3rd Royal Tank Regiment 11/8/40–28/10/40 and again 13/2/41–8/8/41
- 6th Royal Tank Regiment 5/5/42–5/6/42
- 1st Battalion, The Rangers 25/2/41 – 11/2/42 (renamed "9th (The Rangers) Battalion, The King's Royal Rifle Corps" in March 1941)

Greece Deployment Group (The following units were attached when the brigade was engaged in Greece between 26/02/41–1/05/41)

- 2nd Regiment, Royal Horse Artillery (Field artillery)
- 102nd (Northumberland Hussars) Anti-Tank Regiment, Royal Artillery
- 55th Light Anti-Aircraft Regiment, Royal Artillery
- 3 Field Squadron, Royal Engineers
- 142 Field Park Squadron, Royal Engineers
- 1st Armoured Brigade Company, Royal Army Service Corps
- 1st Support Group Company, Royal Army Service Corps
- 4th Light Field Ambulance, Royal Army Medical Corps

Armoured Brigade Group (March–June 1942)

- 11th Battalion, The Nottinghamshire and Derbyshire Regiment (Sherwood Foresters)
- 104th (Essex Yeomanry) Regiment, Royal Horse Artillery (Field artillery)
- 7 Field Troop, Royal Engineers to 4/5/42
- 20 Field Troop, Royal Engineers from 4/5/42
- 67 Company, Royal Army Service Corps
- 307 Company, Royal Army Service Corps
- 12th Light Field Ambulance, Royal Army Medical Corps

== Commanding officers ==
Commanding officers of the brigade included:

- Brigadier Willoughby Norrie 3/9/39–17 April 40
- (Acting) Colonel C. F. Ledward 17 April 40 – 12 April 40
- Brigadier Harold 'Rollie' Vincent Spencer Charrington 11 April 1940 – 2 June 1941
- (Acting) Lieutenant-Colonel Reginald Keller 2 June 1941–16 June 1941
- Brigadier Harold 'Rollie' Vincent Spencer Charrington 16 June41–20 June41
- (Acting) Lieutenant-Colonel Reginald Keller 20 June41–26/7/41
- (Acting) Lieutenant-Colonel Henry Dinham Drew 26/7/41–30/7/41
- Brigadier Edward Cecille Neville Custance 30/7/41–20/9/41
- (Acting) Lieutenant-Colonel W. I. Leethan 20/9/41–26/10/41
- Brigadier Douglas Arnold Stirling 26/10/41–23/11/41
- (Acting) Lieutenant-Colonel R. B. Sheppard 23/11/41–27/3/42
- Brigadier Arthur Fisher 27 March 42 – 26 June 42
- Brigadier George Herbert Norris Todd 26 June 42 – 21 November 42

== See also ==
- British Armoured formations of World War II
- List of British brigades of the Second World War
