= Hugo Ironside =

British Army officer (1918–2008)

- Born: 14 June 1918; Thrapston, Northamptonshire, England
- Died: 3 October 2008 (aged 90); Fleet, Hampshire, England
- Military career
- Allegiance: United Kingdom
- Branch: British Army
- Service years: 1938–1968
- Rank: Brigadier
- Service number: 77706
- Unit: Royal Tank Regiment
- Commands: 8th Royal Tank Regiment; 5th Royal Tank Regiment
- Conflicts: World War II
- Awards: Officer of the Order of the British Empire

Brigadier Hugo Craster Wakeford Ironside OBE (14 June 1918 – 3 October 2008) was a British Army officer who, during World War II, tunnelled out of a Prisoner of War camp and later helped construct a glider, known as the 'Colditz Cock'.

== Background ==
Hugo Ironside was born in Thrapston, Northamptonshire, and educated at St Edward's School, Oxford. He was offered a place at the Royal Air Force College Cranwell, but was warned that, if he joined the Royal Air Force (RAF), he would probably be dead within two years. Instead, Ironside won a cadetship to the Royal Military College, Sandhurst and was commissioned into the Royal Tank Regiment in 1938.

== World War II ==
Ironside landed at Calais with the 3rd Royal Tank Regiment (3RTR) on 20 May 1940 in the final phase of the battle for the port. Five days later, 3RTR was out of ammunition and petrol. The order was given "Every man for himself". Ironside and his platoon started marching along the beach towards Dunkirk. They were captured in the early hours of the morning. During the next two weeks, the men were force-marched to Trier, approximately 300 miles away. Food was so scarce for the men that they had to break away from the main group and risk being shot by the guards in order to scrounge food.

From Trier, Ironside was moved between Oflag VII-C Laufen (Germany), Stalag XXI-D Poznań (Poland), Oflag V-B Biberach and Oflag VI-B Doessel-Warburg Prisoner of War camps before being sent to Oflag VII-B at Eichstätt, Bavaria. There he helped to work on a tunnel which started in a lavatory in one of the brick blocks. This was used for an escape of over 50 men, who were recaptured and sent to Oflag IV-C, Colditz.

== Later military service ==
After the war, Ironside continued his military career, alternating between staff and regimental appointments.

Ironside was promoted to captain in 1946, and major in 1951.

In 1955 Ironside was awarded the OBE.

Promoted to Brevet Lieutenant Colonel 1957 and full Lieutenant Colonel in Aug 1958, Ironside took command of the 8th Royal Tank Regiment (8RTR) in Fallingbostel, BAOR. He was subsequently responsible for the amalgamation of 8RTR and 5RTR in 1959.

Promoted to colonel in 1962 on General Staff RAC at the War Office. In December 1966 he was promoted to brigadier RAC HQ Western Command, then Brigadier at the MoD as Director of Operational Requirements, at the end of which he retired from the Army in April 1968.

== Later life ==
Ironside married Tonita M. Harbord in Chelsea in 1945 and they had a son and daughter. His first marriage was dissolved and he remarried Carolyn John in 1977. Following her death, Ironside remarried again, to Janet N. O'Gorman, in 2001.

Following retirement, he managed a yacht marina in Dorset and then ran an investment company. From 1972 to 1982 he worked at the Central Office of Information. He enjoyed golf, flying kites, and dismantling cars.

Hugo Ironside died 3 October 2008, aged 90.
