= Thermos (disambiguation) =

Thermos most commonly refers to:

- Thermos L.L.C., a brand of domestic vacuum flasks
- A vacuum flask, also commonly referred to as a "thermos"

Thermos may refer to:

- Thermos (Aetolia), an ancient Greek city, the capital city of the Aetolian League
- A thermos bomb, the AR-4 anti-personnel bomb used during World War II
- A No. 73 grenade, an anti-tank hand grenade of World War II
- Thermos, a 1990 album by Bailter Space

== See also ==
- Thermus (disambiguation)
