= Fred Kite =

- Born: 5 January 1921; Newcastle-under-Lyme, Staffordshire, England
- Died: 25 May 1993 (aged 72)
- Military career
- Allegiance: United Kingdom
- Branch: British Army
- Service years: 1938–1945
- Rank: Sergeant
- Nickname: Buck
- Unit: 3rd Royal Tank Regiment
- Conflicts: Second World War; North African campaign; Battle of Normandy; Battle for Caen; Operation Goodwood
- Awards: Military Medal & Two Bars

Frederick William Kite, MM & Two Bars (5 January 1921 – 25 May 1993), known as Buck, was a highly decorated British soldier who fought in the Second World War.

== Early life ==
Kite was born in Newcastle-under-Lyme in 1921. He attended Hassell Street School followed by The Orme School. At the age of 17 years he joined the 3rd Royal Tank Regiment.

== Second World War ==
For gallantry in action, Kite received the Military Medal and two Bars. He received the Military Medal for bravery in North Africa in January 1943 when engaged on a special reconnaissance mission. The first Bar was awarded for leadership, initiative and personal courage during action near the village of Bras, Normandy in July 1944. The second Bar was awarded for great personal courage before being seriously wounded at Le Grand Bonfait, Normandy.

His third Military Medal was awarded for the "greatest personal courage and his example of remaining in action against odds that were much against him". The action took place on 3 August 1944 at Le Grand Bonfait where Kite was commanding one of several tanks on the edge of an orchard. His position was attacked by at least one Tiger and four Panther tanks. He held the position although all his unit's other tanks was put out of action. He made at least five direct hits on enemy tanks at short range before he was hit himself and seriously wounded.

Field Marshal Bernard Montgomery's signature appeared on all three citations, first as General Officer Commanding Eighth Army, then as Commander-in-Chief 21st Army Group, and finally as field marshal.

Kite also saw action in Egypt, Crete and Greece, rising to the rank of sergeant. King George VI presented his medals to him at Buckingham Palace.

Kite died in 1993 at the age of 72. He has the unique distinction of being the only member of the British Army to receive the Military Medal three times in the Second World War.

== In popular culture ==
The fictional character Sgt. Paddy Donovan in Peter Elstob's novel Warriors For the Working Day is based on Kite's career in the Battle of Normandy.
