= 3rd Armoured Brigade (United Kingdom) =

Armoured brigade of the British Army in the Second World War

1st Heavy Armoured Brigade 3rd Armoured Brigade
- Active: September 1939 – November 1943
- Country: United Kingdom
- Branch: British Army
- Type: Armoured formation
- Role: Armoured warfare
- Size: Brigade

The 3rd Armoured Brigade, before 14 April 1940 designated the 1st Heavy Armoured Brigade, was an armoured brigade of the British Army that saw service in the Second World War with the 1st Armoured Division and the 2nd Armoured Division in the North African Campaign. The brigade headquarters was disbanded on 11 January 1943.

== Order of battle ==
The 3rd Armoured Brigade:

- 2nd Royal Tank Regiment (until 11 August 1940)
- 3rd Royal Tank Regiment (until 22 May, re-joined 19 June, left 30 June 1940, re-joined again 29 October 1940, left again 25 January 1941)
- 5th Royal Tank Regiment (until 18 February 1941, re-joined 24 March, left 14 April 1941)
- 1st King's Dragoon Guards (from 26 February until 22 March 1941)
- 3rd The King's Own Hussars (from 26 February until 14 April 1941)
- 6th Royal Tank Regiment (from 28 February until 14 April 1941)
- 1st Royal Tank Regiment (from 9 to 18 May 1941)
- D Squadron, 7th Royal Tank Regiment (from 16 May until 18 September 1941)

== Commanders ==
- Brigadier Vyvyan Pope (until 20 April 1940)
- Brigadier John Crocker (from 20 April until 21 September 1940)
- Brigadier R. G. W. Rimington (from 21 September 1940 until 8 April 1941)
- Lieutenant-Colonel H. D. Drew (Acting, from 8 April until 2 June 1941)
- Colonel G. M. O. Davy (Acting, from 2 June until 18 July 1941)
- Lieutenant Colonel F. Brown (Acting, from 18 to 29 July 1941)
- Colonel R. C. Keller (Acting, from 29 July 1941)

== See also ==
- British Armoured formations of World War II
- British brigades of the Second World War
- British Expeditionary Force order of battle (1940)

== Bibliography ==
- Nafziger, George (1992). "Organization of British Armored Brigades; Structure and Brigade Elemental Assignments by Regiment 1939–1945" (PDF). Archived from the original (PDF) on 4 March 2016.
- Taylor, Dick (2022). Armoured Warfare in the British Army 1939–1945. Pen & Sword Military. ISBN 978-1-39-908103-0.

== See also ==
- List of British brigades of the Second World War
