= Warriors for the Working Day =

1960 novel by Peter Elstob

First edition (publ. Coward-McCann)

Warriors for the Working Day is a novel written by Peter Elstob, published in 1960, with later translations into other languages. The novel is based on events from June 1944, during the Battle of Normandy, to the invasion of Germany in the spring of 1945. The book describes fighting by the men of a small unit of British tanks during this period, with the focus on one tank crew. The novel is highly realistic, as it is based on Elstob's experience. The title is taken from Henry V, Act 4, Scene 3 (Shakespeare) before the Battle of Agincourt. King Henry replies to the French herald, Mountjoy,

Let me speak proudly: tell the constable

We are but warriors for the working-day; Our gayness and our gilt are all besmirch'd With rainy marching in the painful field; There's not a piece of feather in our host-- Good argument, I hope, we will not fly-- And time hath worn us into slovenry:

But, by the mass, our hearts are in the trim.

The title appears to imply that while the British are not professionals, they are up to the task of defeating the forces of Nazi Germany. It harks back to the age when men fought in armour and when Englishmen were fighting in France.

== Creation and inspiration ==
On the outbreak of World War II, Elstob applied to rejoin the RAF but after a long delay, was turned down. Elstob then volunteered for the Royal Tank Regiment, eventually becoming a tank commander. After serving with the 3rd Battalion in India, Iraq, Syria, Lebanon, Palestine, Egypt and Libya, his battalion went to the UK for re-training and he was assigned as radio operator to Sergeant "Buck" Kite. As part of the 11th Armoured Division he fought in Normandy, Belgium, the Battle of the Bulge and in Germany. These experiences provided him with the material for the novel; at least one incident in the book, from Operation Goodwood during the Battle of Caen, is a word-for-word retelling, according to his obituary.

== Plot summary ==
The novel is divided into two "books", First Light and Last Light, technical terms from RTR training manuals. The author provides the definition of First Light as "When it is possible to distinguish between black and white" and Last Light as "When it is no longer possible to distinguish black from white. The tanks then begin to withdraw". The symbolic meaning is clear.

The novel begins with Sergeant "Paddy" Donovan (likely based on Sergeant "Buck" Kite, a winner of the Military Medal and two bars) training a mostly-new tank crew around Aldershot, in the spring of 1944. Donovan is highly experienced, having fought in the North African Campaign and is invaluable as a leader but shows signs of battle fatigue. He is given a spell of leave with his family, which makes little difference.

His radio operator, Lance Corporal Brook (part based on Elstob), a new man, is looking to move up in the ranks, being more educated than the rest of the crew. The driver, a Welshman named Taffy, another North Africa veteran, is happy to continue in his job. The co-driver, Geordie, is from the working class of Newcastle upon Tyne and is somewhat disruptive, although a good soldier. Brook, Taffy and Geordie remain together through most of the novel.

About a week after D-Day, the unit motors southwards to the Channel ports, to cross the English Channel into the Allied beachhead in Normandy. After landing, the unit hustles inland, where it sits out the June gale for several days, while the new men become familiar with the battlefield. The unit, part of the 11th Armoured Division, is first ordered into the attack as part of Operation Epsom. After crossing the Odon River, the unit tries to advance beyond Hill 112 but is nearly devastated in the process. Donovan comes close to breaking down but he still appears to be fearless to his crew.

Following Epsom, the division is moved to the east end of the bridgehead, to take part in Operation Goodwood, in mid-July. After advancing, the battalion runs into anti-tank fire from the Germans on Bourguébus Ridge. In the early evening Donovan's tank, one of the few still operational, is immobilized while retreating over a railway embankment. Donovan orders the crew to abandon the tank. He is soon wounded in the legs by a German mortar bomb and is internally relieved that he is out of the war, at least temporarily. His wounds are more serious and in the end he loses a leg. While in hospital, he learns that his wife and son have been killed in a V-1 flying bomb attack. Brook, with the reluctant help of Geordie, recovers their tank, which was only stalled by a high-explosive shell hit. This exploit is taken from Elstob's experience during the battle. The following morning, Brook is given command of a tank, with Taffy and Geordie as part of his crew, with two other men, Wilcox as radio operator and Sanderson as gunner. They continue the battle for a few days, then are relieved and moved back to the west.

In August and September the crew participate in the breakout from the Normandy bridgehead and the Great Swan across northern France into Belgium. In December they are redeployed to the Ardennes; their armoured brigade is the only British unit to take part in the Battle of the Bulge, turning back the Germans just short of the Meuse river. At this point the platoon is under command of Lieutenant Kenton, who is clearly battle-fatigued and is preparing to cause a self-inflicted wound, when Brook happens to notice. Brook takes over and defeats the Germans on this line of approach. Brook and Taffy are both awarded the Military Medal and Brook is promoted to Sergeant.

The unit replaces their Sherman tanks with British A-34 Comet tanks. The men are briefed on the upcoming crossing of the Rhine by Field Marshal Montgomery at a cinema. Following the crossing the unit advances into Germany. Brook has begun showing signs of battle fatigue but is keeping it under control as best he can. During the advance, Brook's tank gets bogged trying to cross a stream under orders of his commander. During a German counter-attack, Taffy is seriously wounded and Geordie is mortally wounded.

In the last chapter of the novel, Brook is going into battle again with an almost new crew. When he gets the order to be the vanguard of his regiment's advance, he orders the indiscriminate shelling of a German town, due to his nervous exhaustion and then collapses to the floor of his tank. The radio operator takes over.
