= Thermus (disambiguation) =

Thermus is a genus of bacteria.

Thermus may also be:

- a Roman cognomen, especially as used by
- Quintus Minucius Thermus (consul 193 BC)
- Marcus Minucius Thermus, a Roman praetor (81 BC) and general
- the Latinized spelling of the ancient city Thermos in Aetolia

== See also ==
- Thermos (disambiguation)
