= Peter Elstob =

British writer

- Born: 22 December 1915; London, England
- Died: 21 July 2002 (aged 86); London, England

Peter Frederick Egerton Elstob (22 December 1915 – 21 July 2002) was a British soldier, adventurer, novelist, military historian and entrepreneur.

== Biography ==
Peter Elstob was born in London, UK on 22 December 1915. His father, Frederick, was a chartered accountant whose work drew him and his family first to Calcutta and then to the United States in the immediate aftermath of the war. The family struggled in the US because Frederick's credentials as a CA were not recognised there. Peter attended school in New York and New Jersey, graduating from Summit High School in 1934. Although he remained proudly British, he retained an American accent to the end of his life.

After high school, Elstob began a series of escapades that showed his signature taste for adventure and unconventionality: He ran away from home and signed on as a ship's bellboy. In Rio de Janeiro, he jumped ship, found a job and got engaged to the boss's daughter. His father tracked him down and persuaded him to go to the University of Michigan, but Elstob failed his freshman's year and got into trouble with the police. He was then sent to England with instructions to join the army. A letter of introduction to a friend of his father's led to a short service commission in the RAF.

His stint in the RAF was short; he was dismissed after five months for stunt flying. After several odd jobs, he decided to volunteer as a pilot for the Republicans in Spain. Shortly after his arrival he was arrested and imprisoned on suspicion of spying. He was eventually freed and sent to France due to the intervention of Medora Leigh-Smith, a young Labour Party official he had met in England; his experiences gave him the material for his first novel, The Spanish Prisoner (1939). In France, Leigh-Smith found she was pregnant, and the couple soon married.

On the outbreak of World War II, Elstob applied to rejoin the RAF, but after a long delay he was turned down. He then volunteered with the Royal Tank Regiment, eventually becoming a tank commander.

After serving with the 3rd Battalion in India, Iraq, Syria, Lebanon, Palestine, Egypt and Libya, his battalion went to the UK for re-training, and he was assigned as radio operator to Sergeant "Buck" Kite, a winner of three Military Medals. As part of the 11th Armoured Division he fought in Normandy, Belgium, the Battle of the Bulge, and in Germany. Elstob was convinced that his rejection by the RAF and his inability to rise above the rank of sergeant was due to his efforts in Spain and supposed communist sympathies. His experiences in the Northwest European campaign gave him the material for his best-known novel, Warriors For the Working Day (1960).

During his "odd job" period before the war, Elstob met Arnold "Bushy" Eiloart in Glasgow, and during the war they formed a business partnership, marketing a beauty mask product called Yeast Pac, concocted with the help of Eiloart's wife, Mary. The product proved popular for many years and made both families financially secure. Following the war they partnered on several other ventures. The first was a writers' and artists' colony in Mexico. It was here that Elstob met artist Barbara Morton Zacheisz; in 1953, he and Leigh-Smith were divorced and he married Morton Zacheisz. The next venture was in 1958, an attempted trans-Atlantic balloon flight, with Elstob as manager and Eiloart as captain. While the attempt failed after 1,200 miles, Eiloart and his crew of three were able to make Barbados in their twin-hulled gondola. This adventure led to the non-fiction book The Flight of the Small World (1959).

Elstob was married to Medora Leigh-Smith from 1937 to 1953. They had five children. After their divorce he married Barbara Morton Zacheisz; they had two children.

== Literary career ==
In his writing, he is best known for his lightly-fictionalized novel Warriors For the Working Day (1960) and his military history of the Battle of the Bulge, Hitler's Last Offensive (1971). He joined the Republican Army in the Spanish Civil War, and later served in the Royal Tank Regiment in World War II, in which service he was promoted to sergeant and was Mentioned in Dispatches. He joined International PEN in 1962 and served first as general secretary and later as vice-president for seven years during the 1970s, rescuing the organisation from financial failure; he also secured the future of the Arts Theatre Club in London in 1946. He prospered as an entrepreneur with a facial product called Yeast Pac, with several partners. In his obituary in The Guardian newspaper, Elstob was said to be

...one of those people born in the wrong century. With his charm and audacity, his passion for travel, and his love of risk-taking and financial gambles, he would have been more at home in the reign of Elizabeth I.

During the 1960s Elstob joined the English centre of International PEN, the worldwide association of writers, quickly gaining a place on the executive committee and becoming press officer to the organisation. In 1967, he went to Lagos to seek the release of Wole Soyinka during the Biafran Civil War. During the following years he became more involved in PEN, eventually becoming its secretary-general and then vice-president over a seven-year term, placing the organisation on a firm financial footing. He was unpaid for this work, and neglected his own writing for the sake of the organisation. He was able to retire from his position in 1981, relocating to the New Forest, but he continued to attend International PEN conferences.

In 1971, Elstob's best regarded military history, Hitler's Last Offensive, on the Battle of the Bulge, was published. Elstob was one of the few British soldiers who had fought in that campaign, as part of the 29th Armoured Brigade. During this period he also wrote three popular history paperbacks for the Ballantine's Illustrated History of World War II series: Bastogne: the road block (Battle book, No. 4); Battle of the Reichwald (Battle book, No. 19); and Condor Legion (Weapons book, No. 35). These are probably his best-selling works.

Elstob's writing included two other novels, The Armed Rehearsal (1960), about the Spanish Civil War, and Scoundrel (1986). He claimed that the last was based on a con man he had met on his travels, but his friends and associates believed it was largely autobiographical.

== Published works ==
- The Spanish Prisoner (1939)
- The Flight of the Small World (1959)
- The Armed Rehearsal (1960)
- Warriors For the Working Day (1960)
- Bastogne: the road block (1968)
- Battle of the Reichwald (1970)
- Hitler's Last Offensive (1971)
- Condor Legion (1973)
- Scoundrel (1986)

== In popular culture ==
The protagonist of Gail F. Borden's novel Easter Day 1941 appears to be loosely based on Elstob, and his experiences in the fighting in the Western Desert in early 1941.
