= 1st Battalion, Tower Hamlets Rifles =

1st Battalion, Tower Hamlets Rifles 9th Battalion, Rifle Brigade (Tower Hamlets Rifles)
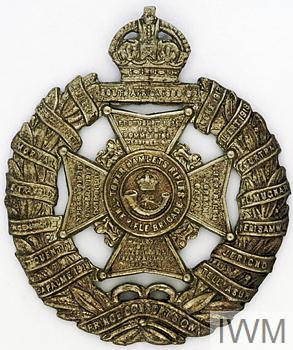
- Cap badge of the Tower Hamlets Rifles, 1926-1947
- Active: 1926–1945
- Country: United Kingdom
- Branch: Territorial Army
- Type: Infantry Battalion
- Role: Motorised Infantry
- Garrison/HQ: 66 Tredegar Road, Bow
- Engagements: Mersa Brega; Tobruk; Operation Crusader; Bir el Gubi; Gazala; Mersa Matruh; First Alamein

The 1st Battalion, Tower Hamlets Rifles, was a Territorial Army (TA) unit of the British Army during World War II. It fought as a motor battalion in the Western Desert campaign, 1941–42, including the Battles of Mersa Brega, Gazala, Mersa Matruh and First Alamein.

== Origin ==
The origin of the Tower Hamlets Rifles lay in an invasion scare of 1859, when large numbers of Rifle Volunteer Corps (RVCs) were formed across Britain. Among these were the 15th Middlesex (The Customs and Docks) and the 2nd Tower Hamlets RVCs, which were raised in London's docklands and East End. Both battalions were affiliated to the Regular Army's Rifle Brigade. When the Territorial Force was formed in 1908, they combined to form the 17th (County of London) Battalion, London Regiment (Poplar and Stepney), with its drill hall at 66 Tredegar Road, Bow. (Note: The Tower Hamlets were the East End villages that constituted the Tower division of the County of Middlesex. The 1908 title indicated the two London metropolitan boroughs (Poplar and Stepney) from which the battalion recruited. Today these are included in the London Borough of Tower Hamlets.)

The part-time Territorials were mobilised on the outbreak of World War I and the 17th Londons served on the Western Front from 1915 until 1918. It formed a 2nd Line battalion (2/17th Londons) that also went to France, but later served at Salonika and in the Sinai and Palestine campaign before returning to the Western Front in the closing stages of the war.

After the war the TF was reorganised as the Territorial Army (TA), and the London Regiment had fallen into abeyance. The unit was reformed in 1920 and changed its title to 17th London Regiment (Tower Hamlets Rifles) in 1926. When the London Regiment was formally abolished it became the Tower Hamlets Rifles, The Rifle Brigade (Prince Consort's Own) in 1937, simply known as the Tower Hamlets Rifles (THR). With the doubling of the TA after the Munich Crisis, the THR formed a 1st and 2nd Battalion in 1939, just before the outbreak of World War II (a 3rd Bn was also formed later).

== World War II ==
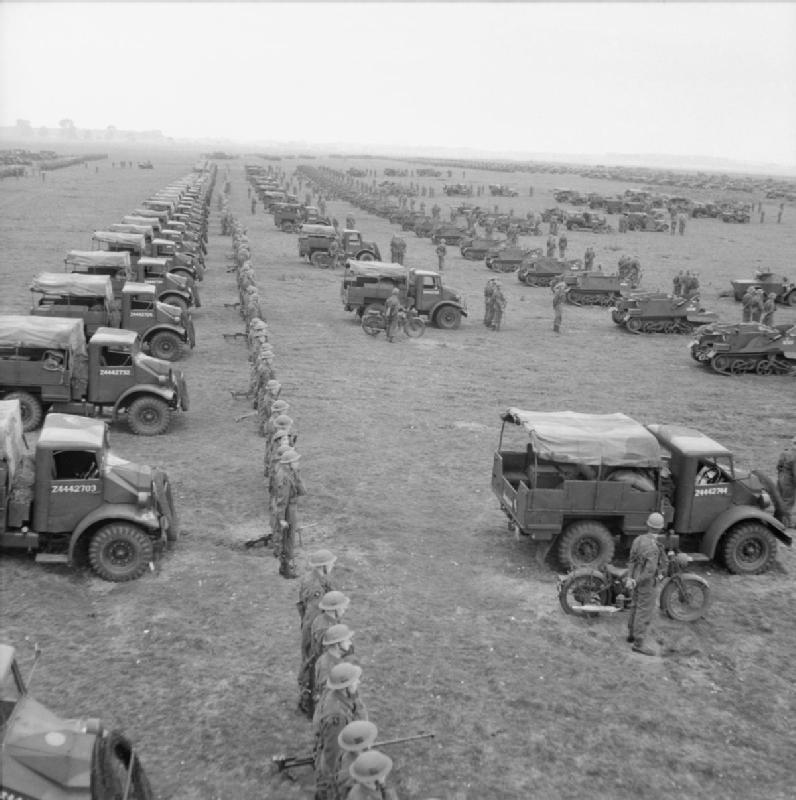
A motor battalion on parade in the UK with Universal carriers and Morris CS8 15-hundredweight trucks.

=== Mobilisation ===
The TA was mobilised on 1 September 1939 and war was declared on 3 September. Both THR battalions mobilised in 3rd London Infantry Brigade, which was temporarily in 1st London Division until the new duplicate 2nd London Division was formed in October.

During World War II the 'Greenjackets' (the King's Royal Rifle Corps (KRRC) and the Rifle Brigade, including their affiliated TA battalions) specialised in providing motorised infantry battalions to armoured brigades and armoured division support groups. The THR battalions were converted into motor battalions in 1940.

=== 1st Tower Hamlets Rifles ===
On 1 March 1940 1st Bn THR was assigned to 2nd Support Group forming in 2nd Armoured Division. (An armoured division's support group at this time was essentially an artillery brigade with some motorised infantry to act as the pivot around which the armoured brigades could manoeuvre.) When the [British Expeditionary Force was evacuated from Dunkirk at the end of May 1940, the 2nd Armoured Division, still incomplete, was in Home Forces' reserve in Lincolnshire. During the summer, when invasion was considered imminent, the division moved down to a position between Northampton and Newmarket, from which IV Corps could send it to counter-attack an invasion force.

After the German defeat in the Battle of Britain the threat of invasion receded and it became possible to send reinforcements to Middle East Forces for operations against the Italian Army. 2nd Armoured Division was the most significant formation sent, arriving at Port Said in Egypt on 31 December 1940, with 1st THR under the command of Lieutenant-Colonel Eric Shipton.

On 15 January 1941 the 1st and 2nd THR were redesignated the 9th and 10th Battalions, Rifle Brigade (Tower Hamlets Rifles) (9th and 10th RB). (Note: Not to be confused with the 9th and 10th (Service) Bns, Rifle Brigade, formed in 'Kitchener's Army' in World War I.)

=== 9th Rifle Brigade (Tower Hamlets Rifles) ===
During February, elements of 2nd Armoured Division were sent up piecemeal to Cyrenaica to relieve 7th Armoured Division, which had been in contact with the Italians for eight months without rest. After desert training 3rd Armoured Brigade moved up on 26 February as an independent brigade group with 9th RB attached. The battalion's first task was peacekeeping between the local Arabs and the Italian settlers. Then on 22 March it took over the front at Mersa Brega, some 150 miles (240 km) south of Benghazi.

==== Mersa Brega ====
9th Rifle Brigade's first motorised patrol identified Germans opposite, the first sign that the Italians had been reinforced by the Afrika Korps under Gen Erwin Rommel. The German counter-offensive (Operation Sonnenblume) began on 31 March, when 9th RB's carrier platoon, operating in front of C Company, was attacked at 08.00 by armoured cars, tanks, and motor-cycle combinations. The carriers were ordered to withdraw to Cemetery Hill, held by A Company. This was held until about 10.15, when all but one platoon and the carriers were withdrawn. The latter stayed for a further half hour, being attacked by Dive bombers. German tanks now attacked the battalion's main position, held by A and B Companies (D Company was digging a fallback position at Agedabia). The tanks were engaged by the field artillery and riflemen with Boys anti-tank rifles, and withdrew after one or two had been knocked out, but German infantry and artillery now overlooked Cemetery Hill. After a lull the dive bombers returned, and at 16.30 a series of attacks developed against the battalion's flank. For some time the attacks were held, but the tanks began penetrating the main position and the companies were withdrawn in succession, A Company suffering heavily. The battalion fell back 25 miles (40 km) in the darkness to an intermediate position. Although the Luftwaffe attacked the battalion next day, the German ground forces did not appear. However, the Afrika Korps offensive was developing rapidly, and 2nd Support Group was ordered to hold it up as long as possible. A bigger attack came in on 2 April and 9th RB had trouble disengaging – most of B Company was cut off by tanks and captured, as was the carrier platoon covering the withdrawal. The enemy tanks then began attacking the Adegabia position, forcing the battalion, now reduced to half its strength, to withdraw along the main coast road, littered with broken-down British tanks that had to be set on fire. The battalion passed through Derna on 6 April but the enemy tanks driving over the desert had also got there, attacking the flank of the column. These were driven off by field and anti-aircraft guns and a few tanks, but battalion HQ and C Company suffered severely. The remainder of the battalion reached Tobruk on 7 April.

==== Siege of Tobruk ====
That part of the battalion for which transport could be found joined a mobile column under Brigadier Jock Campbell, which remained outside the town. The dismounted portion of the battalion with 3rd Armoured Bde Group formed part of the garrison for the first month of the Siege of Tobruk, and were then evacuated by sea to the Nile Delta to refit. Campbell's mobile column (one of the so-called 'Jock Columns') withdrew slowly through Gambut and Buq Buq, then from 22 April patrolled the escarpment at Sofafi. Here the British had re-established a front at the Egyptian frontier, while the Axis forces attempted to capture Tobruk. At the beginning of May the elements of 9th RB with the column were also sent back to the Delta to refit.

==== Operation Crusader ====
2nd Armoured Division's HQ had been captured during the retreat, and 2nd Support Group was broken up in the Delta, 9th RB officially leaving on 15 May. The reassembled battalion, now under the command of Lt-Col 'Squeak' Purdon, received a number of replacement officers from the Regular 2nd Battalion. On 15 September, as Eighth Army prepared for a renewed offensive in the winter to break through to Tobruk (Operation Crusader), 9th RB was assigned to 22nd Guards Bde, which was to be held in reserve for a dash across the desert. In the meantime the battalion guarded advanced supply dumps established west of the frontier wire and south of the intended battle.

Operation Crusader was launched on 18 November. 22nd Guards Bde cut the wire for the advance of 7th Armoured Division, and then settled down to defend a field maintenance centre at Bir Gibni. As the battle seemed to be going well, 9th RB was ordered to leave a company at Bir Gibni and then move with a field artillery battery to engage the enemy on the edge of the main battle. The battalion was in action against scattered enemy forces on 22 November when news came that Rommel had broken through and was moving rapidly towards the frontier and Eighth Army's rear areas. 9th Rifle Brigade was sent racing back parallel to the German columns, and C Company attacked one, driving it northwards to be dealt with by the Desert Air Force. Once the crisis was over, 9th RB rejoined 22nd Guards Bde which was sent to assist 11th Indian Bde attacking the Italian Ariete Division at Bir el Gubi. A mixed German column arrived to aid the Italians, and 9th RB came in for shelling and Stuka raids, but although there were no effective anti-tank weapons the German armour held off and the Indian troops were able to withdraw through 9th RB. The Axis forces withdrew at last light.

By early December Eighth Army had regained the initiative, Tobruk had been relieved, and the Axis forces were being pushed back. 9th Rifle Brigade was attached to 4th Armoured Bde for a wide turning movement on a dark night, but it failed to cut off any significant enemy units. The battalion returned to 22nd Guards Bde, which was sent up to the coast road at Agedabia, watching the German rearguards withdrawing. One company was counter-attacked by German tanks and had to pull back hurriedly. The battalion continued a confusing series of command changes, often with companies detached. On 28 December it came under 22nd Armoured Bde near Haseiat. The brigade was ordered to dislodge the Germans from a series of sandy ridges, and attacked with 3rd and 4th County of London Yeomanry, with B and C Companies attached respectively, while Battalion HQ and A Company remained under Brigade HQ. The enemy light forces were driven in on the evening of 28 December and next day the brigade advanced until it contacted a strong enemy force. While the armoured regiments and motor companies were thus engaged, another enemy column appeared from the north and attacked Battalion HQ and A Company with the brigade's 'soft' vehicles. A Company suffered heavily, losing almost all the company HQ as prisoners, but D Company arrived back from detachment to stabilise the position. As the enemy continued their retirement to Aghelia, 9th Rifle Brigade formed part of three mobile columns patrolling the desert until 19 January when it was relieved and went back 100 miles (160 km) for rest and training as part of 2nd Armoured Bde Group.

However, on 21 January the Axis forces broke through again and 9th RB found its rest camp back in the front line. The regiments in the camp were formed into three mobile columns, with a company of 9th RB attached to each; 'Squeakcol' was commanded by Lt-Col 'Squeak' Purdon. After confused fighting north of Msus (both sides were moving at speed in the same direction, and both were using numerous captured vehicles), the columns were ordered to withdraw to the east. Squeakcol with a battery of 2nd Royal Horse Artillery cut its way through a German column, then found itself out of wireless contact with any HQ, and with fuel running low. Sharing out fuel, the battalion and battery moved north for half the night, then pushed on a first light until it contacted a British patrol and was directed to a concentration of troops in the Charruba area, including the column containing B Company. Next day a further withdrawal was ordered, in the course of which C Company rejoined, the company commander having taken over his column after its commander was captured, and having fired the 2nd RHA gun himself.

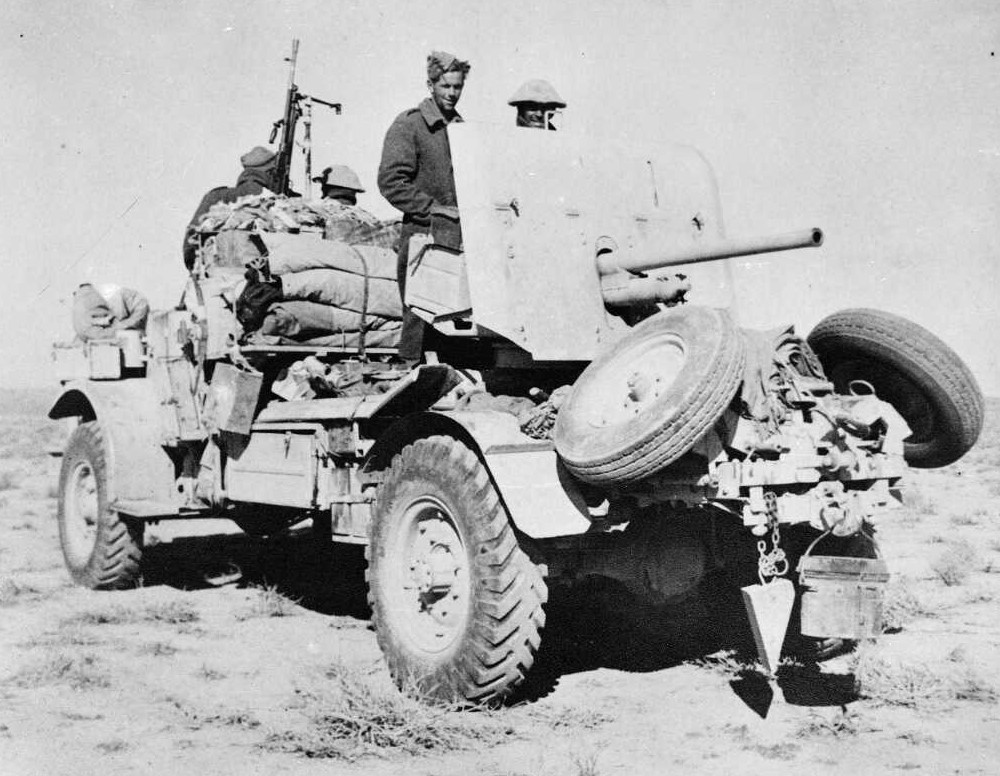
2-Pounder anti-tank gun carried 'portee'.

==== Gazala ====
By now Eighth Army was in its prepared Gazala Line defences, and units could reorganise. 9th Rifle Brigade re-formed its A Company, guarded supply dumps and gaps in the minefields, and sent out occasional patrols. The motor battalions were now given a company of 16 2-pounder anti-tank guns carried 'portee' on trucks, and a platoon of Vickers machine guns to each company; later these weapons were concentrated in Support Company. In April 9th RB went back to Buq Buq for rest.

By May, both sides were ready to resume the fighting. 9th Rifle Brigade was guarding a field maintenance area behind the centre of the Gazala Line, then was sent down to reinforce the Free French garrison of Bir Hacheim, where it was bombed on arrival. Next day (26 May) the Axis launched their offensive (the Battle of Gazala), and 9th RB was attacked by a strong force of tanks and infantry advancing through a sandstorm. The battalion's machine guns and 2-pdrs firing 'portee' got off a few unobserved rounds into the storm until it was ordered to move north to Bir el Gubi. Here it was drawn into the northern fighting around the 'Knightsbridge Box' (the Battle of the Cauldron). The battalion occupied a 'box' at Elvet el Tamar on 8 June. When Bir Hacheim was evacuated on 11 June C Company was detached to form part of a column to hold off the enemy advancing from the south. The company was in contact with the enemy over the next two days as German tank superiority overwhelmed the British forces. It was then withdrawn to Acroma and took part in the unsuccessful attempts to keep open the road from Tobruk to Gazala. After a spell under the command of 1st KRRC, C Company rejoined 9th RB near Mersa Matruh on 26 June. Meanwhile the rest of the battalion had defended Elvet el Tamar but were withdrawn before it was overrun. 9th Rifle Brigade moved into Tobruk as a mobile reserve in the centre of the defences, but was ordered out to the east before the Axis capture of Tobruk on 21 June. The battalion then operated in columns in the Sidi Rezegh area before falling back to Matruh. During the retreat 9th RB took part in several rearguard actions, despite its worn-out carriers and 15-cwt trucks (on one occasion when retreating from a tank attack, it was outrun by local Bedouin on camels and donkeys). On one occasion A Company captured an Italian light tank and used it to knock out several vehicles of the enemy advanced guard.

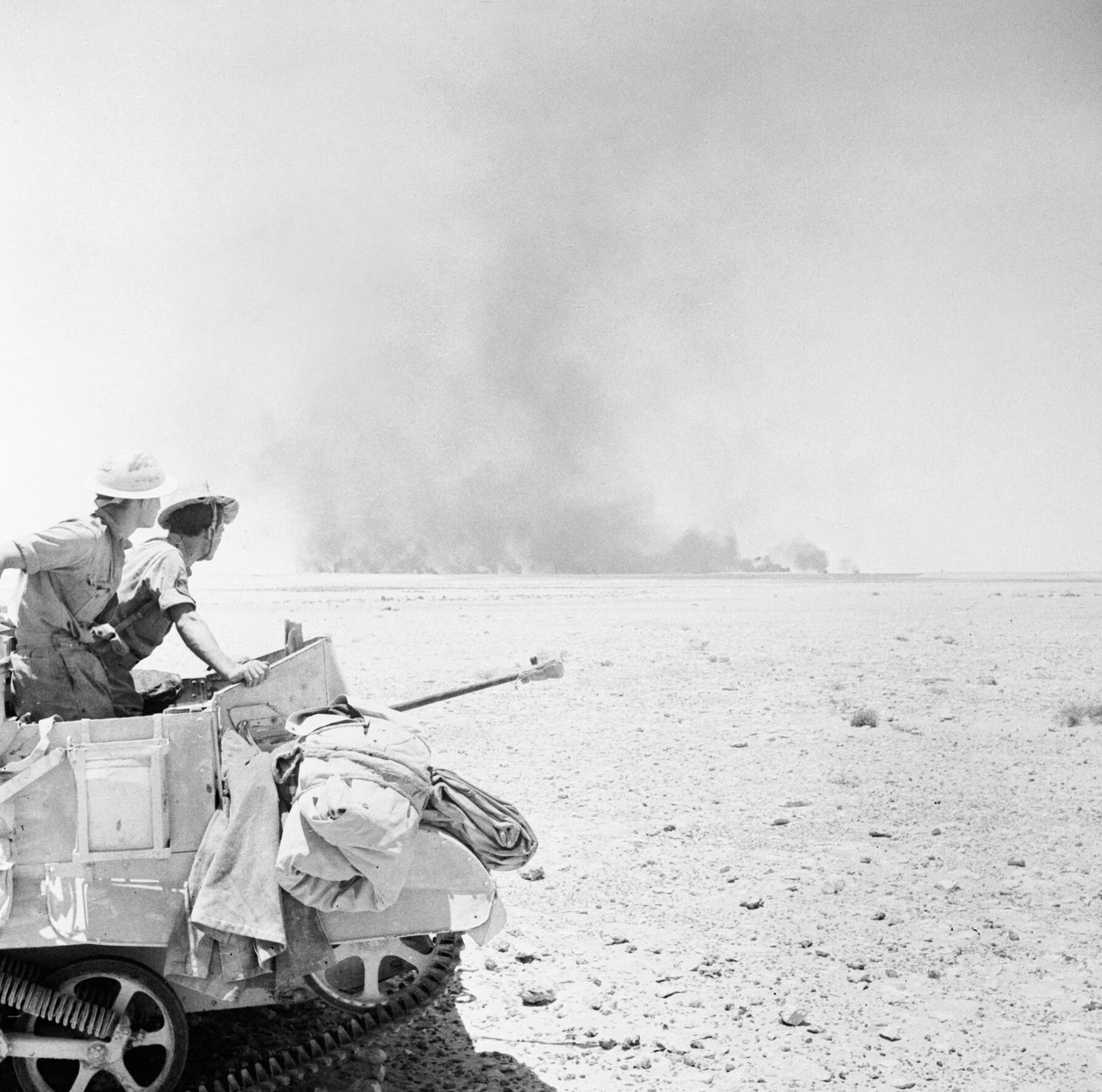
Men of 9th Rifle Brigade in their carrier watch the destruction of a supply dump at Hamra during the retreat to El Alamein.

After the Battle of Mersa Matruh in late June Eighth Army withdrew to El Alamein. C Company was ordered to defend the main road a few miles west of Dabaa to cover the evacuation of that town. Nearing the road in the dark the riflemen could hear heavy enemy traffic on the road, indicating that Dabaa had already fallen. Nevertheless the company commander decided to try to block the road temporarily, and deployed his company behind a small hump about 800 yards (730 m). The portee anti-tank and machine guns were positioned to cover the road, with the motor platoons covering their flanks. As dawn broke the carrier platoon moved forward to another small hill overlooking the road and on a given signal 'everyone opened up on the numerous targets that presented themselves'. The Axis troops were taken by surprise and it was two and a half hours before they were able to assemble a force large enough to dislodge C Company. In that time the company destroyed around 16 vehicles and took 25 prisoners, but more importantly it cut the only Axis supply route for that time. By 2 July Eighth Army was back in the strong defensive position at El Alamein, where both sides dug in.

==== First Alamein ====
Eighth Army counter-attacked on 15 July (the First Battle of Ruweisat Ridge) with a temporary group of columns under Brig R.B. Waller known as 'Wall Group' in support; 9th RB was assigned to this group. The battalion was then assigned to 4th Armoured Bde on 18 July and over the following weeks it was in constant motion, being used to plug gaps in the line during the First Battle of El Alamein. On 3 August 9th RB left 4th Armoured Bde and went back to Egypt to refit.

==== Disbandment ====
By early August 9th RB was refitting in the Delta area when a decision was made to break it up to provide reinforcements for the other RB battalions in the theatre. It was reduced to a cadre, which returned to the UK, and on 22 December 1942 the battalion was deemed to have passed into 'suspended animation'.

==== Wanderings ====
The regimental history of the Rifle Brigade in World War II comments that 'the Battalion never remained under the same command for long at a stretch: at twenty-for hours' notice or less they would be switched to another brigade or division', and it lists the bewildering changes the battalion endured after the break-up of 2nd Support Gp:

- 15 September–13 December 1941: 22nd Guards Bde
- 14–21 December: 4th Armoured Bde
- 22–31 December: 22nd Armoured Bde
- 1–19 January 1942: 7th Support Gp
- 20–21 January: 2nd Armoured Bde
- 21–27 January: Vaughan-Hughes Force
- 28 January–12 February: 1st Support Gp
- 13 February–21 May: 200th Guards Bde
- 22–29 May: XXX Corps
- 29 May (am): 7th Motor Bde
- 29 May (pm): 29th Indian Bde
- 30 May–1 June: XXX Corps
- 1–3 June: Gray Force
- 3–4 June: 201st Guards Motor Bde
- 4–5 June: 2nd Armoured Bde
- 5–6 June: 4th Armoured Bde
- 6–8 June: 1st Armoured Division
- 8–12 June: 22nd Armoured Bde
- 13–15 June: 2nd South African Division
- 16–17 June: XXX Corps
- 17–22 June: 7th Motor Bde
- 22–26 June: 3rd Indian Motor Bde
- 26 June (am): 7th Armoured Division
- 26 June–4 July: 1st Armoured Division
- 5–18 July: Wall Group
- 19 July –3 August: 4th Armoured Bde
- 4–8 August: Eighth Army

=== Reformed ===
9th Rifle Brigade was reformed on 20 February 1944 by amalgamating the cadre at Retford with 2nd Motor Training Bn, Rifle Brigade. This was converted into 86 Primary Training Wing on 20 March 1944 and passed into suspended animation once more when the personnel were transferred to 27th Greenjackets Holding Bn on 29 November 1945.

== Postwar ==
When the TA was reconstituted on 1 January 1947, 9th RB (THR) absorbed 10th RB (THR) and was reformed in an anti-aircraft role as 656th Light Anti-Aircraft Regiment, Royal Artillery (Tower Hamlets). It went through a series of subsequent mergers until the Tower Hamlets lineage ended in 1971.
