= Frederick Hotblack =

British Army general

Major-General Frederick Hotblack DSO & Bar MC & Bar
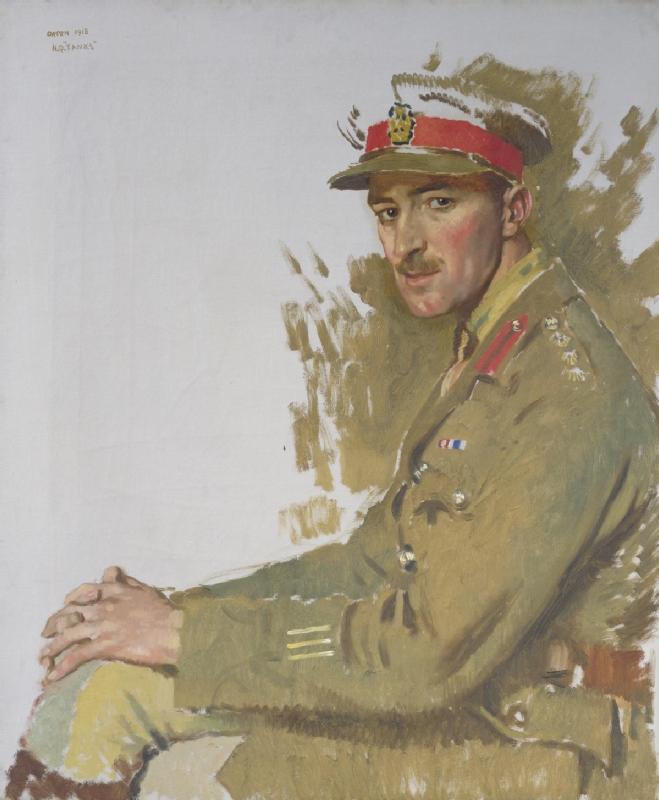
- Portrait as a major by Sir William Orpen, 1917
- Born: 12 March 1887; Norwich, Norfolk, England
- Died: 8 January 1979 (aged 91)
- Military career
- Allegiance: United Kingdom
- Branch: British Army
- Service years: 1914–1941
- Rank: Major-General
- Nickname: "Boots"
- Service number: 15316
- Units: Norfolk Regiment; Intelligence Corps
- Commands: 2nd Armoured Division (1939–40)
- Conflicts: First World War; Second World War
- Awards: Distinguished Service Order & Bar; Military Cross & Bar; Mentioned in Despatches; Order of Saint Anna, 4th Class (Russia); Knight of the Legion of Honour (France)

Major-General Frederick Elliot Hotblack, DSO & Bar, MC & Bar (12 March 1887 – 9 January 1979) was a senior British Army officer who fought in the First World War as an early member of the Tank Corps (later the Royal Tank Regiment) and commanded the 2nd Armoured Division in the early part of the Second World War.

== Life ==
Major-General Hotblack's medals on display at The Tank Museum

Frederick was the son of John Hotblack, a Norwich businessman in the boot and shoe manufacture. He had trained as an accountant and studied at University of Geneva. He spent two years in the Rhineland and was fluent in French and German Despite lack of experience in the military he was made a temporary lieutenant and served on the staff of Field Marshal Sir John French then that of Douglas Haig.

Hotblack received a regular commission with the Norfolk Regiment in 1915 and served in the First World War as an intelligence officer in France before transferring to the then "Heavy Branch" of the Machine Gun Corps (later the Royal Tank Corps) in 1916. On 14 November, while a temporary captain, he guided a tank of A Company to its objective by walking ahead of it despite enemy fire. For this action he was awarded the DSO to add to his Military Cross. On the 23rd, he took control of infantry who had lost their officers and with tanks organised an attack – earning a Bar to his Distinguished Service Order. The citation for his Bar, appearing in The London Gazette in July 1918, reads as follows:

For conspicuous gallantry and devotion to duty during an attack. He reorganised the infantry whose officers had become casualties, collected tanks, and succeeded in launching a fresh attack under heavy fire. He set a splendid example of courage and initiative on this and many other occasions.

Hotblack took staff officer positions for the remainder of the war. He was awarded the Military Cross for "conspicuous gallantry, initiative and devotion to duty" in September 1918. While assessing the front, he found a German position blocking the advance and organised two tanks into action against it, riding in one of them himself. Despite being injured during the attack, after the tanks were knocked out he got the wounded to safety and arranged infantry for a defence against a counterattack.

After the war Hotblack attended the Staff College, Camberley, from 1920 to 1921, and served in the War Office before becoming brigade major of 1st Rhine Brigade in 1921. He was appointed an instructor at the Staff College in 1932, military attaché at the British Embassy in Berlin in 1935 and deputy director of Staff Duties at the War Office in 1937. He served in Second World War on the General Staff of the British Expeditionary Force before becoming General Officer Commanding 2nd Armoured Division in 1939 and then, following an accident in April 1940, being invalided out of the army in 1941.

== Bibliography ==
- Smart, Nick (2005). Biographical Dictionary of British Generals of the Second World War. Barnesley: Pen & Sword. ISBN 1844150496.

== Bibliography ==
- Biography Tank Museum, Bovington
- Generals of World War II

Military offices
| New command | GOC 2nd Armoured Division; 1939–1940 | Succeeded by Justice Tilly |
