= Reginald Keller =

English cricketer and British Army officer

Reginald Charles Keller
- Born: 5 August 1894; Fareham, Hampshire, England
- Died: 30 October 1986 (aged 92); Ballylickey, Munster, Ireland
- Military career
- Allegiance: United Kingdom
- Branch: British Army
- Service years: 1914–1948
- Rank: Brigadier
- Service number: 15767
- Units: Hampshire Regiment; Machine Gun Corps; Tanks Corps
- Commands: 3rd Royal Tank Regiment
- Conflicts: First World War; Second World War

Reginald Keller
Cricket information
- Batting: Unknown
- Bowling: Unknown

Domestic team information
- Years: Team
- 1928/29–1929/30: Europeans (India)
- 1926–1928: Dorset

Career statistics
| Competition | First-class |
|---|---|
| Matches | 3 |
| Runs scored | 47 |
| Batting average | 11.75 |
| 100s/50s | –/– |
| Top score | 25 |
| Balls bowled | 348 |
| Wickets | 9 |
| Bowling average | 19.11 |
| 5 wickets in innings | 1 |
| 10 wickets in match | – |
| Best bowling | 5/50 |
| Catches/stumpings | 1/– |
- Source: Cricinfo, 5 October 2018

Brigadier Reginald Charles Keller (5 August 1894 – 30 October 1986) was an English first-class cricketer and British Army officer.

== Early life and First World War ==
The son of Charles Keller, he was born at Fareham, Hampshire. Keller was educated at Radley College, entering in 1909. He served in the British Army during World War I, enlisting in September 1914 as a second lieutenant in the Hampshire Regiment. In April 1917, he was promoted to the rank of lieutenant. He served the latter part of the war in the Machine Gun Corps, and remained in the corps after its conclusion.

== Cricket, WWII and later life ==
He joined the Tanks Corps (later the Royal Tank Regiment) in April 1921, by this point holding the rank of captain. He married Maureen Standish Harrison in March 1922, with the couple having a daughter in 1926. He made his debut in minor counties cricket for Dorset in 1926, with Keller playing in the Minor Counties Championship six times from 1926–1928. Having fulfilled the role of Assistant Instructor at the Tank Gun School, Keller relinquished this position in January 1929.

While serving in British India, Keller made his debut in first-class cricket for the Europeans against the Muslims at Lahore in March 1929. He played two further first-class matches in 1930, playing for the Europeans against the Muslim, and for a Punjab Governor's XI against the Muslims. In the 1930 Europeans v Muslims match, Keller took his career best bowling figures, taking 5/50 from 21 overs. He became a major in April 1935.

Weeks into World War II, Keller was promoted to lieutenant colonel in October 1939. In May 1940 he commanded 3rd Royal Tank Regiment during the defence of Calais in support of the Dunkirk evacuation, and later commanded tanks in North Africa.

He retired from active service in March 1948, after a military career spanning almost thirty-four years, at which time he was granted the honorary rank of brigadier. He later moved to Ireland, where he lived out his final years at Ballylickey in County Cork, passing away there in October 1986, at the age of 92.
