= Thermos bomb =

AR-4
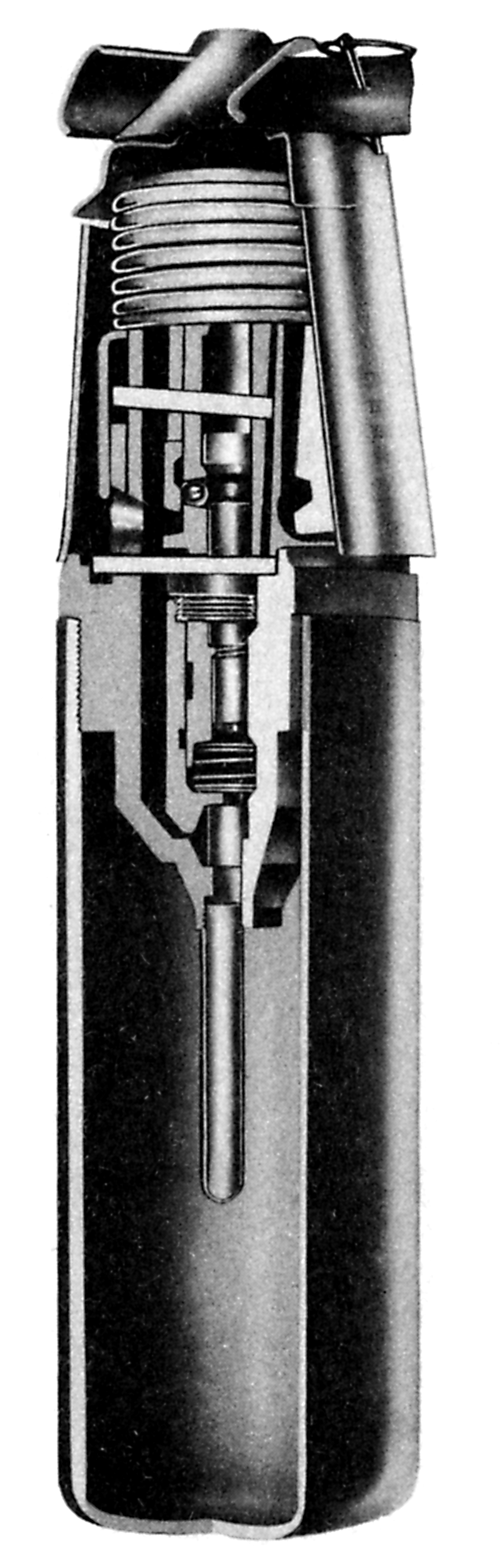
- A cross section of the bomb
- Type: Aerial bomb
- Place of origin: Italy

Service history
- Used by: Italy
- Wars: World War II

Specifications
- Mass: 3.68 kg
- Length: 12.3 inches
- Diameter: 2.75 inches
- Filling: TNT
- Filling weight: 0.67 kg
- Detonation mechanism: Anti-handling device

Thermos bomb was the informal name for the AR-4, an air dropped anti-personnel mine used by the Italian Air Force during World War II. Large numbers were used against Malta and in the Middle East. It was named for its superficial appearance to a Thermos bottle, a popular brand of vacuum flask. The bomb was a cylinder 31 centimetres (12 in) long and weighing 3.68 kilograms (8.1 lb). It could be fitted with a very sensitive motion-sensitive fuze that would detonate if any attempt was made to move it. It could be lethal in the open to approximately 35 metres (115 ft). Because of this, unexploded Thermos bombs were normally destroyed where they fell, either by attaching a long piece of string to them and giving it a jerk, or detonating a small explosive charge near them.

A later variant of the fuze introduced a long time delay, which triggered between 60 and 80 hours after the fuze had armed.
