= 3rd Royal Tank Regiment =

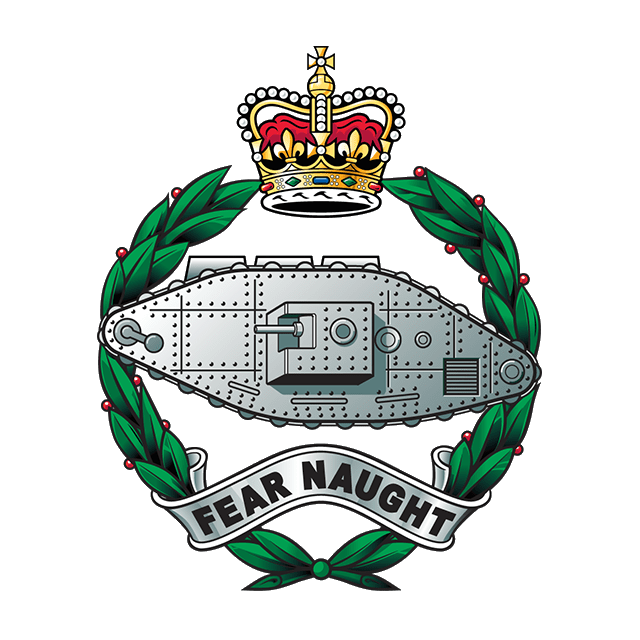
- Insignia of the Royal Tank Regiment
- Active: May 1916 – September 1992
- Country: United Kingdom
- Branch: British Army
- Type: Armoured
- Role: Div Troops/Land Warfare training
- Size: One regiment
- Part of: Royal Armoured Corps
- Nickname: The Armoured Farmers
- Motto: Fear Naught
- March: Quick: "On the Quarterdeck" (3RTR) and "My Boy Willie" (all RTR regiments); Slow: "The Royal Tank Regiment Slow March"
- Battle honours: see Battle Honours

Commanders
- Colonel-in-Chief: HM The King

Insignia
- Tactical Recognition Flash

The 3rd Royal Tank Regiment (3 RTR) was an armoured regiment of the British Army in existence from 1917 until 1992. It was part of the Royal Tank Regiment, itself part of the Royal Armoured Corps. It originally saw action as C Battalion, Tank Corps in 1917.

== History ==
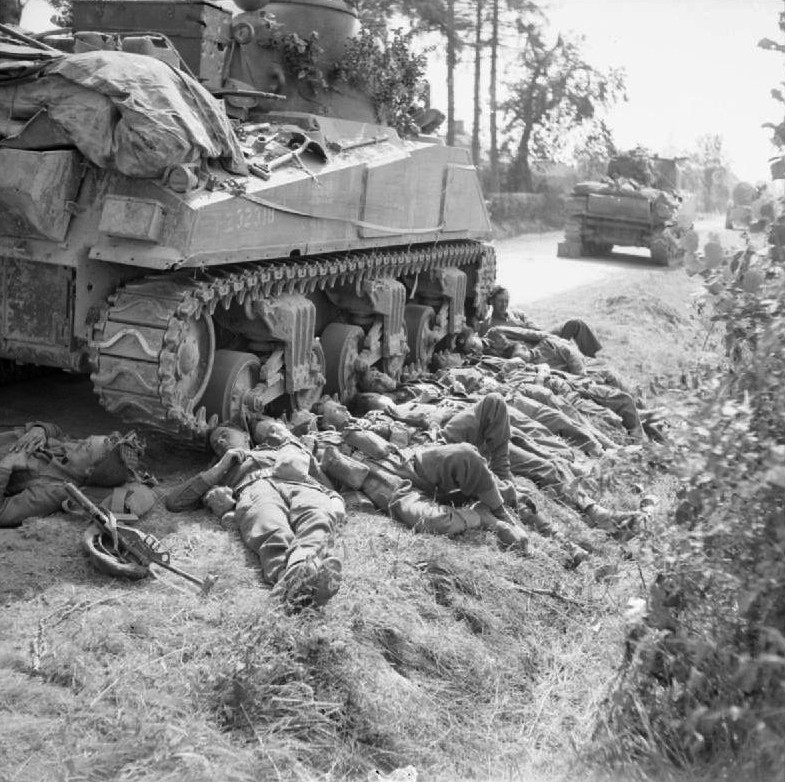
A Sherman tank of 3rd Royal Tank Regiment during the Normandy campaign, August 1944

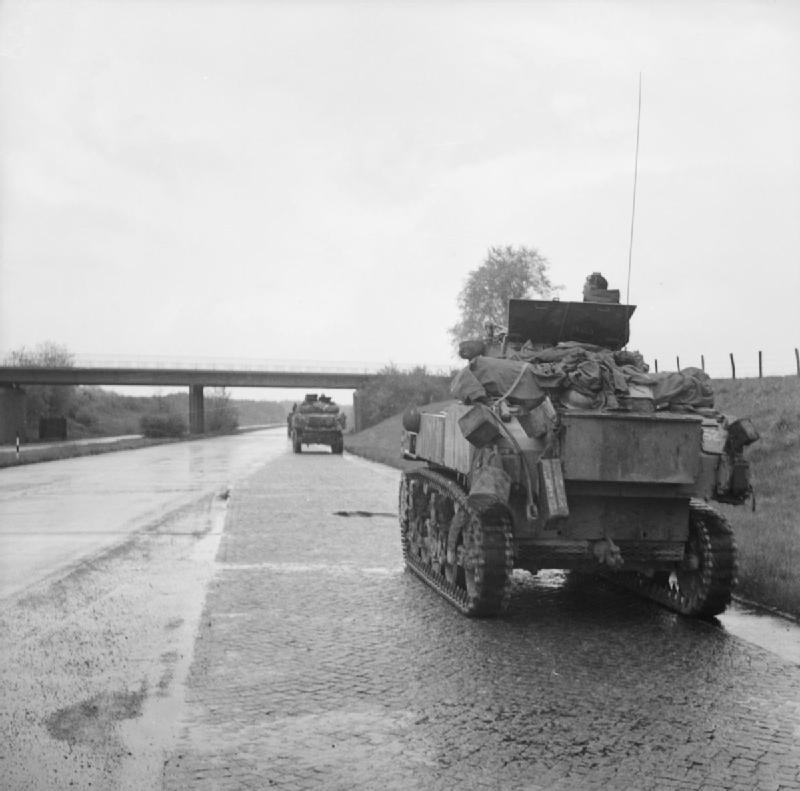
Stuart tanks of 3rd Royal Tank Regiment, 11th Armoured Division, drive along an autobahn towards Lubeck, 2 May 1945

In 1916 the Machine Gun Corps formed a Heavy Section, later Branch, in order to crew the first tanks. C Company was formed at Bisley and sent to France, after offensives in 1916 the Heavy Section became the Heavy Branch and "C" Company was expanded to Battalion strength. The Heavy Branch was then reformed in to a new Tank Corps and "C" Battalion then fought from Cambrai to the end of the war, being re-equipped with Whippet tanks in 1918. Lieutenant Cecil Sewell won the Battalion's only Victoria Cross for an outstanding act of bravery at Frémicourt in August of that year.

Post war, the Tank Corps was trimmed down and received the Royal prefix with the lettered battalions being numbered and "C" became 3rd Tank Corps. In 1939 the 3 RTR was retitled from "3rd Royal Tank Regiment".

With the outbreak of the Second World War the army was once more deployed to France. In 1940, 3 RTR, commanded by Lieutenant Colonel Reginald Keller, was preparing for deployment as part of 1st Armoured Division when it was diverted at short notice to Calais. Here it fought during the four-day Siege of Calais, part of the Battle of France. All of its tanks were lost, and many personnel were killed or taken prisoner, but some escaped to Dunkirk or were evacuated from Calais before the port fell.

The regiment was subsequently rebuilt in the United Kingdom as part of 3rd Armoured Brigade, its original parent formation. Shipped to the Middle East, it was part of the 1st Armoured Brigade when it was sent to defend Greece to try to stem the German invasion in March 1941. From May to mid November 1941, there was a period of reorganisation in Egypt. In 1942, it briefly amalgamated with the 5th Royal Tank Regiment, as the 3rd/5th Royal Tank Regiment, returning to its previous title a month later. It was then attached to 8th Armoured Brigade. 3 RTR was transferred back to the UK in late 1943 joining 29th Armoured Brigade of the 11th Armoured Division.

After the war in 1959, it amalgamated with the 6th Royal Tank Regiment without change of title. In 1973 and again in 1974 the regiment was deployed to Northern Ireland during the Troubles. In 1992, 3 RTR amalgamated with the 2nd Royal Tank Regiment under that name.

== Commanding officers ==
The commanding officers have been:

- 1943-1944: Lt.-Col. David A. Silvertop (died Sint Anthonis, Netherlands)
- 1957–1959: Lt.-Col. Richard Ward
- 1959–1960: Lt.-Col. Peter A.L. Vaux
- 1960–1962: Lt.-Col. Allan Taylor
- 1962–1964: Lt.-Col. John C. Barras
- 1964–1966: Lt.-Col. David T. Grantham
- 1966–1969: Lt.-Col. Michael A. Sanders
- 1969–1971: Lt.-Col. Richard M. Jerram
- 1971–1973: Lt.-Col. John G.R. Dixon
- 1973–1976: Lt.-Col. Gregory Read
- 1976–1978: Lt.-Col. R. Christopher J. Dick
- 1978–1981: Lt.-Col. William A. Allen
- 1981–1983: Lt.-Col. Richard S. Evans
- 1983–1986: Lt.-Col. John Woodward
- 1986–1988: Lt.-Col. Michael J. Napper
- 1988–1991: Lt.-Col. Rodney W. Brummitt
- 1991–1992: Lt.-Col. Andrew Ridgway

== See also ==
- Bob Crisp
- Peter Elstob
- Fred Kite
