= 5th Royal Tank Regiment =

- Active: 1917– 1969
- Country: United Kingdom
- Branch: British Army
- Size: Regiment
- Part of: Royal Armoured Corps
- Engagements: First World War; Second World War

5th Royal Tank Regiment (5 RTR) was an armoured regiment of the British Army in existence for 52 years, from 1917 until 1969. It was part of the Royal Tank Regiment, itself part of the Royal Armoured Corps. It originally saw action as E Battalion, Tank Corps in 1917.

At the Battle of Cambrai in late 1917, during the First World War, the squadron of tanks led by Arthur George Griffiths made a huge impact on the battle. The commanding general asked for the squadron of tanks to be doubled in size, and so Griffiths's squadron evolved into the 5th Tank Regiment.

The regiment saw wide-ranging service in the Second World War, and fought in nearly all of the major allied campaigns from the 1940 retreat from France through the Western Desert Campaign, Normandy and on into Germany. It became part of the 22nd Armoured Brigade, of the 7th Armoured Division.

In December 1946, the regiment was the first to use Centurion tanks in regular service.

In 1960, under the command of Hugo Ironside, it amalgamated with 8th Royal Tank Regiment without change of title. It was disbanded in 1969.

The 5th Royal Tank Regiment Reunion Association holds annual reunions.

In 2007, an image of a 1944 tank commander in the 5th Royal Tank Regiment uniform was used on one of a series of Royal mail stamps featuring British Army uniforms.

== Commanding officers ==
The commanding officers included:

- 1959–1960: Lt.-Col. Allan Taylor
- 1960–1961: Lt.-Col. Hugo Ironside
- 1961–1963: Lt.-Col. Edward Anstey
- 1963–1966: Lt.-Col. Peter E. Dey
- 1966–1968: Lt.-Col. Roy L.C. Dixon
- 1968–1969: Lt.-Col. Richard Lawson
