= Senussi Cave Railway =

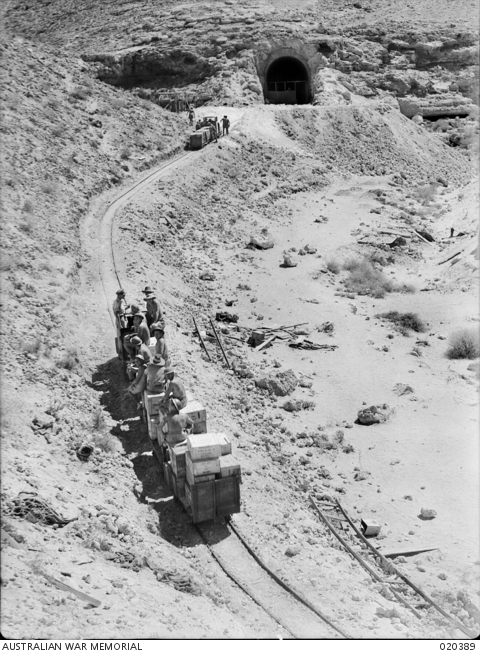
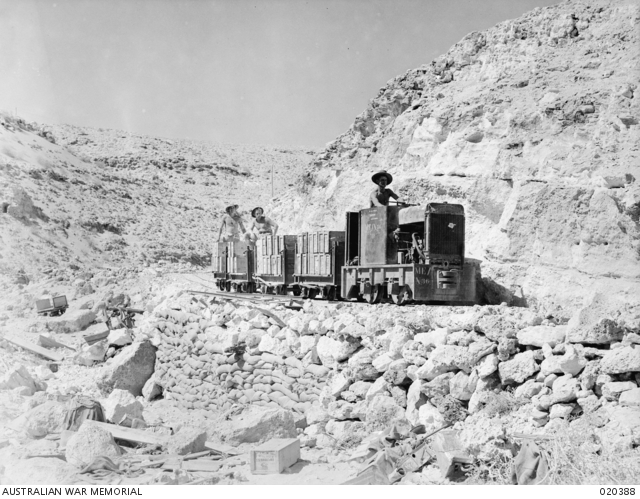
- Train in front of the Senussi Cave Narrow gauge train above a wadi at the eastern side of Tobruk harbour

Technical
- Line length: 400 yd (370 m)
- Track gauge: 2 ft (610 mm)

The Senussi Cave Railway was a 400 yards (370 m) long, 2 feet (610 mm) narrow gauge railway that was built in 1941 during the Siege of Tobruk at the Senussi Cave near Tobruk, Libya.

== History ==
The Senussi Cave Railway leads from a military road that was blasted into the mountains on 28 August 1941 above a wadi east of Tobruk harbour to the Senussi Cave.

The Senussi Cave had been reinforced during World War II by Italian troops with a concrete arch. It was captured by British and Australian troops in the summer of 1941 and prepared to be used as a field hospital named "Senussi Hospital" in the cave. However, eventually it was used as a bomb-proof store. Up to 300 t of ammunition and goods could be securely stored there.

== Photos ==
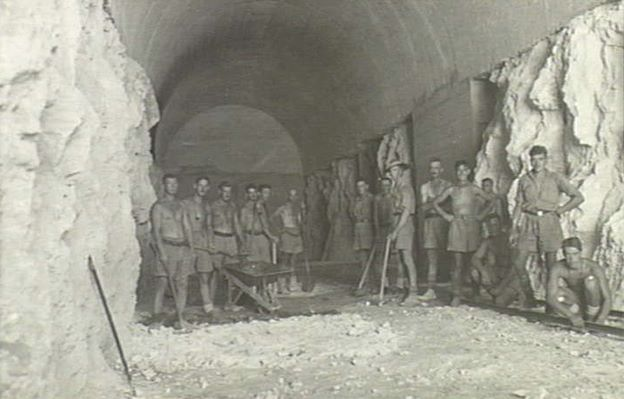
"Senussi Hospital" cave

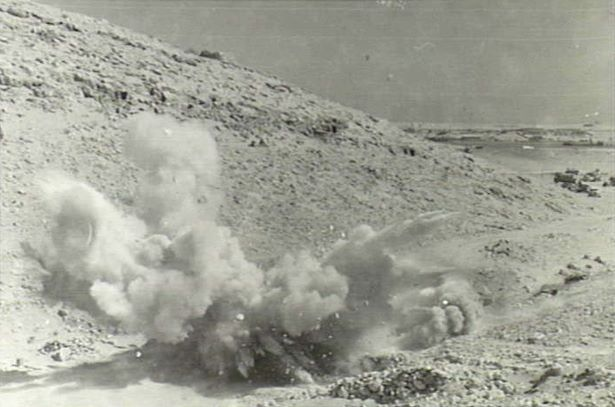
Blasting of the military road

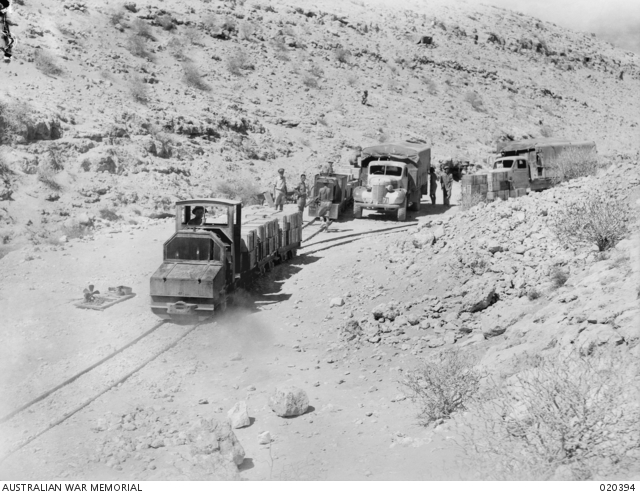
Loading the trains east of the harbour

== Rolling stock ==
- 2 diesel locos
- 6 wagons
